= History of rail transport in Malawi =

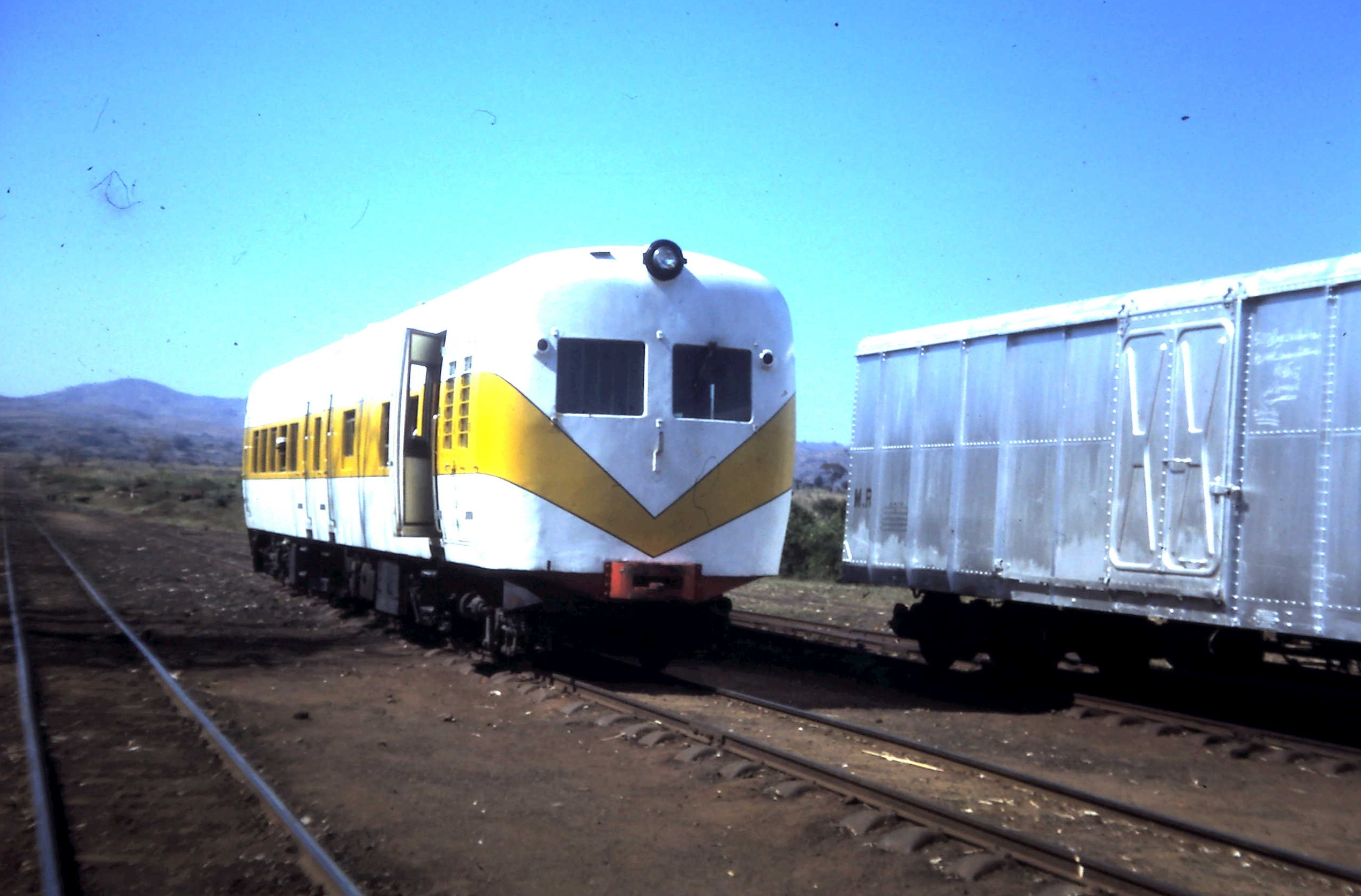
A Malawi Railways diesel railcar, 1984

The history of rail transport in Malawi began shortly after the turn of the twentieth century.

Transport by rail was introduced to British Central Africa Protectorate (BCA), the British protectorate occupying present-day Malawi, in 1904. Three years later, the name of the area was changed to Nyasaland.

Railways have continued to serve the area ever since, including in the period since Malawi became independent in 1964.

== British colonial period ==
=== Background ===
From the 1890s, small river steamers operated between Chinde, Mozambique, on one of the mouths of the Zambezi., and Chiromo, Malawi, on the Lower Shire River, a distance of 290 kilometres (180 mi). Above Chiromo, the Middle Shire is not navigable due falls and rapids. However, the main areas of economic activity in the BCA were around Blantyre in the Shire Highlands, over 80 km (50 mi) upriver from Chiromo. Transport between the two was costly and inefficient. Steamers also navigated the Upper Shire and Lake Nyasa (now Lake Malawi). Railways could supplement water transport and, as the BCA was nowhere nearer than 320 km (200 mi) to a suitable Indian Ocean port, a short rail link to river ports was more practical than a line direct to the coast.

=== Shire Highlands Railway ===
Water levels in the Shire River reduced after 1896 and made water transport more difficult. In 1901, the Shire Highlands Railway Company was formed by Blantyre-based investors to bypass the river in Nyasaland. It soon obtained a concession to build a railway from Port Herald (now Nsanje) on the Shire River at the southernmost point of the protectorate, to Fort Johnston (now Mangochi), at the southern end of Lake Nyasa, via Chiromo and Blantyre. The first section of this line, between Port Herald and Chiromo, was handed over to traffic on 1 September 1904.

Further construction of the railway was greatly hampered by a difference in elevation of more than 900 m (3,000 ft) between Chiromo and Blantyre. The difficulties were so severe that the Shire Highlands Railway ran out of funds, with the consequence that another company, the British South Africa Company, assumed the task of completing the section, which was finally opened on 23 January 1909. Additional reductions in the Shire River's flow made Port Herald unsatisfactory, so a Zambezi port was needed.

=== Central African Railway ===
In 1914, the British South Africa Company built the Central African Railway of 98 km (61 mi) from Port Herald/Nsanje to Chindio on the north bank of the Zambezi, about 40 km downstream from Muturara. From there, goods went by river steamers to Chinde then by sea to Beira, involving three transhipments and delays. The Central African Railway was poorly built, and soon needed extensive repairs.

=== Trans-Zambezia Railway ===
In the early 20th century, Beira developed as a major port: it was far superior to Chinde, which was severely damaged by a cyclone in 1922. In addition Beira was the port terminus for the Beira–Bulawayo Railway. The Trans-Zambezia Railway (TRZ), constructed between 1919 and 1922, ran 269 km (167 mi) from Dondo on the Beira–Bulawayo Railway to the south bank of the Zambezi at Murraca, across the river from Chindio. A ferry service linked the two rail termini. The TRZ promoters had interests in Beira port, and they ignored the high cost and limited benefit to Nyasaland of the TRZ to Beira compared to shorter alternative routes, such as to the small port of Quelimane.

River transport was practically defunct after 1935. The only recorded traffic on the Shire River within Nyasaland was a seasonal service run by the Shire Highlands Railway for the collection of cotton and other produce between Chiromo and Chikwawa.

=== Nyasaland Railways Limited ===
The Zambezi crossing remained the weak point in the link to Beira. The ferry used old steamers towing barges between Chindio on the north bank and Muracca on the south bank, and its capacity was limited. For two months a year the river was too shallow, at other times it flooded.

In 1930, Nyasaland Railways Limited was formed. The new company acquired the Shire Highlands Railway and Central African Railway, and made plans to extend the railway north and south. In 1935, the ferry was replaced by the construction of the Dona Ana Bridge (or Zambezi Bridge), over three kilometres (2 mi) long, creating an uninterrupted rail link from Nyasland to the sea. The new bridge crossed the Zambezi 39 km (24 mi) upstream from the Chindio-Muracca ferry, and required a new rail alignment on both banks, and the closure of the alignment to Chindio.

The northern extension from Blantyre to Salima near Lake Nyasa was also completed in 1935, and a terminal for lake services was developed at the nearby lake port of Chipoka. The government turned over operation of lake services to Nyasaland Railways, who operated cargo and passenger services between ports on the lake.

After the completion of the Dona Ana bridge, connecting the railway sections of Malawi and Mozambique became possible. When the sections were finally connected, the line between Dondo (Mozambique) and Blantyre (Malawi) was named the Sena railway.

=== Colonial railway operations ===
Unfortunately, the Zambezi Bridge and northern extension to Lake Nyasa created less traffic than anticipated, and it was only in 1946 that the traffic levels predicted in 1937 were reached. By this time, motor transport was becoming an alternative to rail, but government regulations designed to promote the use of the railway hindered the development of road transport. All the rail lines were Cape gauge and single track, and the Shire Highlands Railway in particular had sharp curves and steep gradients, so the system was inadequate for heavy train loads. Maintenance costs were high and freight volumes were low, so freight rates were up to three times those of Rhodesian and East African lines.

== Independent Malawi ==
Upon independence, Nyasaland Railways changed its name to Malawi Railways Limited.

On 17 May 1968 work began on a 101 km rail extension to connect Malawi Railways to the existing Nacala railway in Mozambique, to give Malawi access to the seaport of Nacala in northern Mozambique. The new railway connected to Malawi's north–south line (part of the Sena railway) at Nkaya, and to the existing Nacala line at Nova Freixo in Mozambique (present-day Cuamba). The line was inaugurated by President Hastings Banda on 4 July 1970 and began operations on 3 August. The project cost £5.4 million, financed by a long-term, low-interest loan from the Industrial Development Corporation of South Africa. An extension of the Sena railway, starting from the city Salima, towards the west, reaching Lilongwe and Mchinji, was completed in 1979.

Although costly and inefficient, the rail link to Beira remained a main bulk transport link until 1979 when it was destroyed by RENAMO forces in the Mozambican Civil War. By then, Malawi had its second rail link to the Mozambique port of Nacala. In 1984 the Nacala link was also lost, when the Nacala railway was destroyed by RENAMO forces.

Although the Sena railway sections in Mozambique were all reopened by 2025, the Malawian section from Marka to Blantyre had not reopened as of February 2026.

Lake services were separated from Malawi Railways in 1994.

The Nacala railway link was later restored, and is Malawi's principal route for imports and exports today. In 2017, the Nacala railway link was extended west from Nkaya junction to the coal mines at Moatize in Mozambique.

In 2010 a north-western extension of the main line was completed from Mchinji to Chipata in Zambia to provide Zambia with another export/import corridor. In 2013 the line was reported as idle because there are few facilities at Chipata. Freight services operated in 2014–2016 but have been idle since, though talks took place in 2025 between Zambia Railways and CFM on restarting.

== See also ==
- History of rail transport
- Eugene Sharrer
- History of Malawi
- Rail transport in Malawi
