= Cyclone Funso =

South-West Indian Ocean cyclone in 2012

Intense Tropical Cyclone Funso
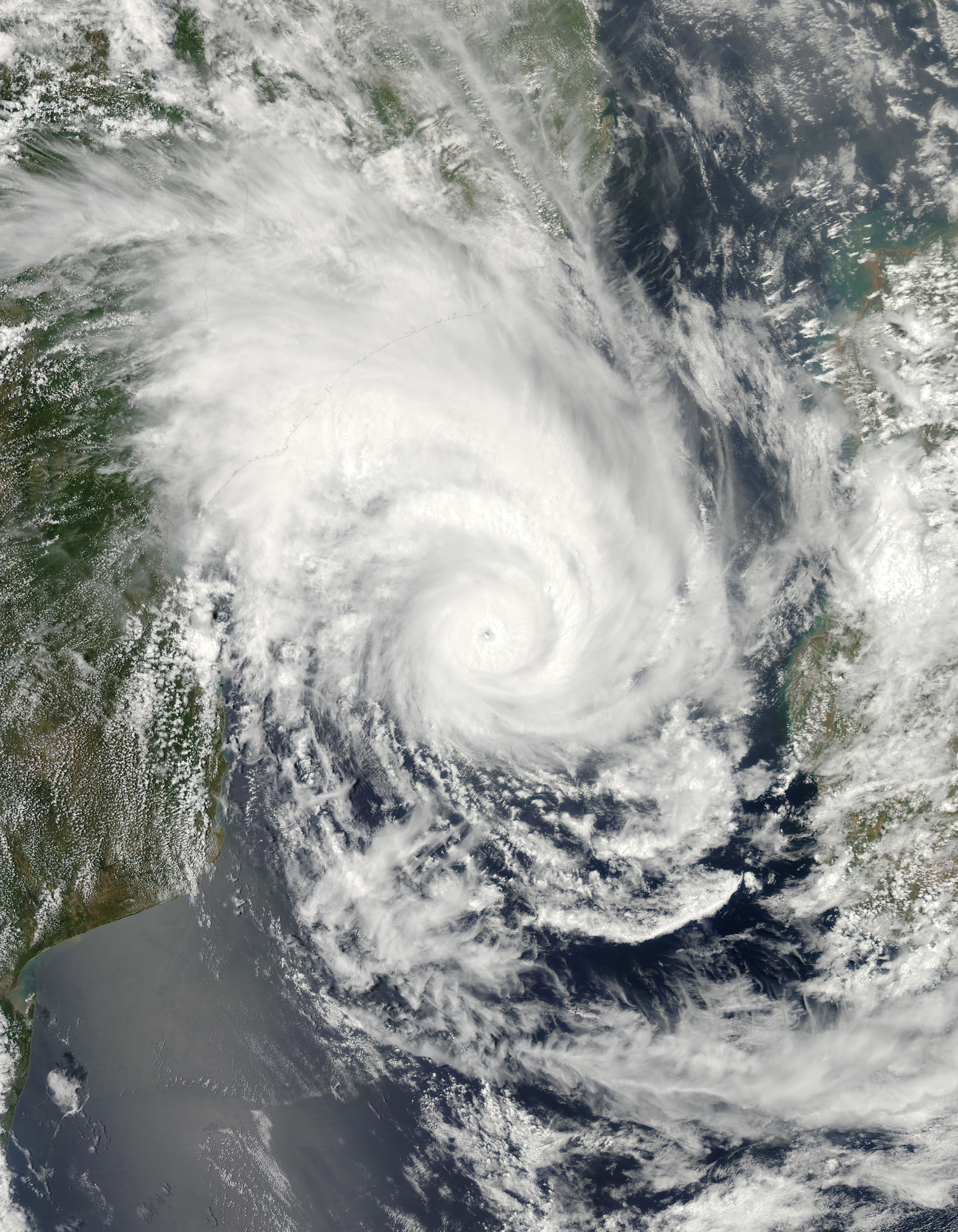
- Intense Tropical Cyclone Funso shortly after peak intensity on January 24, 2012

Meteorological history
- Formed: January 17, 2012
- Extratropical: January 28, 2012
- Dissipated: February 1, 2012

Intense tropical cyclone
- 10-minute sustained (MFR)
- Highest winds: 205 km/h (125 mph)
- Lowest pressure: 925 hPa (mbar); 27.32 inHg

Category 4-equivalent tropical cyclone
- 1-minute sustained (SSHWS/JTWC)
- Highest winds: 220 km/h (140 mph)
- Lowest pressure: 937 hPa (mbar); 27.67 inHg

Overall effects
- Fatalities: At least 40 total
- Damage: Unknown
- Areas affected: Mozambique, Malawi
- IBTrACS
- Part of the 2011–12 South-West Indian Ocean cyclone season

Intense Tropical Cyclone Funso was a powerful tropical cyclone which produced flooding in Mozambique and Malawi in January 2012. It resulted in at least 40 deaths, displaced thousands of residents, and destroyed hundreds of buildings. It was the eighth tropical cyclone, the sixth named storm and the second tropical cyclone to form during the 2011–12 South-West Indian Ocean cyclone season. Funso was also the first intense tropical cyclone since Gelane in 2010 and the first storm to affect Mozambique since Jokwe in 2008.

== Meteorological history ==
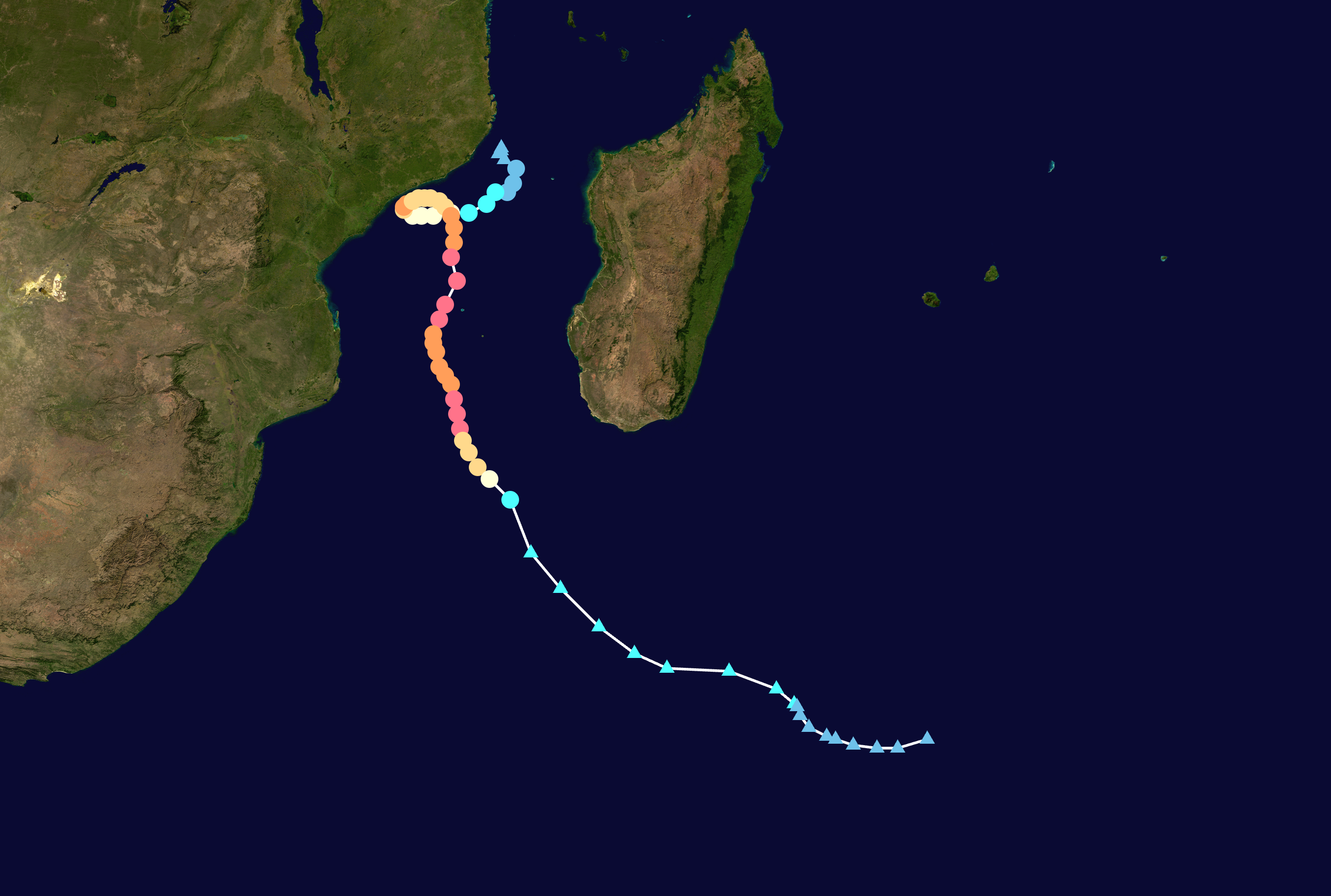
Map plotting the storm's track and intensity, according to the Saffir–Simpson scale Map key Saffir–Simpson scale Tropical depression (≤38 mph, ≤62 km/h) Tropical storm (39–73 mph, 63–118 km/h) Category 1 (74–95 mph, 119–153 km/h) Category 2 (96–110 mph, 154–177 km/h) Category 3 (111–129 mph, 178–208 km/h) Category 4 (130–156 mph, 209–251 km/h) Category 5 (≥157 mph, ≥252 km/h) Unknown Storm type Tropical cyclone Subtropical cyclone Extratropical cyclone, remnant low, tropical disturbance, or monsoon depression

The origins of Cyclone Funso were from an area of convection in the Mozambique Channel. On January 17, a low-level circulation developed in the area as the convection organized into intense rainbands. An upper-level anticyclone provided favorable conditions for development, including weak wind shear and good outflow. The system encountered warm sea surface temperatures, and favorable inflow from the south of its circulation was expected to increase after Subtropical Depression Dando dissipated over southern Africa. Late on January 18, the Joint Typhoon Warning Center (JTWC) issued a tropical cyclone formation alert, indicating a high chance of the system becoming a tropical cyclone. At 0000 UTC the next day, Météo-France (MF) classified it as Tropical Disturbance 8 about halfway between Mozambique and Madagascar in the northern Mozambique Channel. About six hours later, the agency upgraded the disturbance to a tropical depression, after the convection became better organized. The JTWC had also begun issuing advisories on the system by that time, labeling it Tropical Cyclone 08S.

Upon forming on January 19, the depression was moving to the southwest along the northern edge of a ridge. Though the system's low-level structure was disorganized, it gradually improved over the course of the day; MF upgraded the system to Moderate Tropical Storm Funso at 1200 UTC on January 19, or about 12 hours after its formation. Around that time, there was a warm spot, or a precursor to an eye, in the middle of a circular area of convection. Funso rapidly intensified after the eye became better established, and the MF upgraded the storm to a tropical cyclone – the equivalent of a 120 km/h (75 mph) hurricane – early on January 20. By that time, the outflow had increased significantly, partly due to an upper-level trough providing ventilation to the southeast. Shortly after Funso intensified into a tropical cyclone, the eye disappeared on satellite imagery, although this was due to the small size of the eyewall. Further intensification was forecast to be limited by the cyclone's interaction with the coast of Mozambique, as well as upwelling from its slow movement.

On January 20, Funso turned to the west and slowed, due to its position between a ridge to the northwest of Madagascar and another ridge near the Mozambique–South Africa border. The convection to storm's west over land diminished while the center remained well-organized. Despite land interaction, Funso intensified further, and the JTWC assessed 1 minute winds of 185 km/h (115 mph) early on January 21, based on the appearance of a well-defined eye 15 km (9.3 mi) in diameter. Around the same time, MF estimated the storm attained 10 minute maximum sustained winds of 165 km/h (103 mph), making Funso an intense tropical cyclone. At the time, the storm was located about 110 km (68 mi) east of Quelimane, Mozambique, and its movement was nearly stationary. By late on January 21, however, Funso weakened due to land disrupting the convection. A building ridge to the north forced the cyclone to the southeast into an area favorable for re-intensification. As the storm moved away from the Mozambique coastline, the convection became better organized, and the eye gradually reformed. Minimal wind shear, excellent outflow, and water temperatures of at least 28 °C (82 °F) allowed for significant strengthening. Late on January 23, the JTWC estimated 1 minute sustained winds of 215 km/h (134 mph), and the agency forecast further strengthening to 260 km/h (160 mph). Early the next day, MF estimated 10 minute sustained winds of 205 km/h (127 mph) about 330 km (210 mi) southeast of Quelimane, Mozambique.

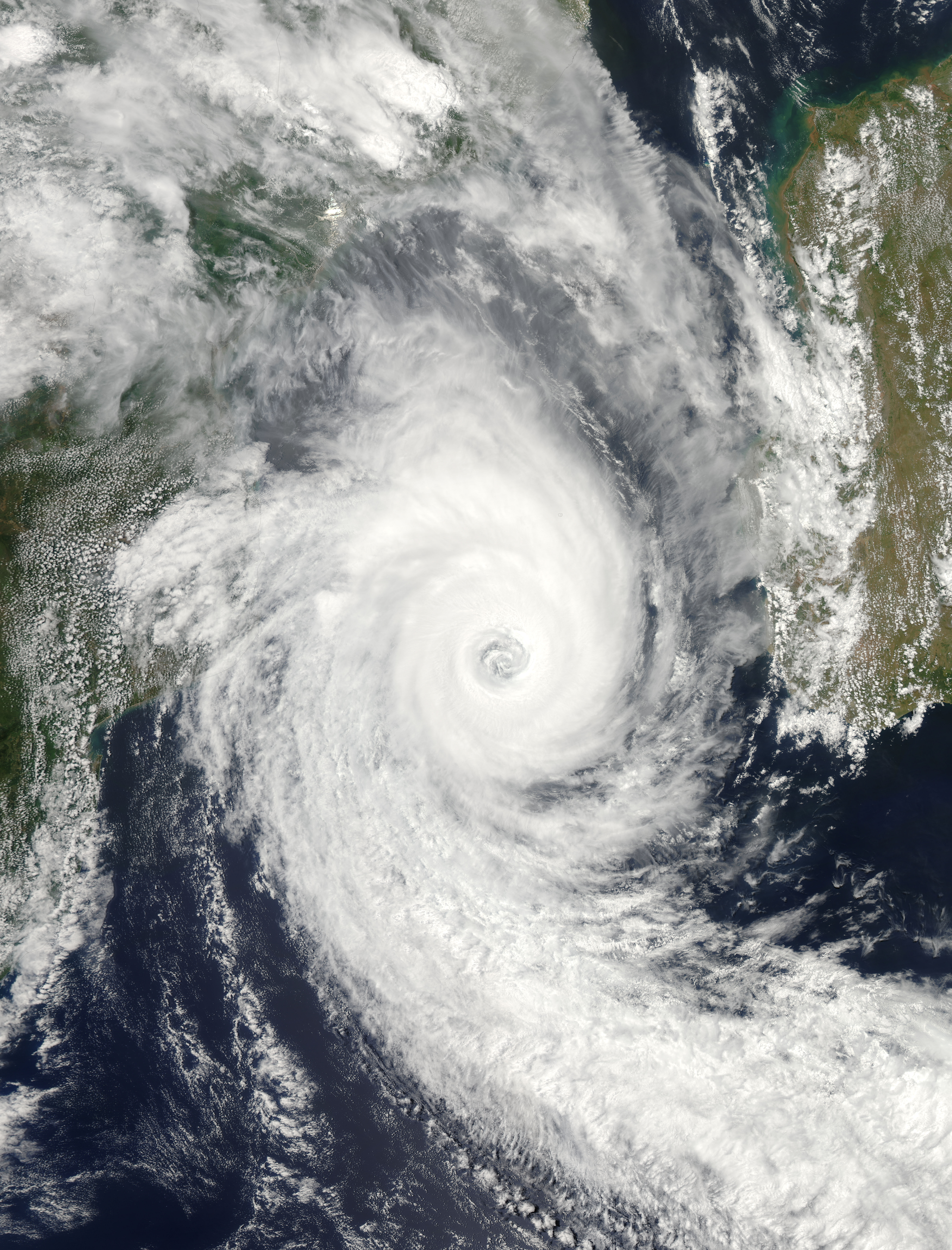
Intense Tropical Cyclone Funso on January 26, after an eyewall replacement cycle–the eye at the time of this image measured approximately 80 kilometers in diameter

After reaching peak intensity, Funso turned toward the southwest, due to a building ridge to its east. Late on January 24, the cyclone began an eyewall replacement cycle, which initiated a brief weakening trend. MF remarked that Funso weakened below intense tropical cyclone intensity early on January 25. At the same time, the JTWC estimated the cyclone intensified further to peak 1 minute sustained winds of 220 km/h (140 mph), based on estimates via the Dvorak technique. The agency noted that the eyewall replacement cycle finished and produced a well-defined eye 28 km (17 mi) in diameter. At 1200 UTC on January 25, MF again upgraded Funso to an intense tropical cyclone, and later that day the cyclone began another eyewall replacement cycle, and developed a larger eye measuring 55 kilometers across. Funso underwent another eyewall replacement cycle on January 27 as it started weakening. On January 27, the government of Mozambique formally announced that the cyclone had begun to gradually weaken, in the early-morning hours. Cyclone Funso posed no imminent threat to the northeastern coast of South Africa. On January 28, Funso rapidly weakened and transitioned into an extratropical cyclone, due to exposure to strong vertical wind shear, and colder sea surface temperatures below 25 °C. Funso's remnants continued moving eastward for the next few days, before dissipating on February 1.

== Impact and preparations ==
During the overnight hours of January 18, a ship carrying 54 people sank on its way from Anjouan to Mayotte amidst rough seas produced by Funso, while the developing storm remained offshore in its early stages. At least 15 passengers drowned while dozens remain missing.

Although the core of the storm never made landfall in Mozambique, over three million people there were affected by tropical storm-force winds. The most affected area was Zambezia Province, where twelve people were killed by Funso, and 2,571 families were directly affected as of January 23. Seven of the fatalities occurred in the Maganja da Costa District, where 1,610 houses were destroyed, and one death was in Zambezia's capital city of Quelimane, where heavy rainfall flooded most neighborhoods, owing to poor drainage systems. In the town, the flooding destroyed four houses, and several other cities along the coastline experienced flooding.

In Nicoadala District, the storm destroyed 66 houses and killed two people. Overall, more than 5000 people were displaced by the weather conditions. In Chokwe, at least 3,900 hectares of rice fields were flooded, while three people were missing in Guijá District, Gaza Province on January 25. After affecting the central Mozambique provinces, Funso brushed the coastline of the Inhambane Province in the south with rains and winds of 70 km/h (43 mph). At least 70,000 people were without a clean drinking water supply following the storm, and more than 56,000 were left homeless in Mozambique. The cyclone hit the country about a week after Subtropical Depression Dando struck southern Mozambique, causing flooding and deaths.

Initial forecasts suggested that the cyclone would impact South Africa or make landfall in southern Mozambique, but this became less likely as the storm continued tracking south. Nevertheless, some local tourists voluntarily evacuated the coastal city of Inhambane in Mozambique in anticipation of the storm.

In Malawi, a country adjacent to Mozambique, the cyclone dropped heavy rainfall, causing two rivers near Nsanje to exceed their banks and flood nearby villages. Authorities were concerned about the fate of more than 450 families that lost their homes in the southern Nsanje District due to the effects of Funso, which mostly affected Bangula and Phokela, as three rivers overflowed. Across Southern Malawi, the storm destroyed more than 320 houses and flooded 125 more, primarily in Bangula and Phokela. As a result, about 5,000 people had to evacuate their homes during flooding on the Shire River and Ruo River, many of whom requiring rescue by helicopter or motorboat as they were stranded in the remaining unflooded areas of land. At least 30 villages became isolated after flooding destroyed roads and bridges between Blantyre and Nsanje. The flooding also killed livestock and affected maize fields, leaving whole communities at risk of starvation.

As the cyclone retreated southward, waves up to 11.5 m (38 ft) occurred on the coasts of southern Mozambique and western Madagascar.

=== Ongoing floods ===
The impact of Cyclone Funso stalling over Zambezia Province worsened an ongoing flood situation that had been exacerbated by monsoon rains, producing flooding in Mozambique, Malawi, South Africa and Swaziland. Prior to Funso's impact, the landfall of Subtropical Depression Dando on January 16 over southeastern Africa killed at least ten people in Mozambique and South Africa, including six people in Mpumalanga Province in South Africa; Mpumalanga and Limpopo were the regions most heavily affected. During the inland flooding triggered by Dando, several drownings occurred, including one man swept away on the Mbuluzi River in Swaziland. Dando was the first tropical cyclone to impact southern Mozambique since Domoina in 1984.

In Mozambique, flooding from the tropical cyclones cut off the arterial North-South Highway to Maputo, the capital of the country, as the Komati River flooded its banks. Traffic re-opened by January 24. High water levels occurred on the Movene River, an upstream tributary of the Umbeluzi River from which Maputo gets its water supply, which limited access to the treatment plant, leaving the city's water polluted. By January 25, twenty-five fatalities were confirmed from the combined flooding caused by Dando and Funso, including 16 in Zambezia and 9 in Gaza Province, where the initial flooding from Dando affected 5,393 families. Flooding also occurred in Inhambane Province.

Tens of thousands of people were made homeless in the floods, and authorities expected the casualty toll to rise. Meteorologists predicted the flooding rains to continue for most of Mozambique throughout the first months of 2012.

== See also ==
- 2000 Mozambique flood
- Cyclone Idai
