= Shire Highlands Railway Company =

Private railway company in colonial Nyasaland

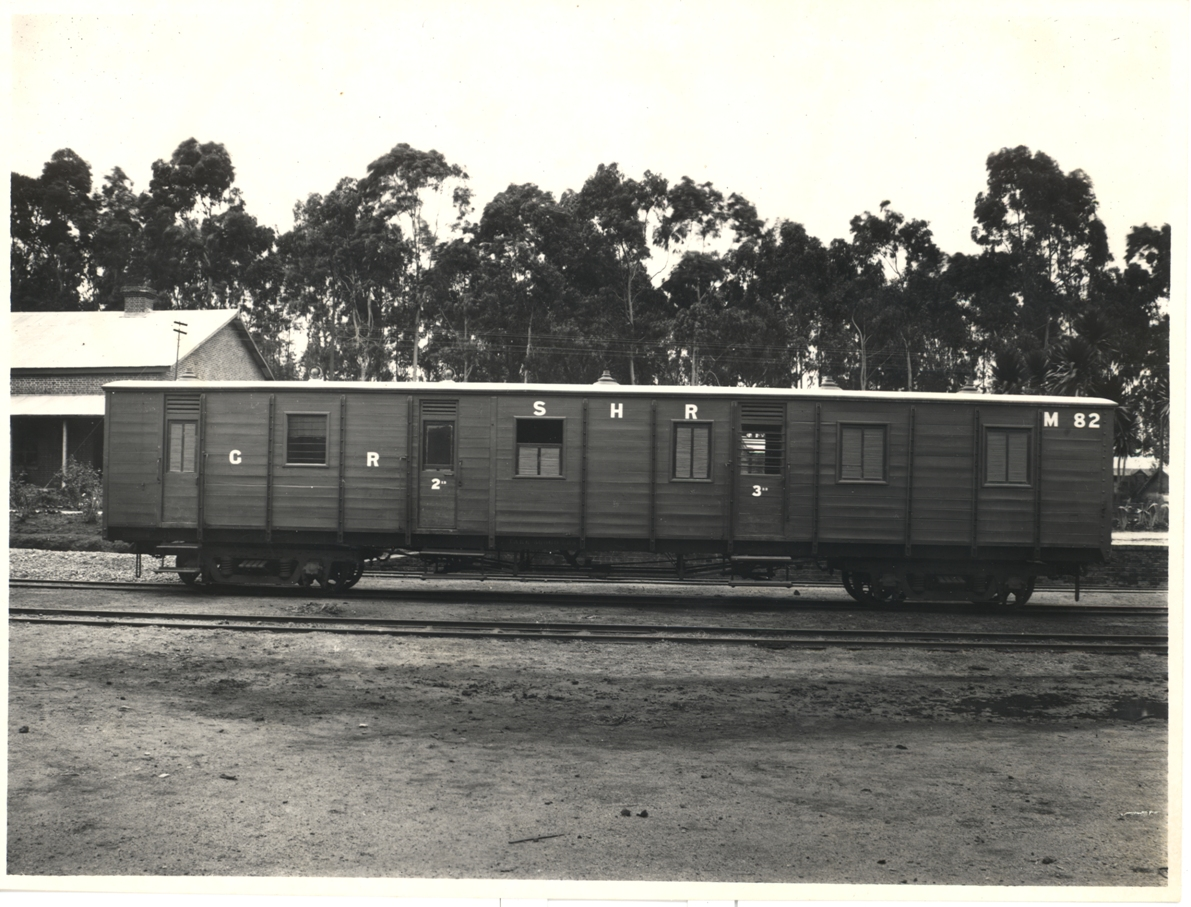
2nd and 3rd class carriage M 82 of the Shire Highlands Railway

The Shire Highlands Railway Company Ltd was a private railway company in colonial Nyasaland, incorporated in 1895 with the intention of constructing a railway from Blantyre (in modern-day Malawi) to the effective head of navigation of the Shire River. After problems with routing and finance, a South African 3 ft 6 in (1,067 mm) gauge railway was constructed between 1903 and 1907, and extended in 1908 to a Nsanje, a distance of 113 miles (182 km) as water levels in the Shire River fell.

As navigational problems in the Shire River continued, in 1912 the Shire Highlands Railway Company contributed to the construction by the British South Africa Company of the Central African Railway of 61 miles (98 km) to the Zambezi, almost entirely within Mozambique. Although this line, completed in 1914, was owned by the separate Central Africa Railway Company Ltd, the Shire Highlands Railway Company operated all services on its line and was part-owner of its shares. In 1935, the railway undertaking of the Shire Highlands Railway and shares it held in the Central Africa Railway Company Ltd were transferred to a new company, Nyasaland Railways Ltd.

It was the operating company of the Sena railway, also called the Shire Highlands railway.

== Formation of the railway undertaking ==
In the late 19th and early 20th century, the land-locked Nyasaland protectorate lacked railways and could only be reached from the nearest Indian Ocean ports, some 200 miles (320 km) away, through the Zambezi and Shire rivers, which were too shallow for large vessels. The protectorate’s main settlements and its areas of economic activity were some way from the Shire River ports, and transport to and from these was by inefficient and costly head porterage. Between 1896 and 1934, low water levels in Lake Nyasa reduced the water flow in the Shire River, and the main river port was moved downstream to Chiromo further from the main settlements below a steep escarpment, from where steamers carrying 100 tons or less had to negotiate Lower Shire marshes and low-water hazards in the Zambezi and its delta to reach the small, poorly equipped coastal port of Chinde.

The difficulties and cost of river transport provoked the idea of a rail link to the Indian Ocean and, as early as 1895, Harry Johnston the Commissioner and Consul-General of the protectorate suggested a line from its main commercial town, Blantyre, to Quelimane in Mozambique. However, most of this proposed route ran through Portuguese territory, and Quelimane was only suitable for small ships with a draught of less than 5 metres until redeveloped after 1958. In the same year, Eugene Sharrer proposed building a railway from Blantyre to Chiromo, and he published the prospectus for the company he formed, the Shire Highlands Railway Company Ltd, in December 1895.

For Nyasaland, a short rail link to Shire River ports that eliminated porterage was the best option. This was because ratio of transport cost to the expected value of exports was high, so a longer line direct to the Indian Ocean passing through areas where little local freight was expected was unlikely to be viable.

Although Johnston the accepted the Blantyre to Chiromo route and urged the Foreign Office to finance this railway, it declined to do so. However, in 1901 it agreed in principle to the construction of a railway by the Shire Highlands Railway Company Ltd from Blantyre to the lower Shire and granted the company 361,600 acres of land adjacent to the railway without charge. As Sharrer had acquired much of the land over which the proposed railway was to run, there was disagreement over the route, particularly from the African Lakes Corporation. Because of this, and delays over raising capital and loans for construction, it was not until early 1903 that construction began.

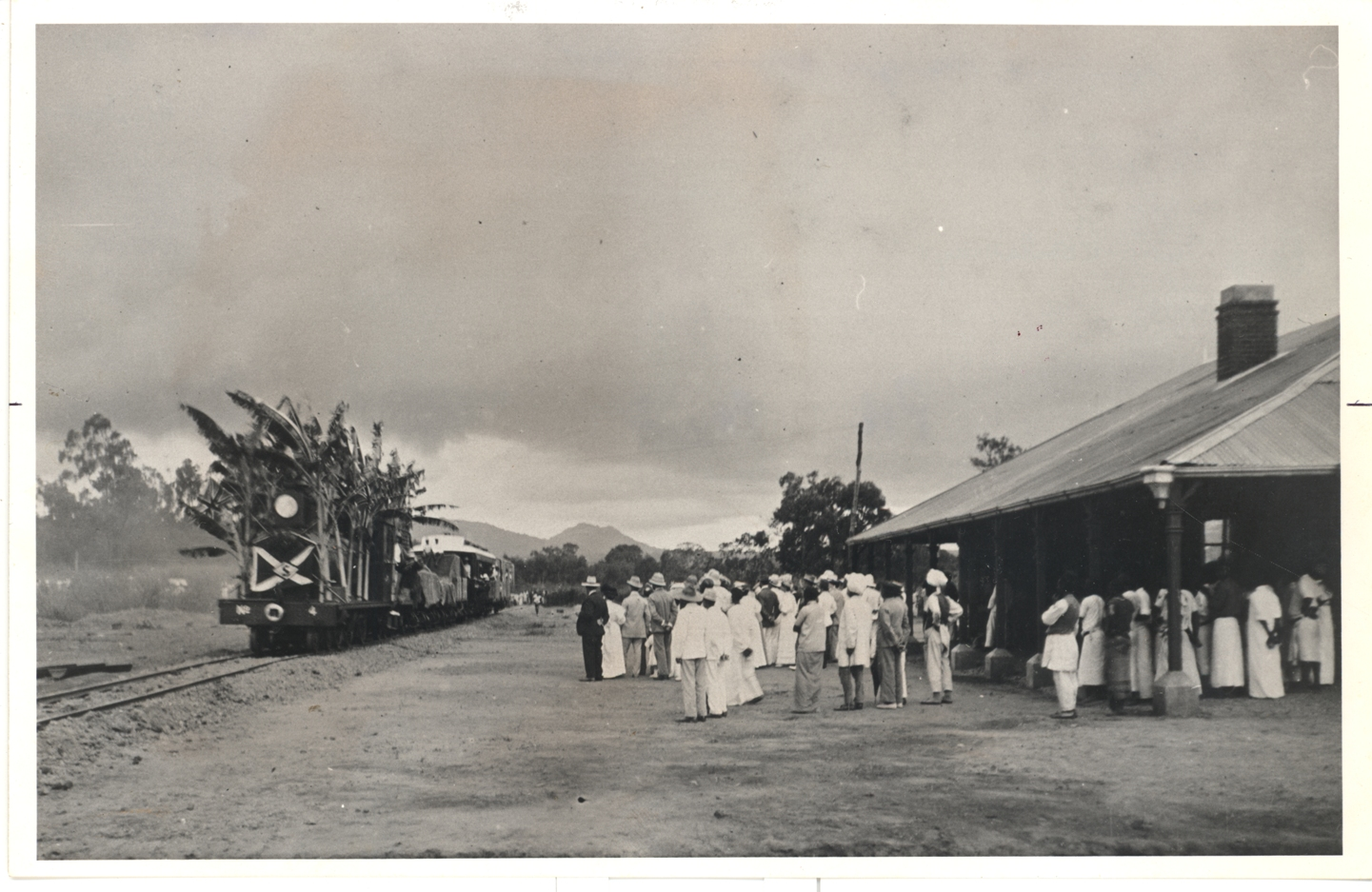
The first train in Blantyre

The line was opened from Blantyre to Chiromo in 1907, but further falls in the level of the Shire River meant that the line had to be extended to Port Herald, 113 miles (182 km) from Blantyre, in 1908.

Sharrer became a director of the Shire Highlands Railway Company Ltd and continued as such after he left the protectorate in 1902. He was also a director of the Central Africa Railway Company Ltd which was built after his departure.

== Extension to the Zambezi and beyond ==
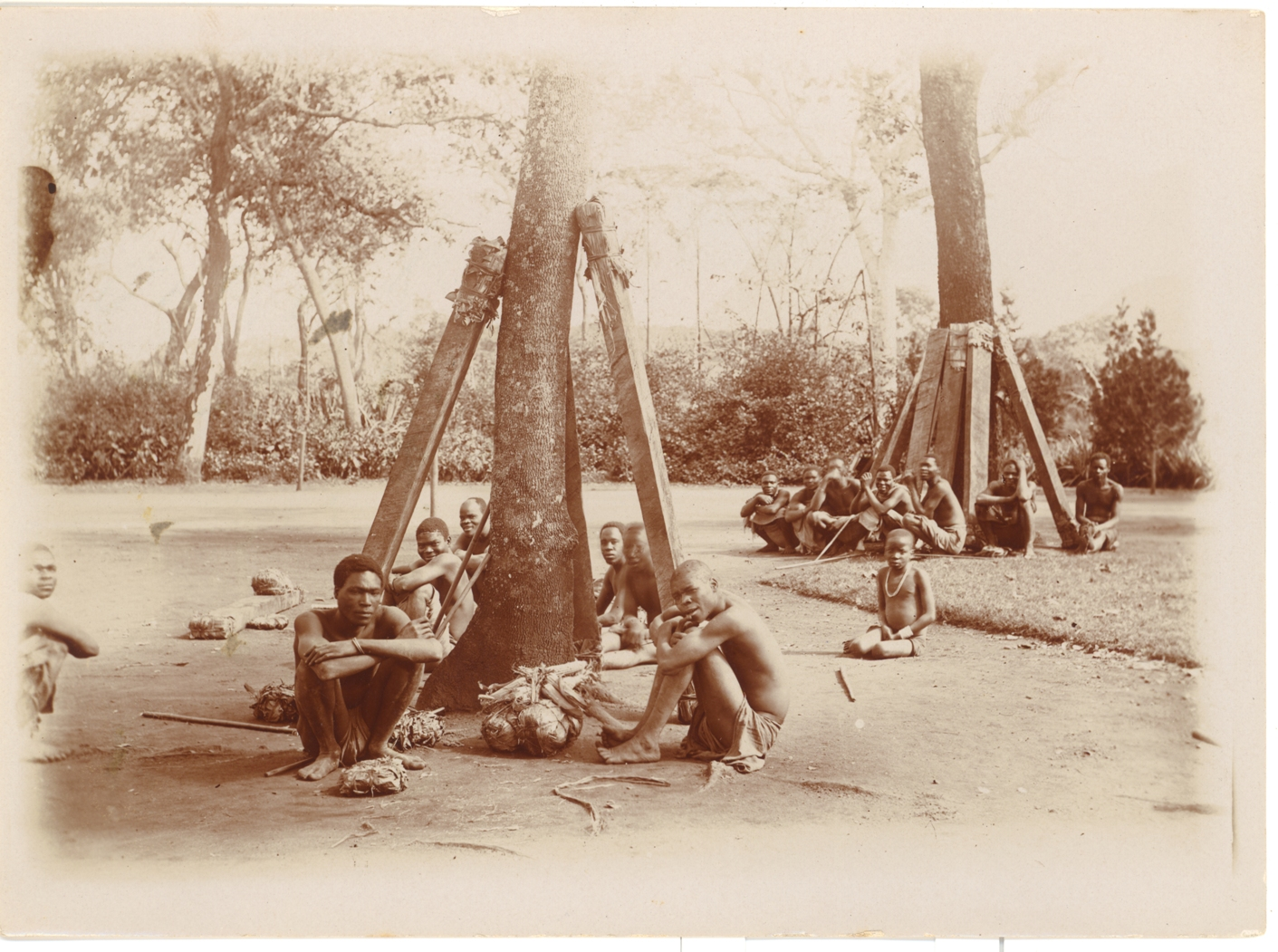
'Ready for the road with sleepers for the Shire Highlands Railway.' From the Estate of Henry Brown.

Further falls in Shire River level made it difficult, and often impossible, to use Port Herald for much of the year, so a port on the Zambezi river was needed. The British South Africa Company already had a concession to build a railway in Portuguese territory, and in 1912 the Nyasaland government agreed with the Shire Highlands Railway Company Ltd that it would redeem the land it had previously granted to the company for £180,800, and that company would pay this to British South Africa Company to assist with the construction costs of the Central African Railway in exchange for shares in the Central Africa Railway Company Ltd. This railway of 61 miles (98 km) from Port Herald to Chindio on the north bank of the Zambezi was completed in 1914. From here, river steamers went to Chinde on one of the mouths of the Zambezi, from where sea-going lighters continued to Beira, Mozambique. Although this route allowed Beira’s port to be used, it took two to three weeks to transport goods from Blantyre, involved three transhipments and exposed goods to the risk of water damage. The Central African Railway was expensive to construct yet poorly built, and soon needed extensive repairs. The Nyasaland government agreed support the line to Chindio financially for ten years, and paid on average £20,000 until 1924.

In 1922, the Trans-Zambezia Railway Company completed a line, which had been approved by the Portuguese government, from Beira to Murracca on the Zambezi, opposite Chindio, so there was an almost-complete rail link from Blantyre to Beira except for the short river crossing by ferry. This was inconvenient and, in 1927, the British government commissioned a report on building the Dona Ana Bridge. When this bridge was completed in 1935, a new company, Nyasaland Railways Ltd was formed to take over the undertaking of the Shire Highlands Railway and the issued share capital of the Central Africa Railway Company Ltd. Nyasaland Railways Ltd retained responsibility for these railways until they were transferred in 1953 to the Federal government of the Federation of Rhodesia and Nyasaland.

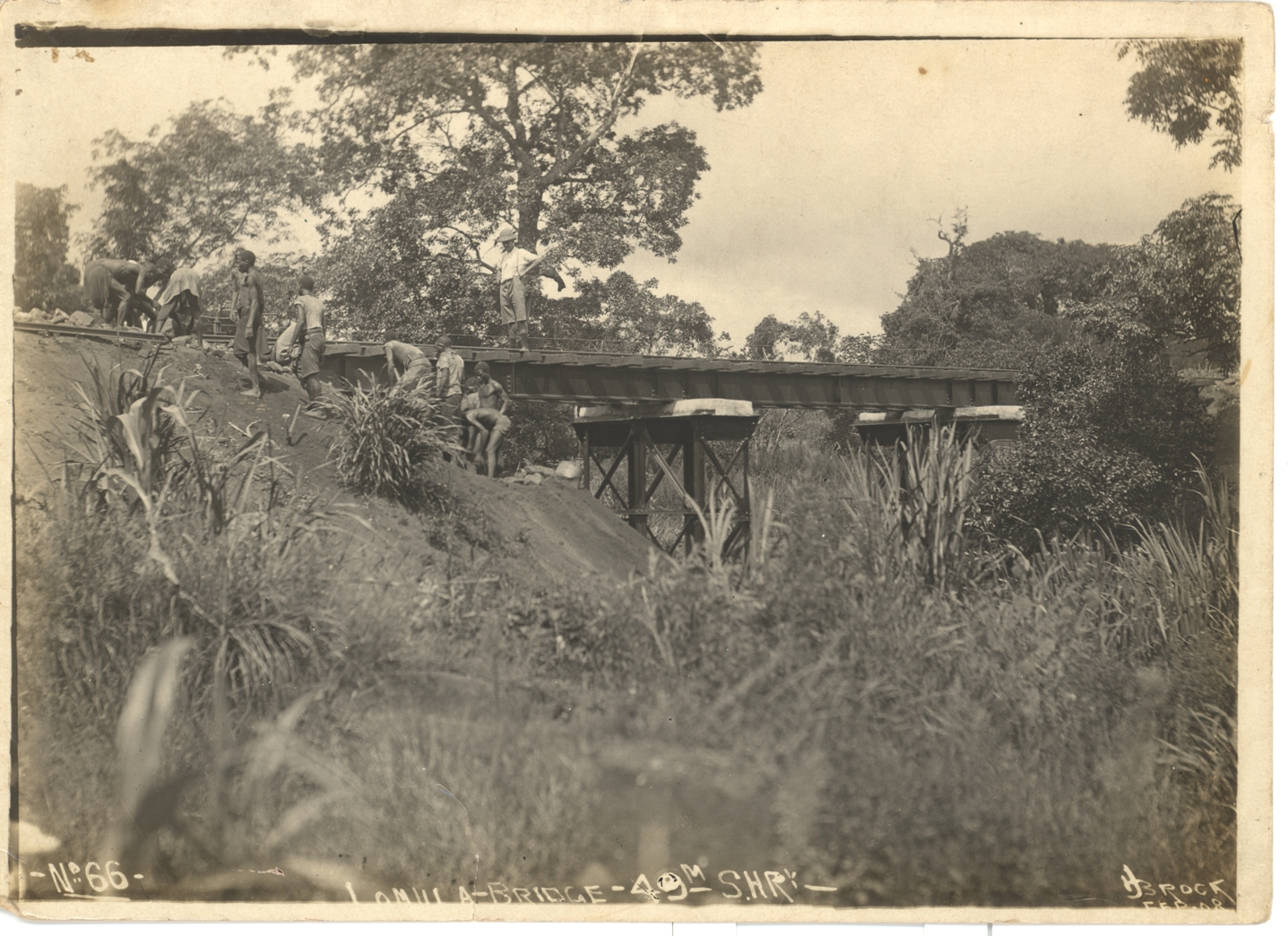
Lomula Bridge of the Shire Highlands Railway. February 1908

Railways in Nyasaland were expensive to build and operated in difficult terrain involving costly maintenance, and used expensive imported coal as fuel. They carried relatively low tonnages, with little domestic traffic, relying instead on carrying exports and imports that varied in amount and type by season. Because of this, they charged up to three times the Rhodesian or East African rates for general freight. The UK Treasury and Nyasaland government provided some subsidies, but these still left freight very high.

== Locomotives ==
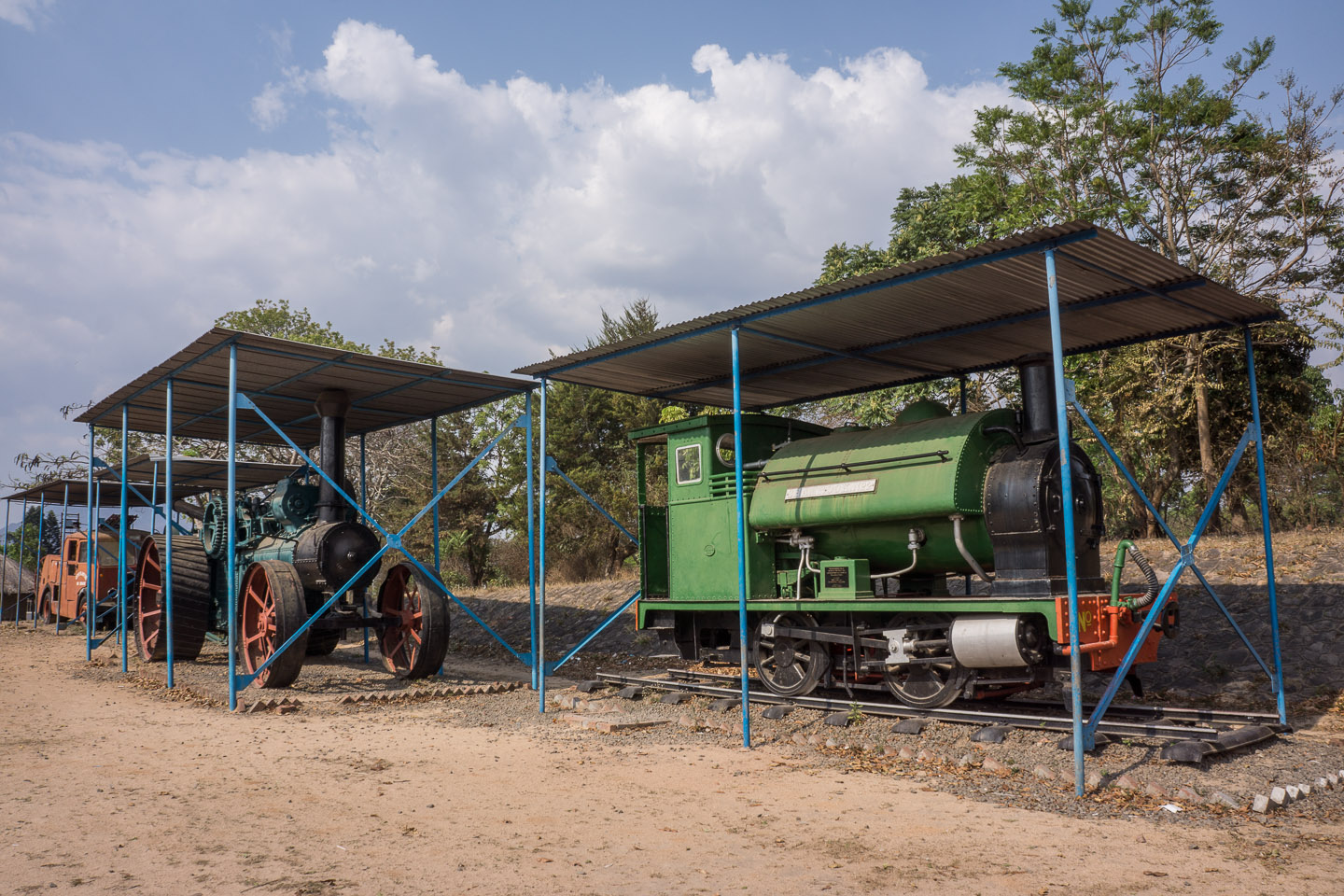
Steam locomotive 'Shamrock' in Chichiri Museum in Blantyre

The original locomotives of the Shire Highlands Railway Company, acquired in 1904 to work on building the line, were two 0-4-0 inside cylinder, saddle-tank locomotives from Messrs. W.G. Bagnall Ltd. of Stafford. These were the 'A' Class locomotives, 'Thistle', No. 1 and 'Shamrock', No. 2 and they served on the Shire Highlands and Central Africa railways mainly on shunting and construction work for many years. 'Thistle' is preserved at Limbe Station and 'Shamrock' at the Chichiri Museum, Blantyre.

Two 'B' Class 4-6-0 engines with outside cylinder and inside motion and built by Messrs. Kitson & Co. Ltd. of Leeds were also acquired in 1904. 'Rhodes' and 'Milner', Nos. 5 and 6 respectively, were main line haulers and worked the mail trains between the Zambezi and Blantyre. 'Milner' also worked on Trans-Zambezia Railway from July 1923 to 1934 and from the Dona Ana Bridge to Tete, until 1944. 'Rhodes' continued in main line service until 1951. One 'C Class locomotive worked on the railways for a short period.

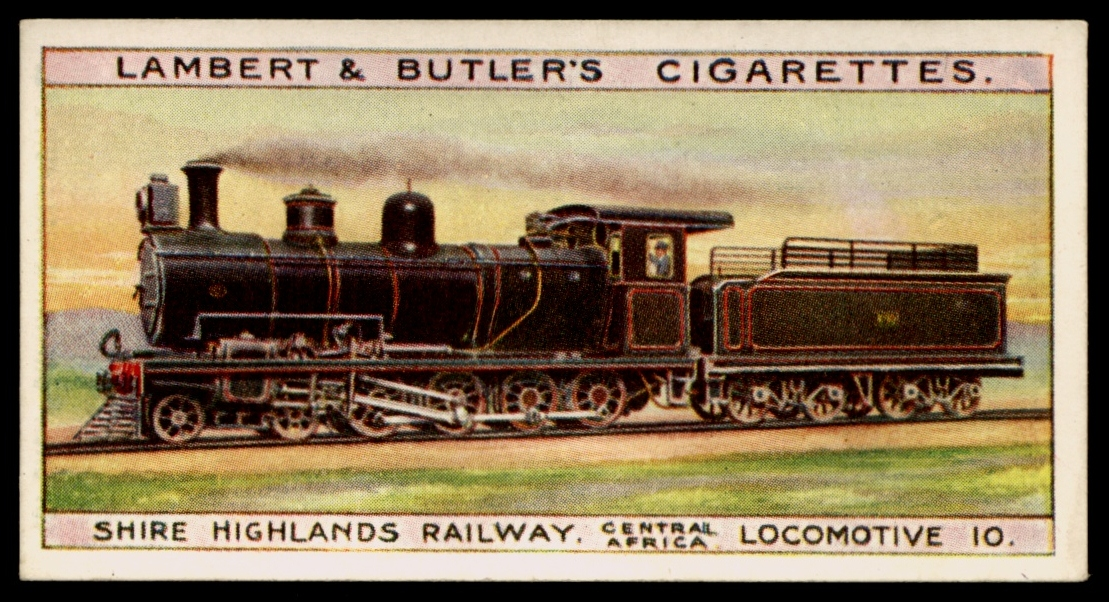
Shire Highlands Railway locomotive on Lambert & Butler's Cigarettes card

The next major type was the 'D' Class, type 4-8-0 with bogie tender, some purchased in 1917 from Messrs. R. & W. Hawthorn, Leslie and Peckett of Newcastle-upon-Tyne, others in 1930 from North British Locomotive Works, Glasgow. The Shire Highlands and Central Africa railways operated Nos. 8 to 12 and 19 to 24 and the Trans-Zambezia line took over Nos. 13, to 15, all of which were main line haulers and pulled trains on all sections of the system. Typical loads were: Border to Sankulani at the base of the escarpment 450 tons, and uphill from Sankulani to Limbe 180 tons.

In 1936, the Nyasaland Railways Ltd owned 11 locomotives, 3 railcars, 18 coaches and 84 goods wagons.
