= RSZ =

RSZ may refer to:

- Railway Systems of Zambia, a defunct Zambian private railway company
- RSZ, the DS100 code for Schwetzingen station, Baden-Württemberg, Germany
