= Marka, Malawi =

Marka
- Location in Malawi
- Coordinates: 17°07′11.8″S 35°13′36.8″E
- Country: Malawi
- Region: Southern Region
- Time zone: +2
- Climate: Cwa

Marka is a town located in Nsanje District in Malawi. It is the southernmost location in the country, serving as a border post for road and rail control between Malawi and Mozambique.

The Mozambican town of Vila Nova de Fronteira is conurbed with Marka. In addition, Marka is part of a large conurbation zone that extends northwards, passing through the city of Nsanje to the city of Bangula.

== Transport ==
The M1 road is the main source of transportation that connects the district to its neighboring district, Chikwawa. Before 2010, transportation to the lower shire district was difficult especially during rainy season.

The town had a railway station on the Sena railway, part of the Malawi Railways. The railway through Marka that connects Nsanje and Blantyre with Beira was severely disrupted by the Mozambique Civil War and remains closed. In the late 1990s, part of the railway was damaged at Chiromo bridge near Bangula. Due to this damage, the train station at Nsanje was closed.

Some of the line was repaired in 2024 when the first train of oil for 41 years arrived in Marka. From there the oil can travel by road to Blantyre.
