= Sankulani =

Coordinates: 16°28′00″S 35°14′00″E

Sankulani is a town in southern Malawi on the Ruo River which defines the border with Mozambique.

== History ==
For several decades in the early 20th century, a sisal plantation was operated in the region between Sankulani and Chiromo.

== Environment ==
Due to the town's proximity to the confluence of the Ruo River and the Shire River, it is exposed to flood risks.

== Transport ==
It is served by a station on the southern line of the national railway system which connects with Mozambique. The railway in this stretch closely follows the border with Mozambique. Near this station, the railway leaves the plains to the south and enters the mountains to the north.

== Namesake ==
There is another town in Malawi with this name in the Lilongwe district.

== See also ==
- Railway stations in Malawi
