= Bangula =

Coordinates: 16°35′00″S 35°07′00″E

Bangula is a town of about 5000 population in southern region district of Nsanje in Malawi. There is also a commune of the same name. Its elevation is 100m. It is located on the western bank of the Shire River, near the confluence of the Shire and Ruo River. After extensive flooding in Chiromo (on the eastern bank of the Shire), the municipalities were moved to Bangula (postal and police). The name Bangula is roughly translated to 'place where the lions roar' – although few to no lions exist in the area anymore.

== Transport ==
Bangula was served by a station on the Sena railway system which heads to Mozambique but this has been closed since 1997 when the Chiromo bridge over the Shire River collapsed.

An unstaffed, dirt airstrip provides landing facilities for light aircraft.

The main highway between Nsanje and Blantyre runs through Bangula.

== See also ==
- Railway stations in Malawi
