= 1989 Malawi earthquake =

Natural disaster in Malawi

- Location within Malawi
- UTC time: 1989-03-10 21:49:47
- ISC event: 409791
- USGS-ANSS: ComCat
- Local date: 10 March 1989
- Local time: 23:49:47
- Magnitude: 6.3 M_{w}
- Depth: 28 km (17 mi)
- Epicenter: 13.74°S 34.41°E
- Type: Dip-slip
- Areas affected: Malawi
- Max. intensity: MMI VIII (Severe)
- Casualties: At least 9 people killed and 100 injured

The 1989 Malawi earthquake occurred on 10 March in central Malawi, with a moment magnitude of 6.3 and a maximum Mercalli intensity of VIII (Severe). It was preceded by a number of foreshocks, the largest being a 5.7 M_{w} shock on the previous day. The earthquake was felt strongly throughout central Malawi, and also felt in parts of Mozambique (Niassa and Tete Provinces) and Zambia (Eastern Province). Nine people were killed, with many others injured or left homeless.

== Geology ==
The 1989 Malawi earthquake was the result of a dip-slip fault in the Malawi rift system, part of the larger East African Rift. It is believed to have occurred at a depth of about 30 km (19 mi), with the lack of surface faulting being attributed to its occurrence at a relatively deep level.

The International Seismological Centre (ISC) placed the epicentre of the 1989 Malawi earthquake at 13.74°S 34.41°E, although the accuracy of their determination was affected by the lack of seismic stations in the area – the closest was 300 km (190 mi) away, and there were only two within 900 km (560 mi). It has been suggested that the margin of error for the epicentre is consequently around 20 km (12 mi).

The earthquake triggered landslides in the Manyani Hills, around 90 km (56 mi) east northeast of Kasungu. Slumping of 2 km (1.2 mi) in length and 1 km (0.62 mi) in width was observed, and attributed to heavy rainfall earlier in the year combined with deforestation-related soil exposure. There was also a large rock fall in the Chongomi Mountains of Dedza District, which resulted in hillside scarring. However, both of those areas were sparsely populated, and there were no reported casualties.

== Damage and casualties ==
Nine people are known to have been killed as a result of the earthquake – six in Dedza, two in Salima, and one in Chitala. At least two of the deaths (one in Dedza and one in Chitala) were caused by roof collapses, in both cases occurring in houses with roofs built from blocks of baked clay (a non-standard method of construction). The total number of injuries from the earthquake has been estimated at 100, and the total number of people left homeless at about 50,000.

Urban areas were worst affected by the quake, as houses were more likely to be built of brick and thus more susceptible to cracking. The major building with the most visible damage was the Nanjoka Railway Station complex, which developed severe cracks in its walls and was subsequently abandoned. The Chitala Farm Institute, an agricultural school, was also heavily damaged. In rural areas, most dwellings were simple huts, built by pasting mud or clay onto timber frames. These were left mostly undamaged.

== Aftermath ==
In the same month as the earthquake, Malawi was hit by a cyclone and suffered severe flooding. The combination of natural disasters left over 200,000 people homeless and led to the government appealing for international assistance. A field study conducted in October 1989 concluded that the March 1989 earthquake "should be treated as an eye opener, drawing attention to the potential of medium-size earthquakes hitting major cities in Malawi".
