= Sena railway =

Railway line in Africa

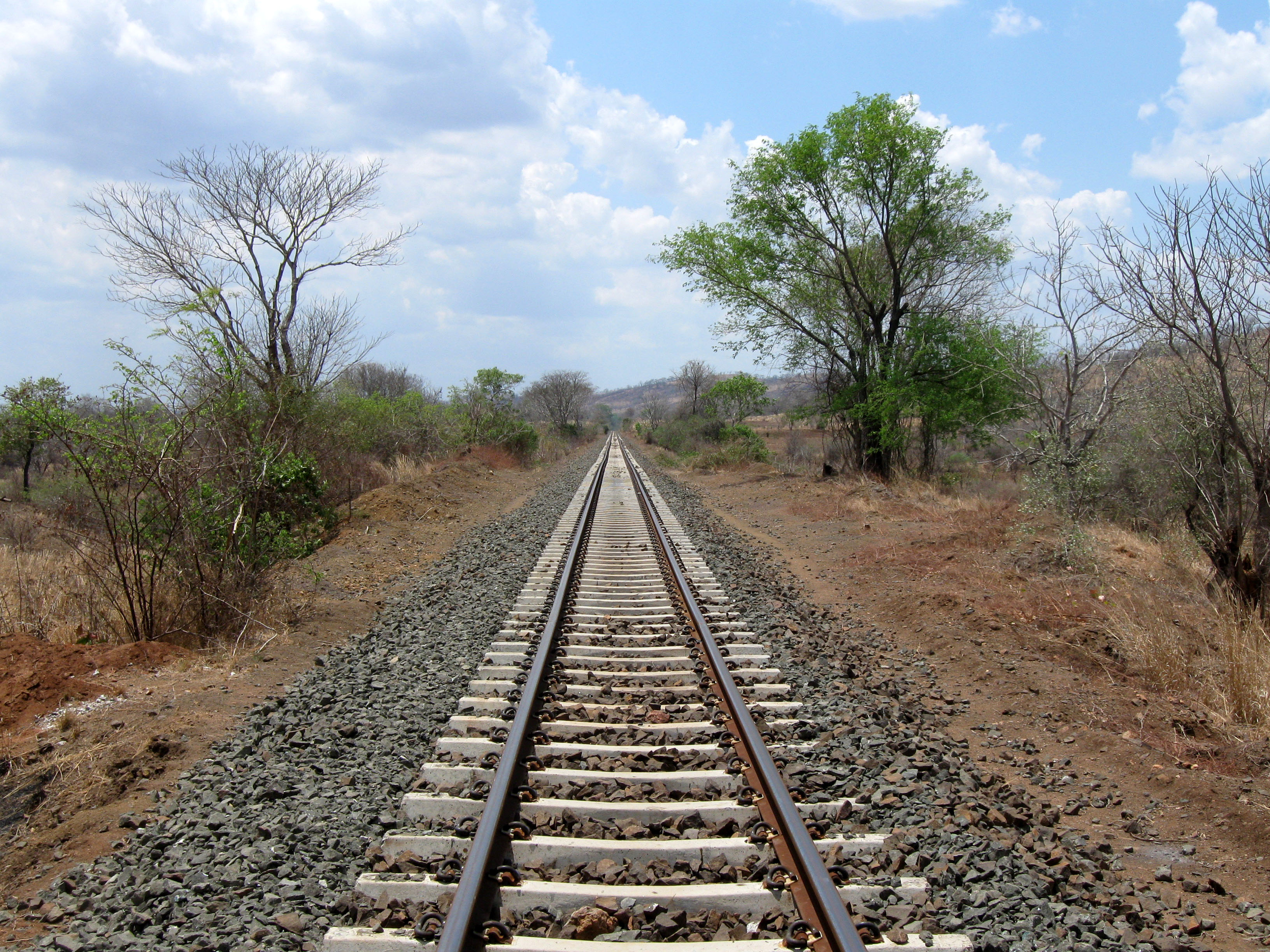

Overview
- Status: Operational
- Termini: Dondo, Mozambique; Chipata, Zambia

Service
- Type: Cape gauge
- Operator(s): CFM, CEAR and ZR

History
- Opened: 1904

Technical
- Line length: c. 1,000 km (620 mi)
- Track gauge: 1,067 mm (3 ft 6 in)

The Sena railway, also called the Dondo-Malawi railway, and encompassing the Shire Highlands railway and the North-South Malawi railway, is a railway that connects Dondo, Mozambique, to Mchinji in Malawi and Chipata in Zambia. It is c.1000 km long, in a 1067 mm gauge. It connects to the Nacala Railway at Nkaya and Moatize, and to the Machipanda line from Beira to Zimbabwe at Dondo.

On the Mozambican stretch between Dondo and Vila Nova de Fronteira, and on the two branch lines, the managing company is Mozambique Ports and Railways (CFM); on the Malawian stretch, between the cities of Marka and Mchinji, the administration is done by the company Central East African Railways (CEAR). In the short stretch in the territory of Zambia, between the cities of Mwami and Chipata, the railway is controlled by the company Zambia Railways (ZR).

Its main maritime logistics facilities are at the port of Beira and port of Nacala.

== History ==
Initially the Sena railway had the function of connecting the Protectorate of Nyasaland (currently Malawi) from north to south, using waterways to reach seaports.

=== Construction ===
In 1901, the Shire Highlands Railway Company was formed in Blantyre by British investors. They soon obtained a concession to build a railway connecting Nsanje, on the Shire River (at the southernmost point of the protectorate), to Mangochi, at the southern end of Lake Malawi, via Chiromo and Blantyre. The first section of this line, between Nsanje and Chiromo, was opened to traffic on 1 September 1904. The contract for the construction of a branch was awarded to the British South Africa Company, connecting Chindio and Nsanje, the latter becoming an important waterway connection port with the maritime city of Beira. The irregular river flow in the region — sometimes with large and destructive floods, sometimes with severe droughts — made safe navigation almost impossible, causing this option to be discarded and the continuation of a railway line to Quelimane to be abandoned.

The effective planning of what is currently the Sena railway would only begin in 1912, when a common understanding was signed between Nyasaland and the Portuguese administration in Mozambique, for the construction of a railway line that would connect Beira to the African Great Lakes.

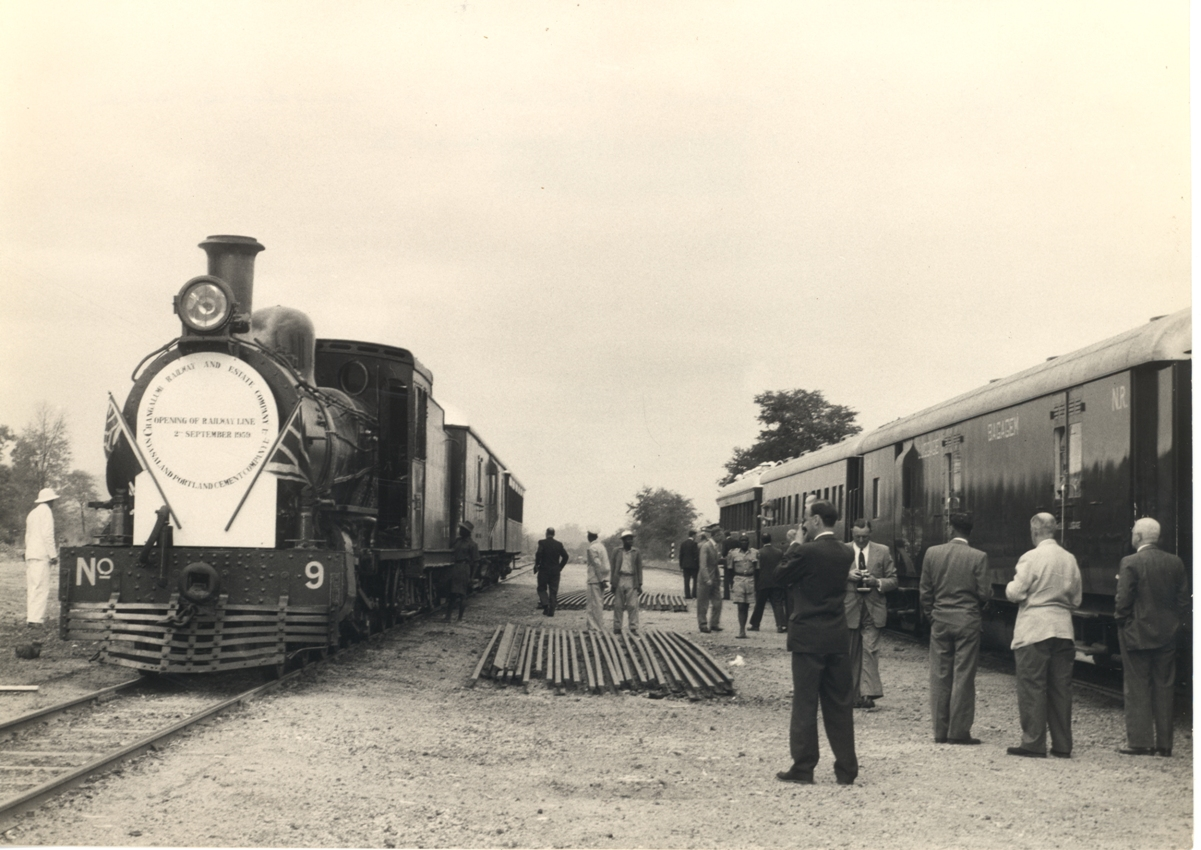
Reopening of part of the section between Blantyre and Salima, in 1959, around the village of Changalume.

Between 1919 and 1922, Trans-Zambezia Railways, company winner of the tender for the construction of the southern section, concluded the connection between Dondo and Vila de Sena, in front of the city of Nhamayabué (or Mutarara), on the Zambezi River. The rest of the railway on the Mozambican side, between Nhamayabué and Vila Nova de Fronteira, was slowly completed until 1930. In 1930, therefore, the railway already connected Beira, Nhamayabué, Vila Nova de Fronteira, Nsanje, Chiromo and Blantyre, mainly transporting cotton from southern Malawi and from the Sena-Nhamayabué region, in addition to the sugar production by the company Sena Sugar Estates. The permission for the construction of the north-lakes stretch, beyond Blantyre, was later transferred to the company Central African Railways.

In order to cross the Zambezi River and continue the railroad operation, a ferry service was chosen, which paralyzed during the river's drought period. To eliminate the movement of the ferry, Nyasaland Railways Limited (resulting from the merger of the Shire Highlands Railway Company with the Central African Railways) and Trans-Zambezia Railways opted for the construction of the Dona Ana Bridge; the final cost of the bridge was £1.74 million and, for the rest of the 20th century, did not generate enough traffic to pay the interest rate, let alone repay the loans raised to build it.

The extension into Malawian territory towards the north, between Blantyre and Salima, was completed in 1935, reaching the important port of Chipoka, one of the largest on Lake Malawi.

In the 1940s, the Portuguese colonial government for Mozambique built a railway branch linking Dona Ana station, in Nhamayabué, to the coal mines of Moatize. The Dona Ana-Moatize branch line became operational in 1949, with a length of 254 km.

In the 1970s, with Mozambican independence, the extension of the line was agreed, which would depart from Salima towards the west, reaching Lilongwe and Mchinji. The works were completed and inaugurated in 1979.

=== Effects of civil war ===
The Sena railway was the main bulk transport link to Malawi until 1979, when it was destroyed by RENAMO forces in the Mozambican Civil War. As the Sena railway was interconnected with the Nacala railway, at the station in the Malawian city of Nkaya, since 1970, Malawi had its second rail connection with the port of Nacala, in Mozambique. In 1984, the Nacala railway link was also lost, when the Nacala railway was destroyed by RENAMO forces.

=== Attempts to reopen the Blantyre–Nhamayabué section ===
After the signing of the Rome General Peace Accords in 1992, there was an effort to reopen traffic, but devastating floods in 1997 in the valley of the Shire and Ruo rivers destroyed the important Bangula-Chiromo Road-Rail Bridge, connecting the villages of Bangula and Chiromo. The event defined the state of degradation of the line between Blantyre and Nhamayabué. The Bangula-Chiromo bridge was rebuilt in 2003, but the section of the line between Blantyre and Nhamayabué was left behind for being more sinuous and slower, in addition to the low draft and high cargo movement of the port of Beira. Freight was redirected to the Nacala railway. From 1997 to the present (2026) the section between Blantyre (Limbe) and Nhamayabué has been disused. In 2021, the Mozambican government started the rehabilitation of the section connecting Nhamayabué to Marka. However in June 2021 it was reported that the Malawian government had not started work on its section. Some progress was made up to 2025, but then stalled again, and in February 2026 the government pledged to finish the project.

=== The northern extension to Zambia ===
The line from Chipata in Zambia to Mchinji in Malawi was planned in 1982 and completed in 2010, providing Zambia with an alternative access to the sea. Its aim was to provide a freight corridor, in conjunction with road transport, for copper ore exports and general freight imports to and from Nacala, and the export of cement clinker from Lusaka District to Blantyre. The works for this extension were completed in 2010. In 2013 the line was reported as idle because there are few facilities at Chipata. Freight services operated in 2014–2016 but have been idle since, though talks took place in 2025 between Zambia Railways and CFM on restarting.

== Main railway stations ==
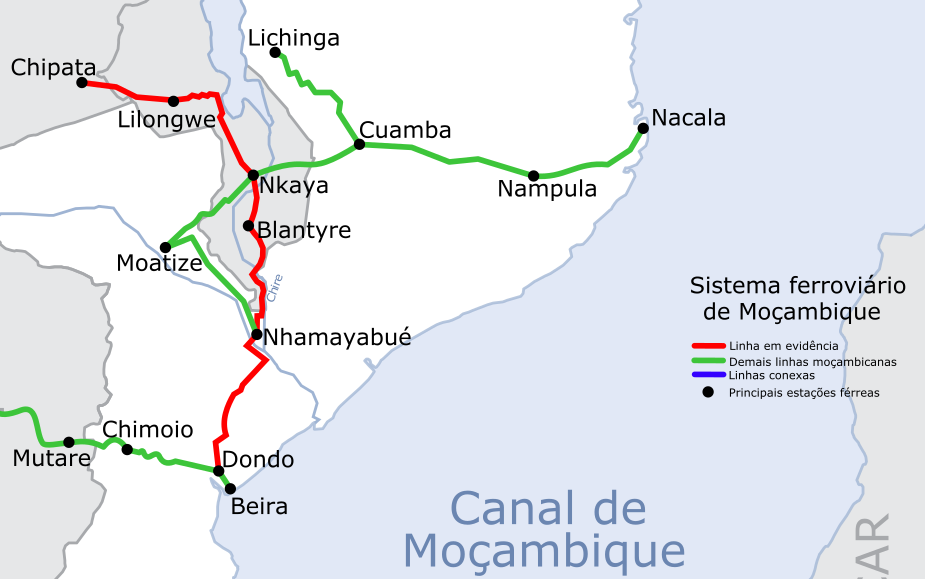
Sena railway map (red line); railways with junction (in green); other railway routes (in blue).

The main railway stations of the Sena railway are:

- Dondo (junction railway station with Machipanda line and Beira)
- Caia
- Sena
- Nhamayabué/Dona Ana Bridge (junction railway station with Moatize branch line)
- Vila Nova de Fronteira
- Marka
- Nsanje (not operational in 2026)
- Bangula (not operational in 2026)
- Luchenza (not operational in 2026)
- Blantyre/Limbe
- Nkaya (junction railway station with Nacala Line)
- Chipoka
- Salima
- Lilongwe
- Mchinji
- Chipata (not operational in 2026)

== Railway branches ==
In 1949, the Dona Ana–Moatize branch line, 254 km long, was definitively opened, connecting the very rich areas of the Benga-Moatize coal belt.

It also has the Inhamitanga–Marromeu branch, which is 88 km long.
