= Sandama =

Human settlement in Malawi

Coordinates: 16°13′00″S 35°17′00″E

Sandama is a small town in south central Malawi. To the immediate east is a border with Mozambique. It is near the Ruo River.

== Transport ==
Sandama is served by a station on the main south line of the national railway system.

== See also ==
- Railway stations in Malawi
