= Zambia Railways =

National railway company of Zambia

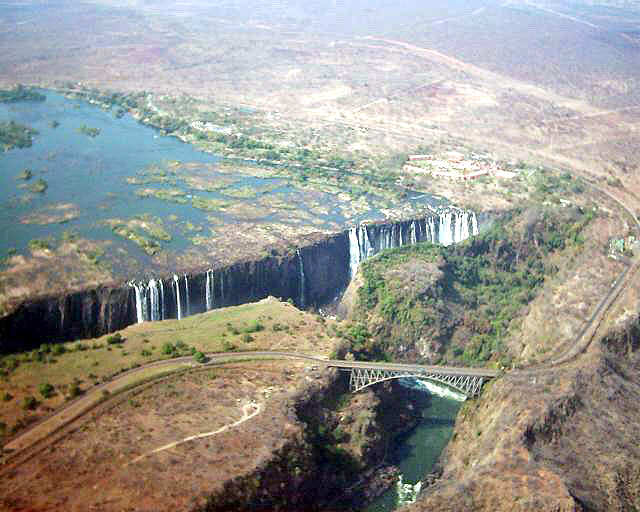
Railway bridge between Zambia and Zimbabwe at Victoria Falls

Zambia Railways (ZR, also known as ZRL) is the national railway company of Zambia and one of the two organisations providing services on the Zambian rail network. The other system is the binational TAZARA Railway (TAZARA) that interconnects with the ZR at Kapiri Mposhi and provides a link to the Tanzanian port of Dar es Salaam.

As of March 2026, Zambia Railways operated passenger trains between Livingstone and Kitwe via Choma, Mazabuka, Lusaka, Kabwe, Kapiri Mposhi, and Ndola. Trains depart on Mondays from Livingstone and arrive on Wednesdays in Kitwe, and depart on Fridays from Kitwe and arrive on Sundays in Liviingstone. Occasional mixed freight and passenger services operate between Livingstone and Mulobezi. Freight services are offerred within Zambia, and between Zambia and DR Congo, Zimbabwe, and Tanzania (via TAZARA).

Zambia Railways has an eastern division with a station at Chipata and a line running to Mchinji in Malawi with connections to the port of Nacala in Mozambique. Limited freight services started in 2014 but ceased in 2016 due to flood damage on the line and have not operated from Chipata since. In April 2025 ZR executives visited Nacala to explore the possibilities for restarting freight services.

== History ==
=== Main line ===
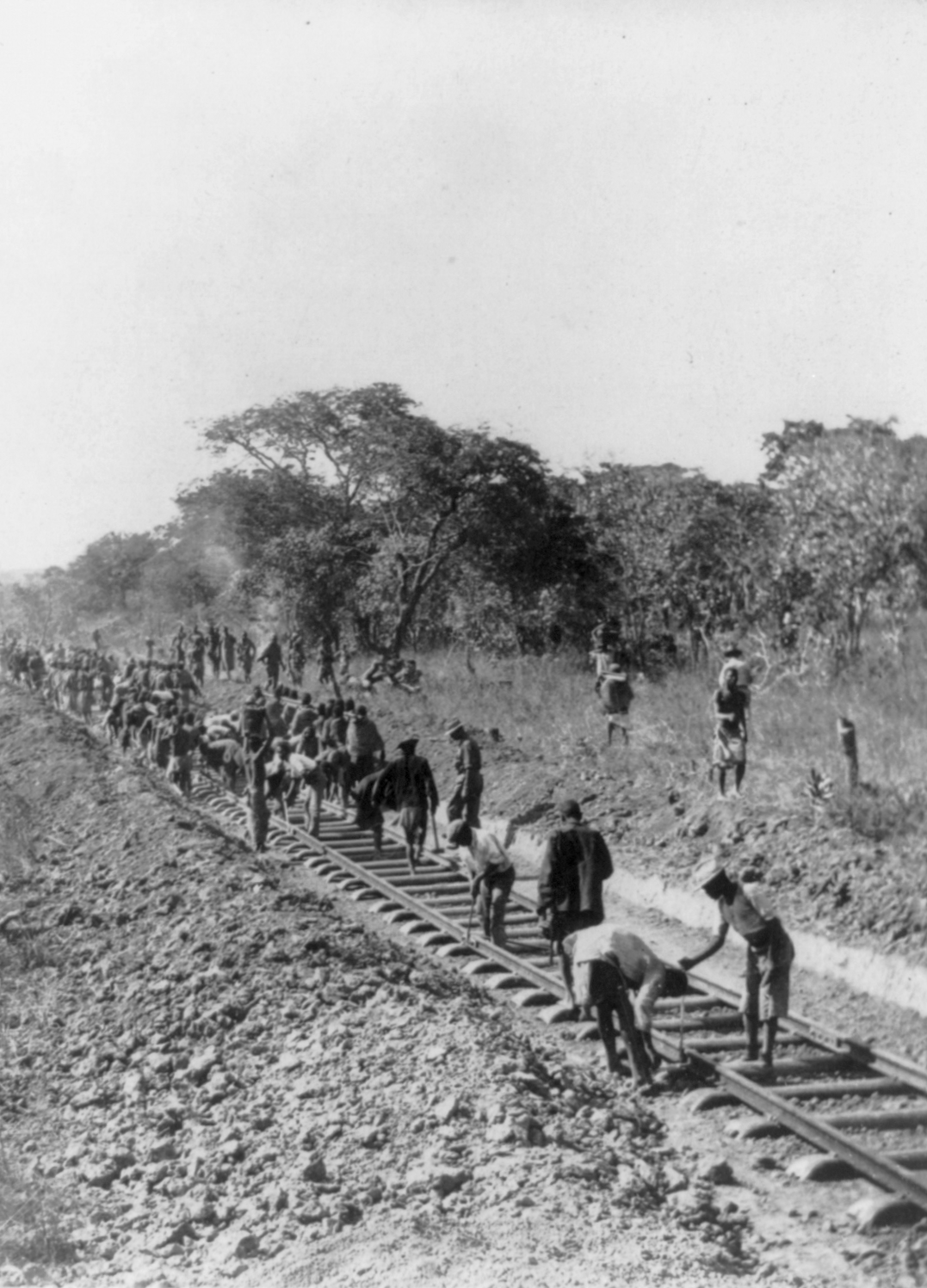
Part of the railway near Kabwe under construction

The 1,067 mm (3 ft 6 in) Cape gauge ZR main line was built during British administration as part of the vision of the Cape-Cairo railway promoted by Cecil Rhodes. His British South Africa Company partnered with a number of railway companies to build the first line north from South Africa, reaching Bulawayo in Southern Rhodesia in 1899. From there it was extended north to the coal mines at Hwange in 1903, which supplied power for the railway.

The economic spur to continue going north was to access the lead and zinc mine of Broken Hill (now Kabwe) and the surface copper mines of Katanga. From Hwange, the railway reached Victoria Falls in 1904, just across the Zambezi from (then) North-Western Rhodesia, part of the future Zambia. However before Victoria Falls Bridge was completed in late 1905, the first railway constructed in Zambia was the 150-km Livingstone-Kalomo line completed in early 1905, with oxen-hauled wagons. Then a single locomotive was conveyed in pieces by cableway across the Zambezi gorge. This enabled trains to operate as far as Kalomo before connection from the main line from the south.

Further construction was carried out by the Mashonaland Railway company, including in 1906 the 427-metre long Kafue Railway Bridge, the longest in the Rhodesias. Kabwe was reached the same year. The line was extended again to Ndola in 1909, crossing the Belgian Congo border at Sakania in 1910, and in the same year the Katange Railway Company line reached Elizabethville (now Lubumbashi), where the first Katangan copper mines opened.

In 1911 North-Western Rhodesia was merged with North-Eastern Rhodesia to form Northern Rhodesia. Lines were extended from Ndola to the Northern Rhodesian Copperbelt mines as underground copper mines opened there from the late 1920s onwards. By this time the railway was called the Beira and Mashonaland and Rhodesia Railway, but from 1927, the name Rhodesia Railways was used.

At the end of 1963 the Federation of Rhodesia and Nyasaland was dissolved pending independence of the three member states from the UK, and federal assets were divided up. Rhodesia Railways was divided between Northern and Southern Rhodesia as a jointly-managed shared asset, and this status continued when Zambia became independent in October 1964. In 1965, Rhodesia Railways in Zambia was the second largest industry in the country after the copper mines. The network north of the Zambezi was just over 1000 km, had 7000 employees with a payroll of nearly £5 million sterling, freight revenue of about £10 million sterling and carried well over 1 million passengers a year.

In 1967, spurred by the Rhodesian UDI crisis, Zambia split its railways off from Rhodesia Railways, and Zambia Railways came into being. It inherited about 80–90 locomotives based at Kabwe, as well as passenger coaches and freight wagons..

=== Mulobezi Railway ===
Zambia Railways operates the Mulobezi Railway, a branch line from Livingstone, built as a private timber line in the 1920s.

=== Njanji Commuter Service/Mulungushi Railway (Lusaka) ===
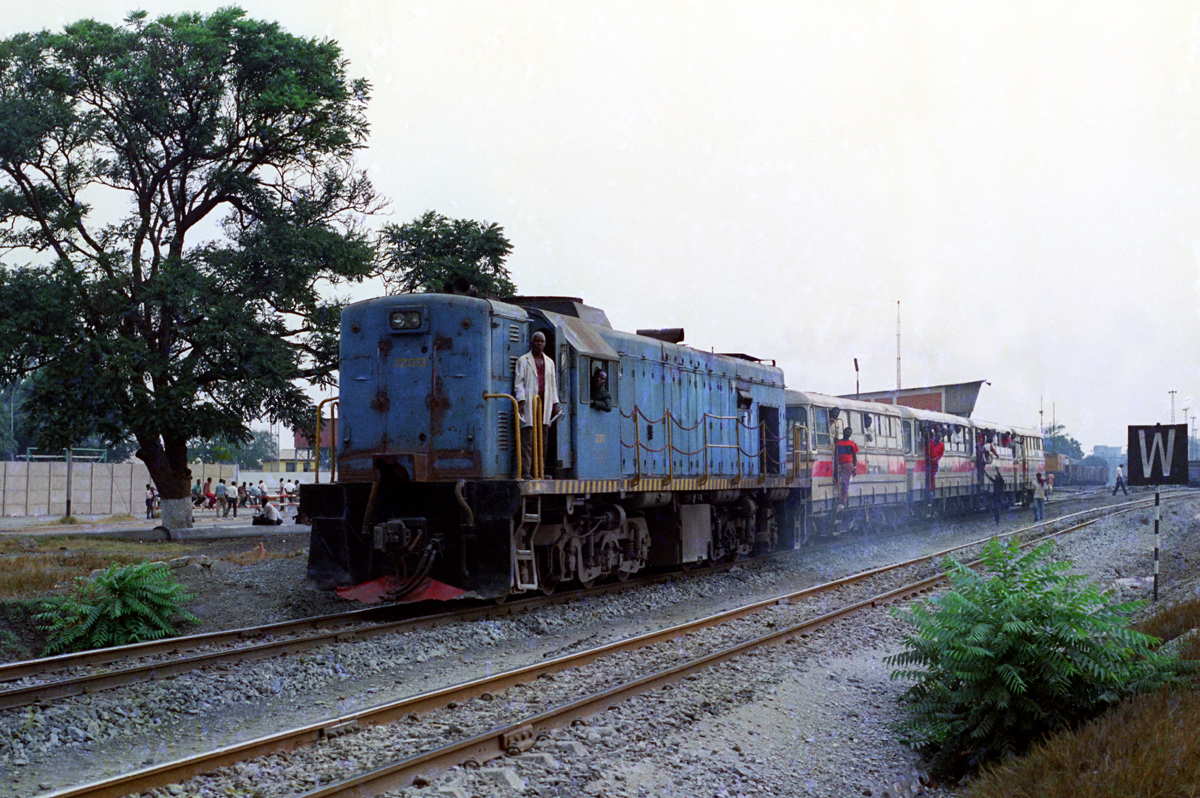
Nkana-Chibuluma miners train at Nkana Mine sidings with the type of coaches used for Njanji Commuter Service in Lusaka

Njanji Commuter Service (NCS), initially called Mulungushi Railway, was a low-cost cape gauge urban railway in Lusaka running about 13 km between Chilenji 15.451°S 28.327°E in the inner south-east and George Township/Industrial area 15.390°S 28.245°E in the inner north-west via the central mainline station. It was built by the then state-owned mining company Zambia Consolidated Copper Mines (ZCCM) for the government, and opened in 1991. The track from Chilenji to the main line was new, the rest used existing lines and freight sidings. ZCCM used the same locomotives and coaches for the line as for their mine worker trains, shown here at the Nkana Mine. The coaches were made locally by attaching Tata bus bodies to mine wagon bases. In 1995 with the privatisation of ZCCM it was transferred to Zambia Railways, which renamed it Njanji Commuter Service.

NCS collapsed in 1998 after only seven years of operation due to the economic climate in Zambia. An era of privatisation began. ZR and NCS could not compete with private buses. As of March 2026 the northwestern freight sidings are mostly still in place, as is the central section of mainline track, but the southeastern section of track has mostly disappeared. Lusaka City Council intended to keep the corridor for a future revival of the line. However a failure to mark it, and lax enforcement of planning laws resulted in some parts of it being built over in Libala and Kabwata. Legal action was taken in 2023 to remove some structures built over it. There have been several proposals to revive ZCS since it closed.

In the mid-2010s the name Njanji Commuter Service was applied to a ZR urban service on the mainline between Lilayi, 7 km south, and Ngwerere, 15 km north of Lusaka Station. The trains used the same rolling stock as the Michael Chilufya Sata Express between Livingstone and Kitwe. However it was reported in 2017 as making losses.

=== Maamba Colliery Railway (branch line) ===
In the 1960s and before, smelting of copper ore in the Copperbelt relied on coal transported by Rhodesia Railways from the Hwange Colliery in (then) Southern Rhodesia. After the Rhodesian Unilateral Declaration of Independence in 1965 newly independent Zambia endeavoured to reduce trade with its ideologically-opposed southern neighbour and in 1968 started to develop the Maamba Colliery about 70 km south of Choma. A branch line was built from Choma to Masuku, 8 km from the colliery, and due to the difficult terrain a material ropeway was constructed to carry the coal from colliery to railhead. By the early 2000s copper smelting in Zambia had declined due to low prices and the remaining production had switched to modern smelting using electricity from Kariba Dam. The colliery fell into disuse and so did the railway branch line and the ropeway. As of 2026 the railway and ropeway remain disused. When the colliery was revived by the construction of Maamba Coal Power Station in the 2010s, a new road was built from Batoka and road transport is now used instead.

== Railway Systems of Zambia ==
Railway Systems of Zambia Limited (RSZ) was a private company incorporated and registered in Zambia. It is a subsidiary of NLPI Ltd, an investment holding company.

The NLPI Consortium participated in a tender in respect of the Zambia Railways Concession. The Consortium was declared the winner with the signing of the Freight Concession Agreement on 14 February 2003.

The Concession was to operate for a period of 20 years with a possible extension for a further 10 years. However, in September 2012, the government revoked the concession and Zambia Railways resumed control.

== International links ==
There are no current international passenger services of the ZR, only of the TAZARA railway.

=== Democratic Republic of the Congo ===
The Copperbelt reaches into the Katanga province of the Democratic Republic of the Congo with mines at Lubumbashi and further north-west. The ZR network connects to Lubumbashi via Ndola and Sakania. Since 1929 the Lubumbashi line connects to the Benguela Railway which goes through Angola to Lobito Bay. The line did not operate from the 1970s until reopening in 2018.

=== TAZARA Railway ===
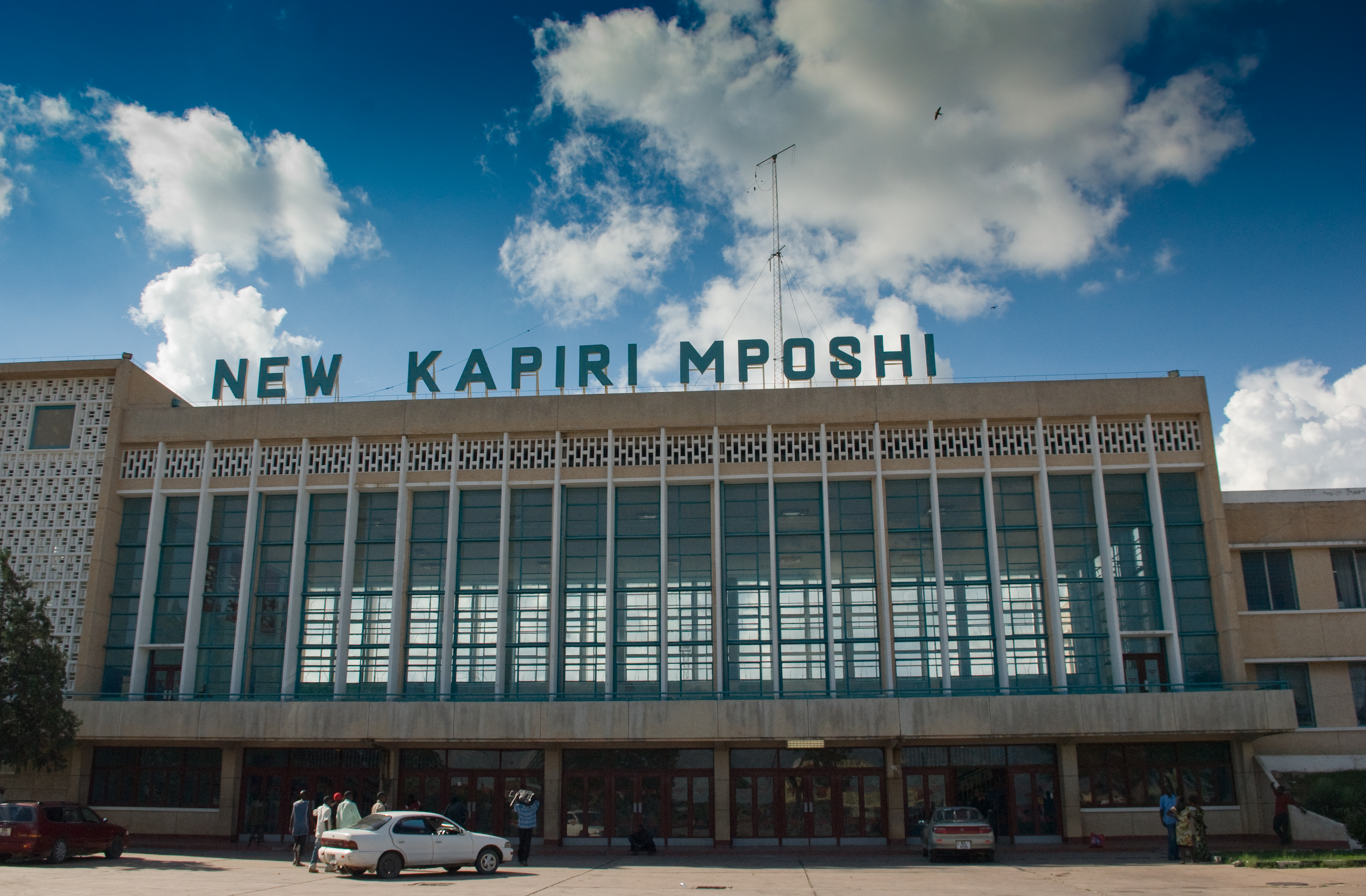
Kapiri Mposhi station

As most of its major export routes ran through then apartheid controlled South Africa, Zambia needed an alternate export route for its copper. In 1976, Chinese construction crews completed the 1,860-kilometer-long Tanzania-Zambia Railway (TAZARA) which runs from Kapiri Mposhi (200 km north of the Zambia capital Lusaka), to the Tanzanian capital and major East African port of Dar es Salaam. After being operated jointly by the two nationalised railway systems, the Chinese again took over the running of TAZARA in a joint transport agreement from January 2007, which covered both direct air links to Beijing Capital International Airport and copper ore export.

=== Zimbabwe and South Africa ===
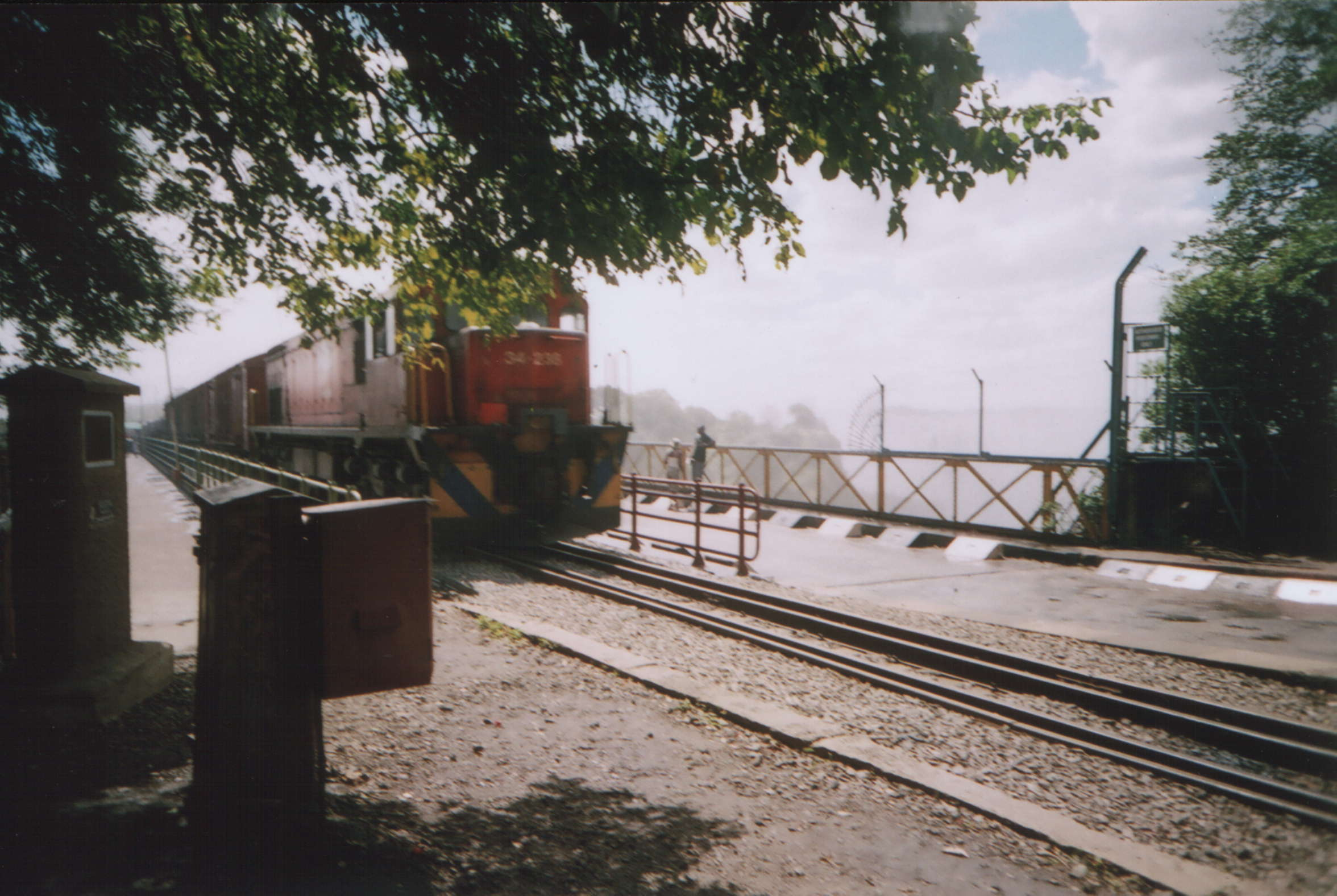
A freight train crossing the Victoria Falls bridge into Zambia from Zimbabwe, 2006

Via Victoria Falls Bridge the Zimbabwe rail network and the ports in Mozambique (Beira, Maputo) and the South African Railways of South Africa can be reached. The condition of the 100-year-old bridge restricts traffic.

Up to the mid-1960s, passenger and sleeper services ran from Ndola to Bulawayo, Zimbabwe (then Rhodesia), connecting with a sleeper service to Cape Town and the Union Castle shipping line to Southampton, UK. This was the main travel route between south-central Africa and Europe before the Jet age. The journey from Ndola to Cape Town took five days.

Ndola-Bulawayo passenger services ended when Zambia suspended all services across the Victoria Falls Bridge in response to Rhodesia's UDI crisis. Freight services were occasionally resumed up to the line re-opening in 1980, but successful passenger services have not resumed.

=== Malawi and Mozambique ===
A rail link from eastern Zambia to the Sena railway between Malawi and Mozambique, allowing access to the port of Nacala, was first planned in 1982. On the Malawi side of the border, the line to Mchinji was finished in 1984, but a connection to Chipata in Zambia was only constructed in 2010. In 2013 the line was reported as idle because there are few facilities at Chipata. Freight services operated in 2014–2016 but have been idle since.

== Maps ==
- UN Map of Zambia

== See also ==
- Rail transport in Zambia
- Railway Systems of Zambia (RSZ)
