= Vila Nova de Fronteira =

- Location within Mozambique
- Coordinates: 17°08′4.366″S 35°11′34.026″E
- Country: Mozambique
- Provinces: Tete Province
- District: Mutarara District

Vila Nova de Fronteira is a Mozambican village in the district of Mutarara, located in the province of Tete. It is located on the Malawi-Mozambique Border, in front of the city of Marka (in Malawi).

In this village is one of the crossing points in the country with permission to grant border visas.

In this location is one of the most important railway stations in the country, which serves the Sena railway, which connects Vila Nova de Fronteira to the city of Marka, in Malawi, and to the Mozambican town of Nhamayabué. There is also the road connection between the N300 (Mozambique) and N1 (Malawi) roads.
