= Dona Ana Bridge =

Railway bridge in Mozambique spanning the Zambezi

Dona Ana Bridge Ponte Dona Ana
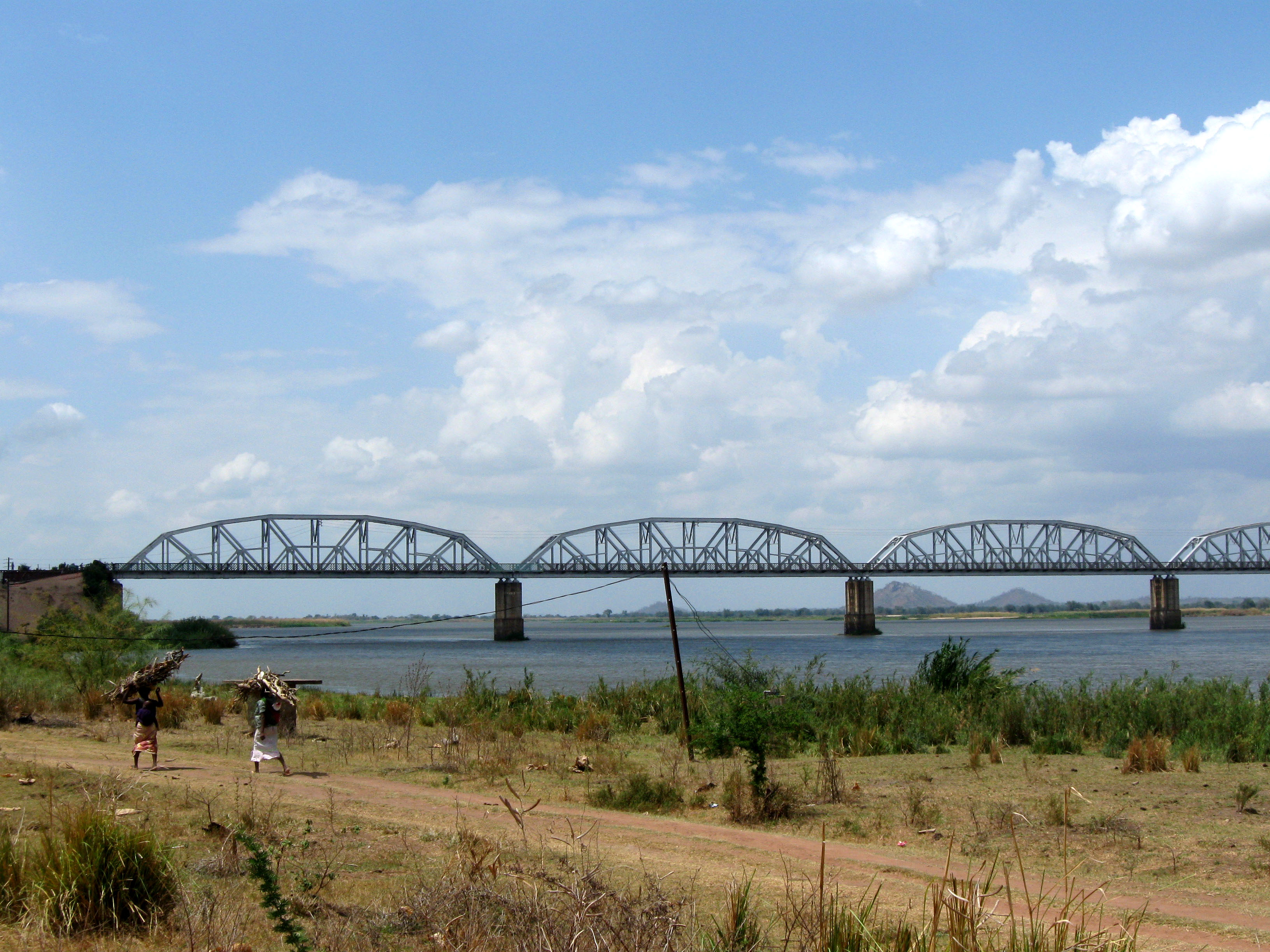
- Coordinates: 17°26′21″S 35°03′41″E
- Carries: Sena railway
- Crosses: Zambezi River
- Locale: Vila de Sena and Mutarara in Mozambique
- Preceded by: Samora Machel Bridge
- Followed by: Armando Emilio Guebuza Bridge

Characteristics
- Total length: 3,670 m (12,040 ft)
- No. of spans: 40

History
- Construction end: 1934

Location
- Interactive map of Dona Ana Bridge

The Dona Ana Bridge spans the lower Zambezi River between the towns of Vila de Sena and Mutarara in Mozambique, effectively linking the two halves of the country. It was originally constructed as a railway bridge to link Malawi and the Moatize coal fields to the port of Beira.

== History ==
The British South Africa Company had a concession from the Portuguese government to build a railway from Dondo, Mozambique on the main railway line from Beira, Mozambique to Rhodesia. In 1912 the Nyasaland government agreed to give financial assistance to British South Africa Company to build the 98-kilometre (61 mi) Central African Railway from Nsanje, the southern terminus of the Shire Highlands Railway to the north bank of the Zambezi at Chindio. This line was completed in 1914 and, at first, river steamers went from Chindio to Chinde on the Indian Ocean. From Chinde, the sea-going lighters continued to Beira, Mozambique. It took two to three weeks to move goods from Blantyre to Beira, involved three transhipments and exposed goods to the risk of water damage.

In 1922, the Trans-Zambezia Railway Company completed a line from Beira to Murracca on the Zambezi, opposite Chindio, so there was an almost-complete rail link from Blantyre to Beira except for the short river crossing by ferry. This was inconvenient because the capacity of the ferry depended on the river depth. For two months in the dry season, the river was low and wet-season floods often washed parts of the track away. In 1927, the British government commissioned a report on building a Zambezi bridge.

The Hammond Report proposed that a Zambezi bridge be built at Mutarara, 40 km (25 mi) upriver of Chindio. The cost of the Zambezi Bridge was estimated at £1.06 million. Eliminating the handling at the ferry and increased traffic were expected to pay the annual interest and create a sinking fund to repay the construction loans. The final cost for the Zambezi Bridge was £1.74 million and it never generated sufficient traffic to pay the interest charge, much less repay the loans raised to build it.

The 3.67-kilometre-long (2 mi 494 yd) Dona Ana Bridge was at that time the longest railway bridge in Africa. The bridge comprises 33 spans of 80 m (260 ft) and 7 spans of 50 m (160 ft). Built by the Portuguese in 1934 during the Portuguese rule of Mozambique, it was rendered unusable in the 1980s, during the Mozambican Civil War. USAID assisted with the repairs and it was converted to a single-lane bridge for vehicle traffic.

Although not located on a primary highway, it provided an alternative route over the Zambezi. The other two options were the bridge at Tete and the former road ferry at Caia which was not always reliable. The Dona Ana Bridge is the longest bridge across the Zambezi and it was the last downstream bridge before the construction of the Armando Emilio Guebuza Bridge in 2009.

The bridge was completely closed to vehicular traffic in October 2006 for rehabilitation and re-conversion to a rail bridge and was reopened as a rail bridge in 2009. In 2017, it underwent renovation, particularly to its pedestrian lane, used by over 3,000 people daily.

== Gallery ==
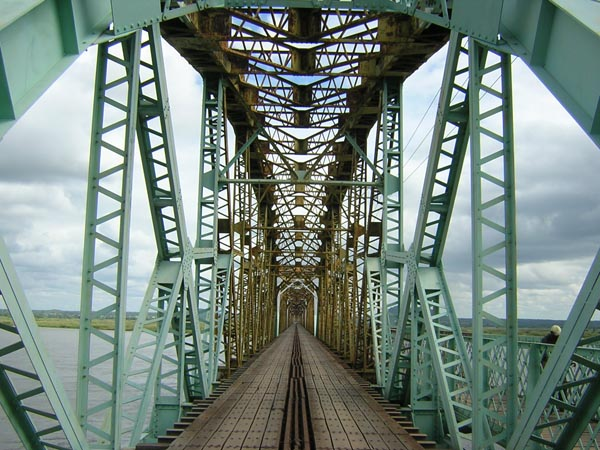

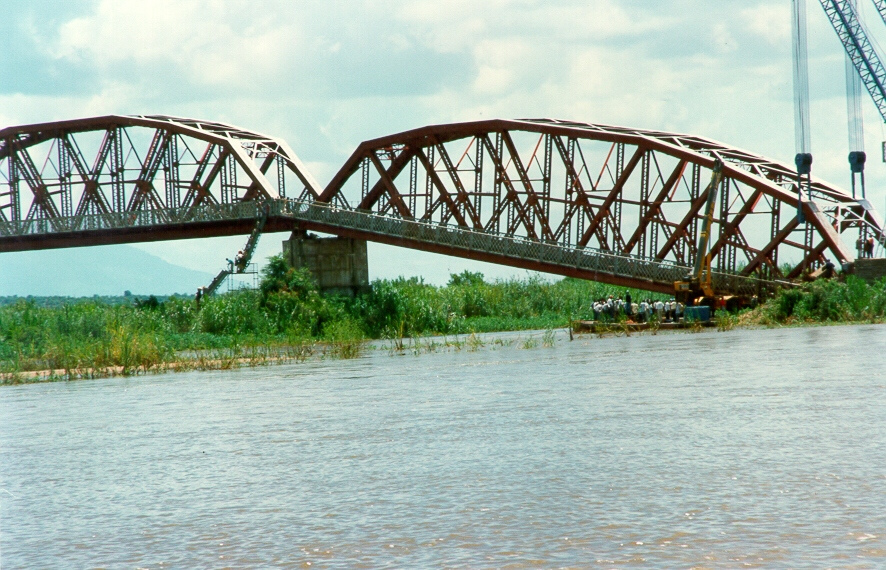
Destroyed by flood waters, 2000

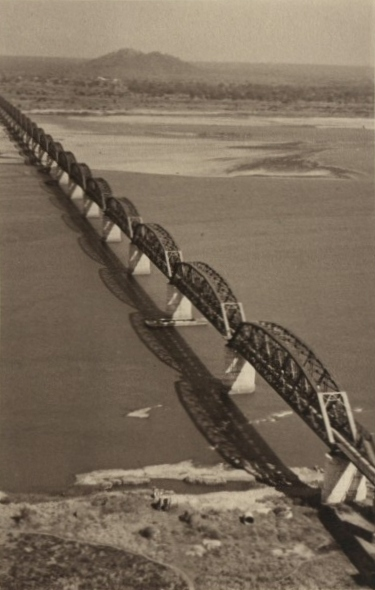
Archives

== See also ==
- List of longest bridges in the world
- List of crossings of the Zambezi River
