= Railway Systems of Zambia =

Railway Systems of Zambia Limited (RSZ) was a private company incorporated and registered in Zambia which operated Zambia Railways from 2003 to 2012. It was a subsidiary of NLPI Ltd, an investment holding company, which main investment is focus on infrastructure-related projects within the continent of Africa.

The shareholders of NLPI are Nedbank Ltd, Old Mutual and Sanlam, all major South African financial institutions, together with New Limpopo Bridge Projects Limited (NLP).

== Zambia railways concession ==
The NLPI Consortium participated in a tender, administered by the World Bank, in respect of the Zambia Railways Concession, in order to ensure a "Through Traffic" pre-arrangement along the Corridor from Durban to Lusaka and beyond. The Consortium was declared the winner with the signing of the Freight Concession Agreement on 14 February 2003, by the Minister of Finance and National Planning of the Republic of Zambia, as well as representatives of the NLPI Consortium.

The Consortium made a provision of US$40 million for the rehabilitation of Zambia Railways. The World Bank funded an additional investment of approximately US$30 million to finance Zambia Railways staff retrenchment packages, locomotive rehabilitation and other related projects.

Zambia Railways, which comprises over 900 kilometres of mainline railways and 300 kilometres of branch line railway, is one of the largest rail networks within the region.

The Zambia Concession, which covered the entire network from the Sakania Border to Victoria Falls, including the Copperbelt and other branch lines, not only constituted one of the largest ever acquisitions in Zambia's history, but was also unique, as it was Zambia's first railway concession.

The Government of the Republic of Zambia terminated the concession contract on 11 September 2012, but RSZ disputed the grounds for termination.

== See also ==
- Rail transport in Zambia
- Transport in Zambia
