= Dondo, Mozambique =

Dondo
- Location within Mozambique
- Coordinates: 19°37′S 34°45′E
- Country: Mozambique
- Provinces: Sofala Province
- District: Dondo District

Population (2007 census)
  - Total: 70,817

Dondo is a city and district Dondo District of Sofala Province in Mozambique.

== Industry ==
Dondo has a cement works which used limestone mined at Muanza.

Dondo has one of two concrete sleeper plants, the other being at Vila de Sena.

== Transport ==
Dondo has a station on the Mozambican rail network, where the line to Malawi and Moatize junctions from the line to Zimbabwe.

== Demographics ==
Year	Population
1997	63,757
2008	77,532

== See also ==
- Transport in Mozambique
- Railway stations in Mozambique
