= Vila de Sena =

Coordinates: 17°26′30″S 35°01′38″E

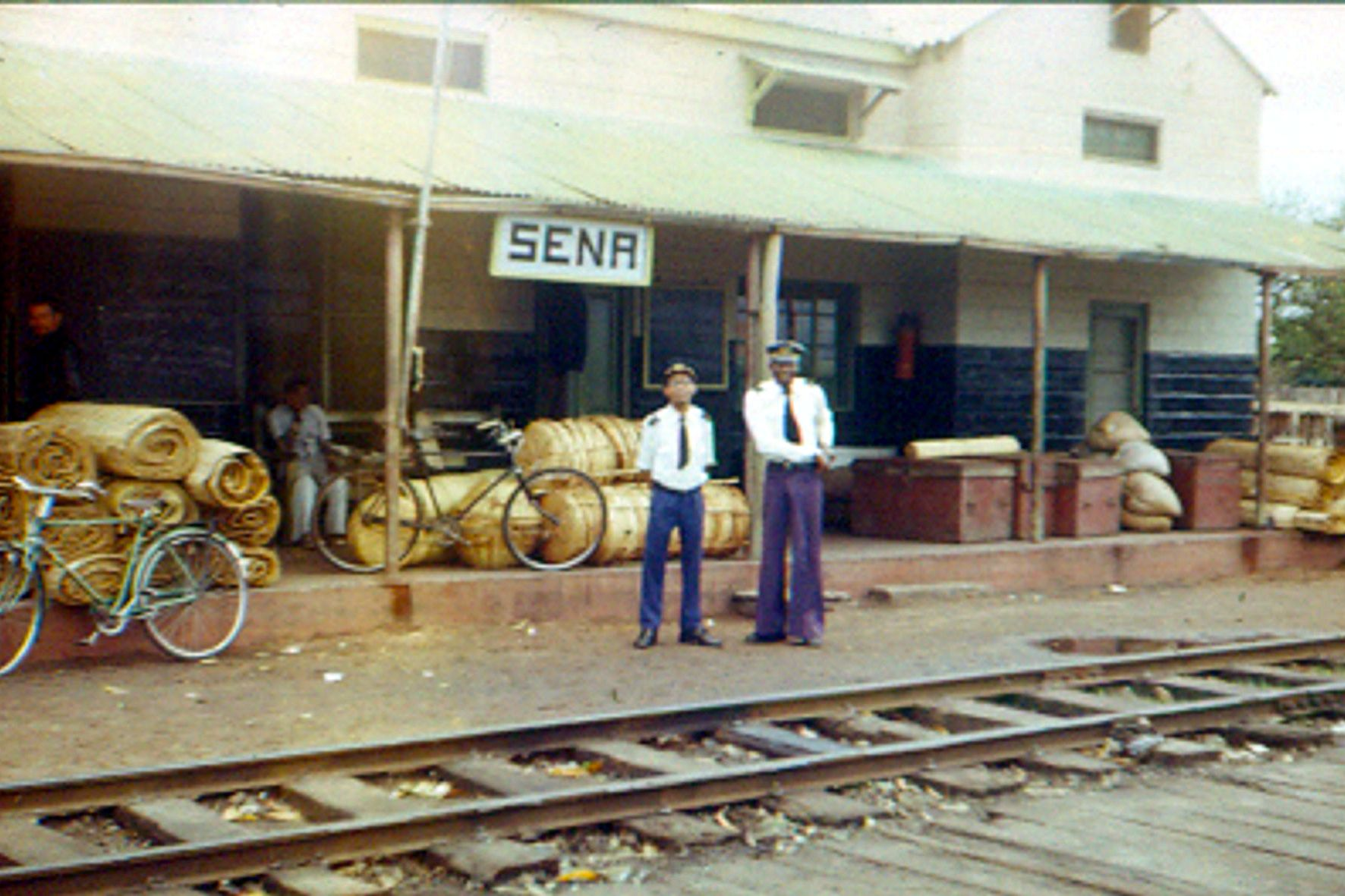
Train station of Sena

Vila de Sena or more commonly Sena is a town in Mozambique where there is a fundamental bridge over the Zambezi River. This bridge, the Dona Ana Bridge was originally a single track railway bridge, temporarily converted to road operation during the civil war.

The town lies on the east bank of the river.

== History ==
Sena was used as a trading outpost by Swahili Muslims, bringing in Indian Ocean luxuries to Great Zimbabwe and Mutapa Empire in exchange for gold. In the early 1500s the Portuguese took over the region, but Swahili traders were still present for the next few decades. In 1568 after Muslims convinced the Mutapa king to kill Gonçalo da Silveira the Portuguese launched a large eradicated the Swahili presence along the Zambezi. Portuguese settlers and traders then replaced the Muslims.

Though even as late as 1750s, the lieutenant-general of the Rivers complained bitterly that Muslim traders from Sanculo, a small polity on the mainland just south of Mozambique Island, were zealously preaching Islam among the Africans around Murambala, north of the Zambezi and east of the Shire rivers from Sena.

== Transport ==
The Sena railway has a junction at this station. The railway is not operational; it is in very poor condition, and reconstruction work has been delayed.

In 2008, a factory for making concrete sleepers was established here.

The railway has a siding for passing trains but no junction. The line is operational with its main use transportation coal to the port of Beira from Moatize in Tete Province. A passenger and general goods train operated by CFM travels three to four times a week from Beira.

== See also ==
- Railway stations in Mozambique
- Transport in Mozambique
