= Mchinji =

- Location in Malawi
- Coordinates: 13°49′S 32°54′E
- Country: Malawi
- Region: Central Region
- District: Mchinji District
- Elevation: 1,181 m (3,875 ft)

Population (2018 Census)
  - Total: 28,011
  - Languages: Chewa; Sena; Tumbuka; Lomwe
- Time zone: +2
- Climate: Cwa

Mchinji is a town and the capital of the Mchinji District in the Central Region of Malawi. Mchinji Boma, located 12 kilometres (7 1/2 mi) from the Zambian border and 109 km (68 mi) from the national capital, Lilongwe, is the major hub of government and general business. The area's economy is sustained by rain-fed agriculture.

== History ==
Mchinji Boma was formerly known as Fort Manning, after governor William Manning. Fort Manning was called a "fort" because the local government offices (the "boma") were once fortified.

In 1930, Fort Manning was attacked by a lion that caused over thirty-six deaths over a five-month period.

A magnitude 6.6 earthquake struck Mchinji on 10 March 1989. At least 9 people were killed, 100 injured and about 50,000 left homeless in Malawi. It was also felt in Zambia.

American pop singer Madonna adopted 13-month-old David Banda from Mchinji in October 2006. This generated international controversy because Malawian law stated that one year of residence was required of potential adoptive parents. The effort was highly publicised and culminated in legal disputes.

On 19 June 2008 Gillian Merron, the British Minister for International Development, responsible for Africa, visited Mchinji and spoke about maternal health and the challenges faced by residents.

== Geography ==
Mchinji Boma lies at an elevation of 1,182 metres (3,877 ft), 12 kilometres (7.5 mi) from the Zambian border. It is situated 12.4 km (7.7 mi) away from Katambo, 3.5 km (2.2 mi) away from Kadulama Lambo, 2.3 km (1.4 mi) away from Daka and 4.5 km (2.8 mi) away from Tsumba.

== Demographics ==
=== Population development ===
Year	Population
1977	1,962
1987	4,921
1998	11,408
2008	17,881
2018	28,011

=== Languages ===
Chichewa is the main language spoken in Mchinji. Senga is spoken by some quarters of the population and Ngoni is also spoken by some major population surrounding Mchinji Boma

== Economy ==
Mchinji is described as "dirt poor" by The Times. Harvesting rain-fed agriculture is the main occupation in Mchinji, with groundnuts, tobacco, soya and casava beans being the primary cash crops. Maize, yams, velvet beans and pumpkin are prominent food crops. During the dry season, secondary activities are pursued, such as brick-making, beer brewing, bicycle repair and carpentry. Due to a food shortage partially caused by the region's many droughts and partially caused by poor government planning, a UNDP rural development program was established in Mchinji. Mchinji is currently the location of a pilot project of a social cash transfer to benefit very poor members of rural areas.

== Politics And Traditional Authority Areas ==
There are 10 Traditional Authorities namely; Mkanda, Mavwere, Zulu, Mlonyeni, Pitala, Simphasi, Dambe, Kapondo, Mduwa, Mponda and Nyoka.

The Members for the Malawian National Assembly are six in total. They are for Honorable Kayo Zimchetera East Constituency (in Traditional Authorities Mduwa, Mponda and Nyoka), Honorable Rachel Zulu Mazombwe for Mchinji North Constituency (in Traditional Authorities Mkanda and Pitala), Honorable Alex Chitete for Mchinji North East Constituency (in Traditional Authorities Kapondo and Dambe), Honorable Jerome Waluza for Mchinji South Constituency (in Traditional Authority Mavwere), Honorable Mussa Banda for Mchinji South West Constituency (in Traditional authority Mlonyeni), and Honorable Teleza Mwale for Mchinji West Constituency (in Traditional Authorities Zulu and Simphasi). The members are from the Peoples Party, Malawi Congress Party and Democrat Progressive Party.

Local politician Agnes Nkusa Nkhoma was elected in 2019 for the south constituency (Mabvere) after obtaining 5,000 votes. She had unsuccessfully stood in 2009. She would become a deputy minister. She was supported by the Malawi Congress Party.

=== Orphanage ===
The Mchinji Mission Orphanage, popularly known as the "Home of Hope", is one of the largest children's homes in Malawi. Reverend Thomson Chipeta, remembering losing both his parents, brought orphaned children into his home in 1992 and construction of an orphanage began in 1998. As of 2007, there are six large residential houses, a dining/assembly hall, a clinic, classrooms for nursery, primary and secondary classes, and staff housing. "Baby David" lived in the orphanage prior to being adopted by Madonna. The children are divided into different houses and each house has its own 'amayi'. An amayi acts as the house mother for the children. Each morning all the children must attend a daily devotion, in which there will be much singing and praying. Following the devotion ceremony the children will all line up outside the 'kitchen' where they will get nsima for their breakfast. Nsima, maize and beans is typically what they will eat for every meal. Not all children living at the orphanage are 'orphans', many still have family however they are unable to provide basic necessities so they send them to Home of Hope. During summer vacation and other holidays many of the children will return to their villages to spend time with their family.

=== Education ===
The "Home of Hope" provides a primary school to its residents. Due to a shortage in secondary schools in Malawi, the orphanage built one in January 2006 to cater to all residents in the surrounding area. Children are taught in smaller groups than at government schools and have November and December off. In March 2007, the United States Agency for International Development (USAID) donated 600 textbooks to that secondary school. In 2014, American charitable organisation Youth of Malawi, Inc. built a solar-rain water harvesting primary school in Chimphamba Village, Mchinji, for 180 first and second graders.

Ludzi Girls' Secondary School is in Mchinji.

=== Religion ===
Roman Catholic is dominant in the district with Parishes such as Guilime, Ludzi, Kapiri, Kamangilira, Kachebere, Mkanda and Mchinji Boma. It has a Major Catholic Seminary Called KACHEBERE. Other churches are Presbyterian, Pentecostal and few Muslims.

=== Medical ===
Mchinji Hospital is the only medical facility for several miles. According to actress Claire Sweeney, mothers "only come here if their children are really sick because work on the farm nearly always comes first." As of 2008, the children's ward of the hospital contains 185 children suffering from malaria, pneumonia or anaemia. Patients at the hospital are fed a blend of milk, protein and medicine. The hospital does not have beds for those accompanying the sick, cooking or washing facilities, although in early 2008 a brick shelter was created to protect parents from nature.

== Transport ==
Mchinji was previously the railhead nearest the Zambian border, after the 920-kilometre (570 mi) railway from Lilongwe was extended to Mchinji in 1980. In September 2010, an extension of the Sena railway was opened to the border town of Chipata, providing a new rail access point to Zambia via Mchinji. The idea of a Mchinji-Chipata railway was conceived in 1982 as part of a bilateral project between Zambia and Malawi, and the Malawi section of the railroad was completed in 1984, though Zambia did not start construction of its part of the line until 2006. Although completed in 2010, the line and Chipata Station had not been used, as of 2025.

Minibuses run from Mchinji to Lilongwe, and local shared taxis can be taken from Mchingi to the Zambian border. A water transport system existed from Lilongwe to Mchinji, though Bakili Muluzi favoured road transport and the system was dropped. The nearest airport is at Lilongwe, 76 km (47 mi) away, although there is a closer airstrip at Chipata.

As of May 2020, the Malawi Revenue Authority indicated that the one-stop-border post (OSP), under construction at Mchinji would be completed by December 2020. The OSP will benefit Mwami, Zambia and Mchinji, Malawi crossings. It was built with US$5.8 million, borrowed from the African Development Bank.
