= Mutarara =

Town in Mozambique

- Town
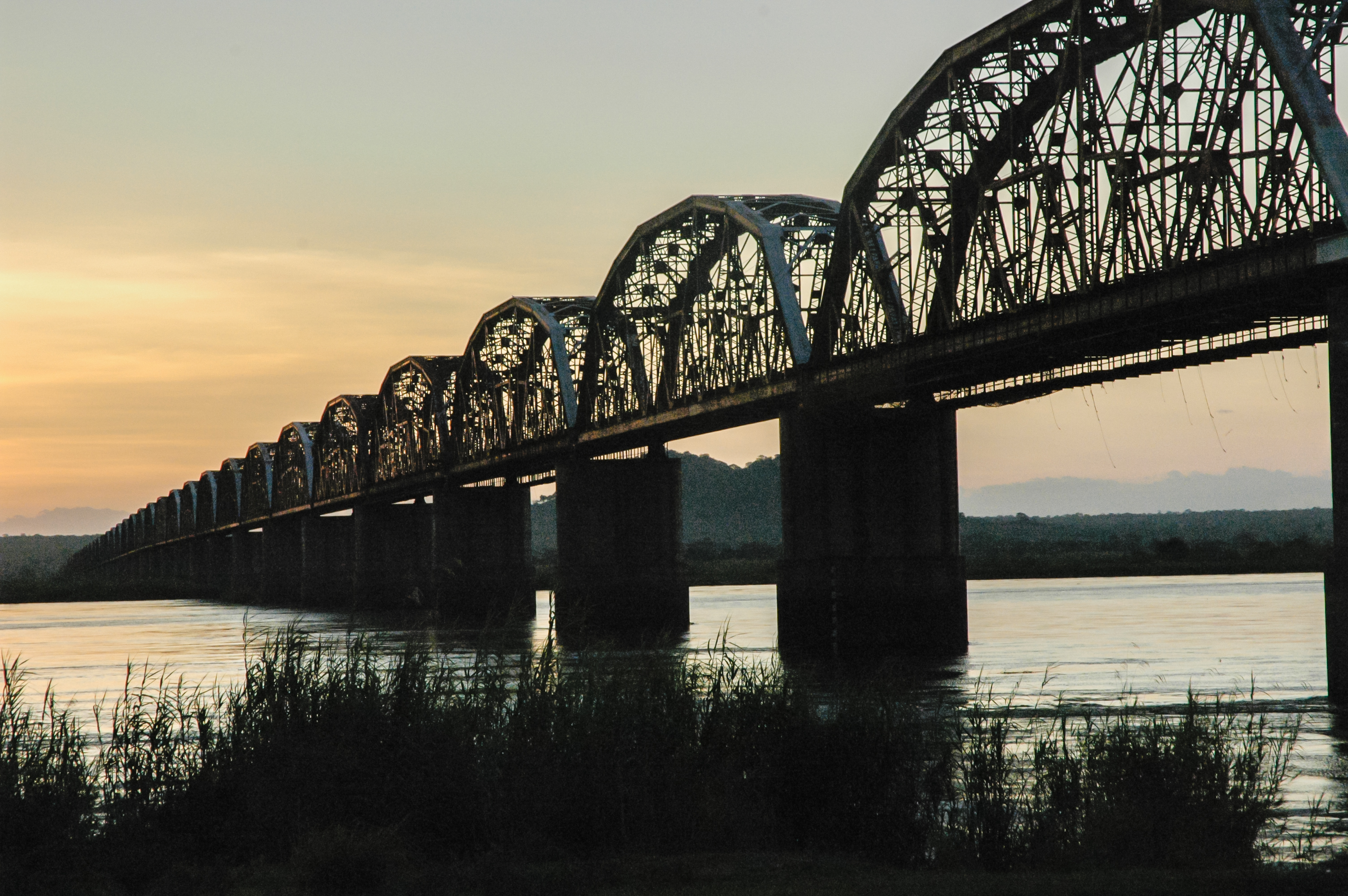
- The Dona Ana railway bridge on Mutarara's south end

- Location within Mozambique
- Coordinates: 17°26′24″S 35°04′26″E
- Country: Mozambique
- Province: Tete
- Time zone: UTC+2:00 (CAT)

Mutarara, or Nhamayabué, is a town in Mozambique. It lies on the north bank of the Zambezi River.

== Transport ==
Mutarara is served by a station on the Sena railway of Mozambique Ports and Railways. It is the junction for the line to Malawi. It also lies on the north end of the Dona Ana railway bridge over the Zambezi River.

== See also ==
- Railway stations in Mozambique
