= Salima, Malawi =

Salima
- Location in Malawi
- Coordinates: 13°47′S 34°26′E
- Country: Malawi
- Region: Central Region
- District: Salima District
- Elevation: 538 m (1,765 ft)

Population (2018 Census)
  - Total: 36,789
- Time zone: +2
- Climate: Aw

Salima is a township in the Central Region of Malawi and the capital of the Salima District.

== Transport ==
The city has a railway station on the Sena railway, under concession of Central East African Railways.

Taxi bicycles, called "Dampa/kabaza" in the local language, are the most common mode of transport in the district.

== Climate ==
Climate data for Salima (1961–1990)
Month	Jan	Feb	Mar	Apr	May	Jun	Jul	Aug	Sep	Oct	Nov	Dec	Year
Mean daily maximum °C (°F)	29.4 (84.9)	29.0 (84.2)	29.5 (85.1)	28.9 (84.0)	27.8 (82.0)	26.2 (79.2)	25.9 (78.6)	27.8 (82.0)	30.6 (87.1)	32.5 (90.5)	32.2 (90.0)	30.3 (86.5)	29.2 (84.6)
Daily mean °C (°F)	24.8 (76.6)	24.7 (76.5)	25.0 (77.0)	24.8 (76.6)	22.5 (72.5)	20.7 (69.3)	20.7 (69.3)	21.9 (71.4)	24.1 (75.4)	26.4 (79.5)	26.9 (80.4)	25.6 (78.1)	24.0 (75.2)
Mean daily minimum °C (°F)	21.4 (70.5)	21.3 (70.3)	21.4 (70.5)	20.7 (69.3)	17.9 (64.2)	15.9 (60.6)	15.8 (60.4)	16.9 (62.4)	18.7 (65.7)	21.3 (70.3)	22.3 (72.1)	22.2 (72.0)	19.6 (67.3)
Average precipitation mm (inches)	339.4 (13.36)	266.4 (10.49)	254.4 (10.02)	92.5 (3.64)	10.7 (0.42)	2.0 (0.08)	0.4 (0.02)	0.4 (0.02)	0.3 (0.01)	6.4 (0.25)	43.6 (1.72)	250.0 (9.84)	1,266.5 (49.86)
Average precipitation days (≥ 0.3 mm)	18	16	14	7	2	1	1	1	1	2	5	14	82
Average relative humidity (%)	80	82	77	73	68	63	61	57	55	54	61	75	67
Mean monthly sunshine hours	182.9	173.6	229.4	261.0	294.5	279.0	275.9	300.7	300.0	310.0	270.0	207.7	3,084.7
Mean daily sunshine hours	5.9	6.2	7.4	8.7	9.5	9.3	8.9	9.7	10.0	10.0	9.0	6.7	8.4
Source: NOAA

== Demographics ==
Year	Population
1977	4,646
1987	10,606
1998	20,355
2008	27,852
2018	36,789
