= Ruo River =

Ruo River Rio Ruo
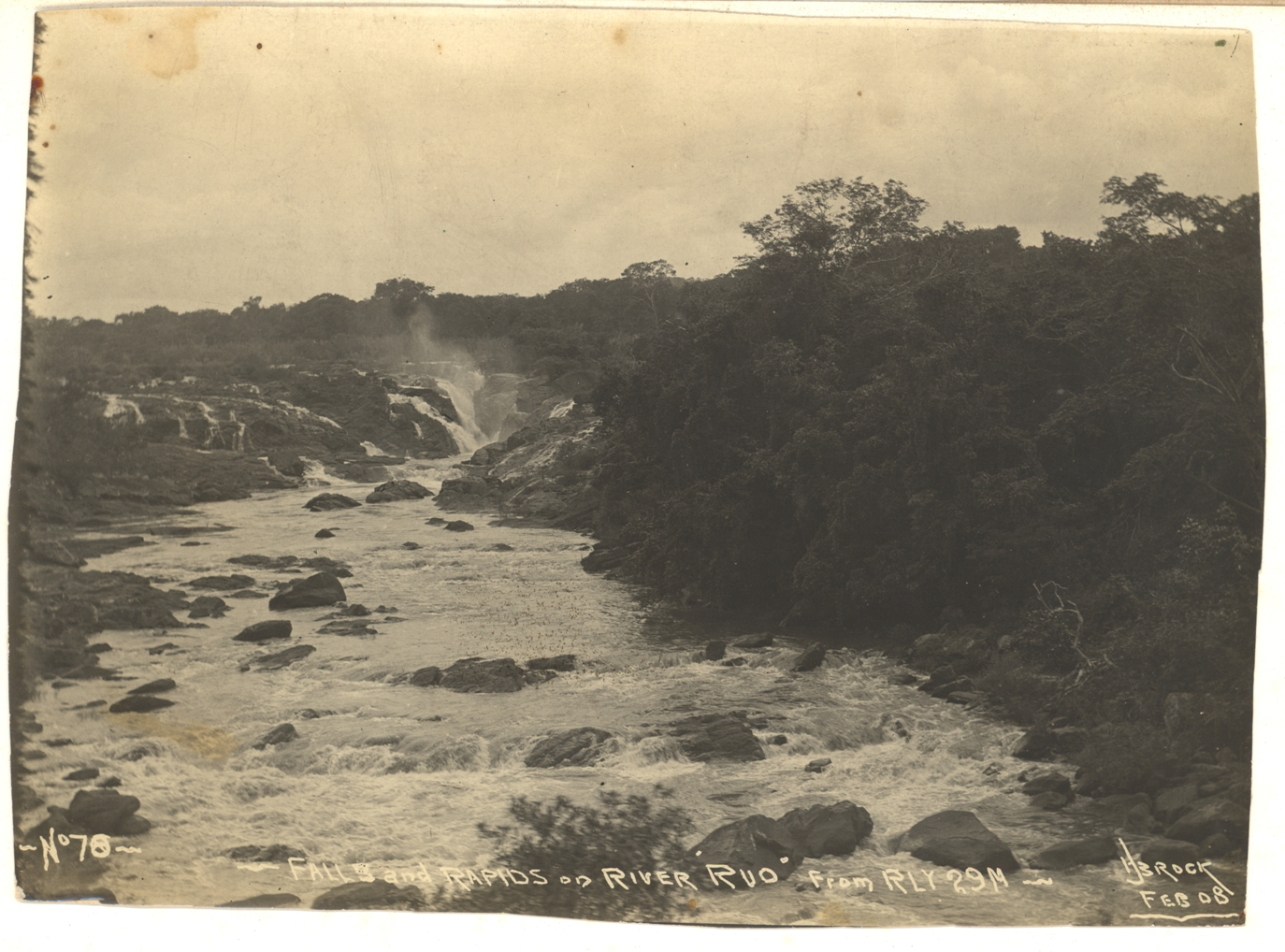

- Location of the confluence with the Shire River in Chiromo, Malawi

Location
- Countries: Malawi, Mozambique

Physical characteristics
- Source: Mulanje Massif, Malawi
  - coordinates: 15°56′59″S 35°35′37″E
- Mouth: Chiromo, Malawi
  - location: Shire River
  - coordinates: 16°33′00″S 35°08′00″E
- Basin size: 4,900 km^{2} (1,900 mi^{2})

Basin features
- River system: Zambezi
- Waterfalls: Zoa Falls

Ruo River is the largest tributary of the Shire River in southern Malawi and Mozambique. It originates from the Mulanje Massif (Malawi) and forms 80 km (50 mi) of the Malawi-Mozambique border. It joins the Shire River at Chiromo.

The Ruo River watershed includes the southern slopes of the Mulanje Massif and Shire Highlands in Malawi. Its principal tributary is the Thuchila (or Tuchila) River, which drains the southwestern slopes of Mulanje and the southeastern slopes of the Shire Highlands and the Thuchila plain between them. The confluence of the Ruo and Thuchila is near Sandama. The Ruo and its left bank tributaries also drain a portion of Milange District in neighboring Mozambique.

Zoa Falls (16°18'27"S 35°17'10"E) has a 60-meter drop, and effectively isolates the fish populations upstream in the Ruo watershed from those of the lower Zambezi and Shire rivers.

The Shire Highlands Railway follows the lower course of the Ruo between Sandama and Chiromo.

== Ruo River screeching frog ==
Frog Arthroleptis francei was first collected from near the Ruo River on the slopes of the Mulanje Massif. One of its common names is Ruo River screeching frog. Its other common name, France's squeaker, as well as its specific name francei carry a tragic history. Mr. F. H. France was a young forestry officer who perished in trying to cross the Ruo River close to where Arthroleptis francei were first collected. Arthur Loveridge, the scientist who described the species, named it after France so that "his name may be linked with the forests he sought to preserve on the mountain he loved so well." Despite its connection with river though its history and naming, this frog is a terrestrial species living in leaf litter.
