= Nsanje =

- City
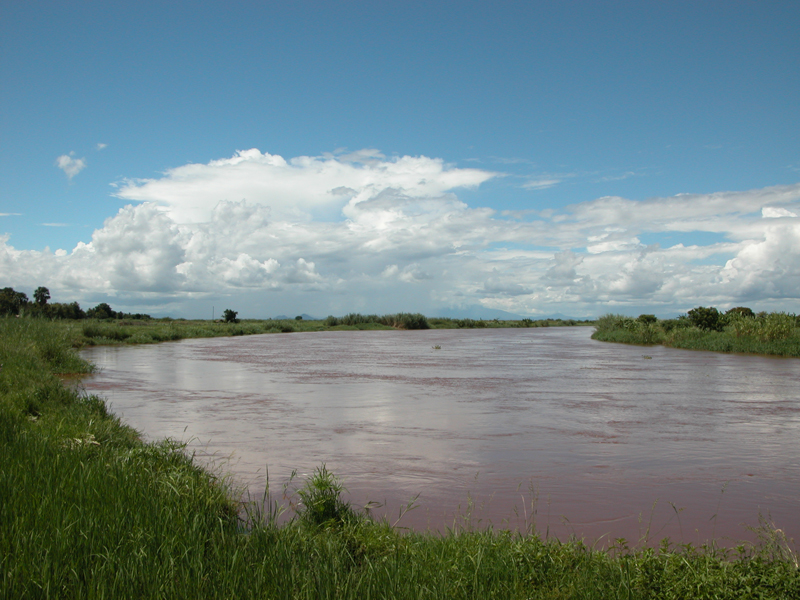

- Location in Malawi
- Coordinates: 16°55′00″S 35°16′00″E
- Country: Malawi
- Region: Southern Region
- District: Nsanje District

Population (2018 Census)
  - Total: 26,844
- Time zone: +2
- Climate: Aw

Nsanje (formerly Port Herald) is the main city in Nsanje District within the Southern Region of Malawi.

The intense urbanization in the fertile Shire River valley has formed an extensive urbanized zone that runs from the city of Bangula, further north, passing through the city of Nsanje, in the center, and arriving in the city of Marka, in the south, even crossing the Mozambican border, covering the town of Vila Nova de Fronteira.

== Transport ==
The city has a railway station on the Sena railway, under concession of Central East African Railways. The railway through Nsanje that connects Blantyre with Beira, Mozambique was severely disrupted by the Mozambique Civil War and remains closed. The main road north connecting the city to the rest of Malawi is being upgraded.

== Shipping ==
A project is currently underway to dredge part of the Shire River in order to make sea transport to Malawi viable. The Shire merges with the Zambezi River, near Caia, Mozambique, and the Zambezi then flows into the Indian Ocean. As of September, 2010, some of the main concrete work on the jetty was complete and the port was officially declared open in a ceremony attended by President Bingu wa Mutharika of Malawi and President Robert Mugabe of Zimbabwe. However, by August 2016 the port was still incomplete and unused, despite a feasibility study with positive results concluded a few months earlier, and talks were being held on restarting the project.

== Notable people ==
The deputy minister of health Halima Daud was born here.

== Climate ==
Nsanje lies only about 46 meters above sea level. During the summer months, daytime highs can exceed 120 °F (49 °C).

== Demographics ==
Year	Population
1977	6,091
1987	11,009
1998	16,987
2008	20,179
2018	26,844
