= Chiromo =

Town in Malawi

Coordinates: 16°33′00″S 35°08′00″E

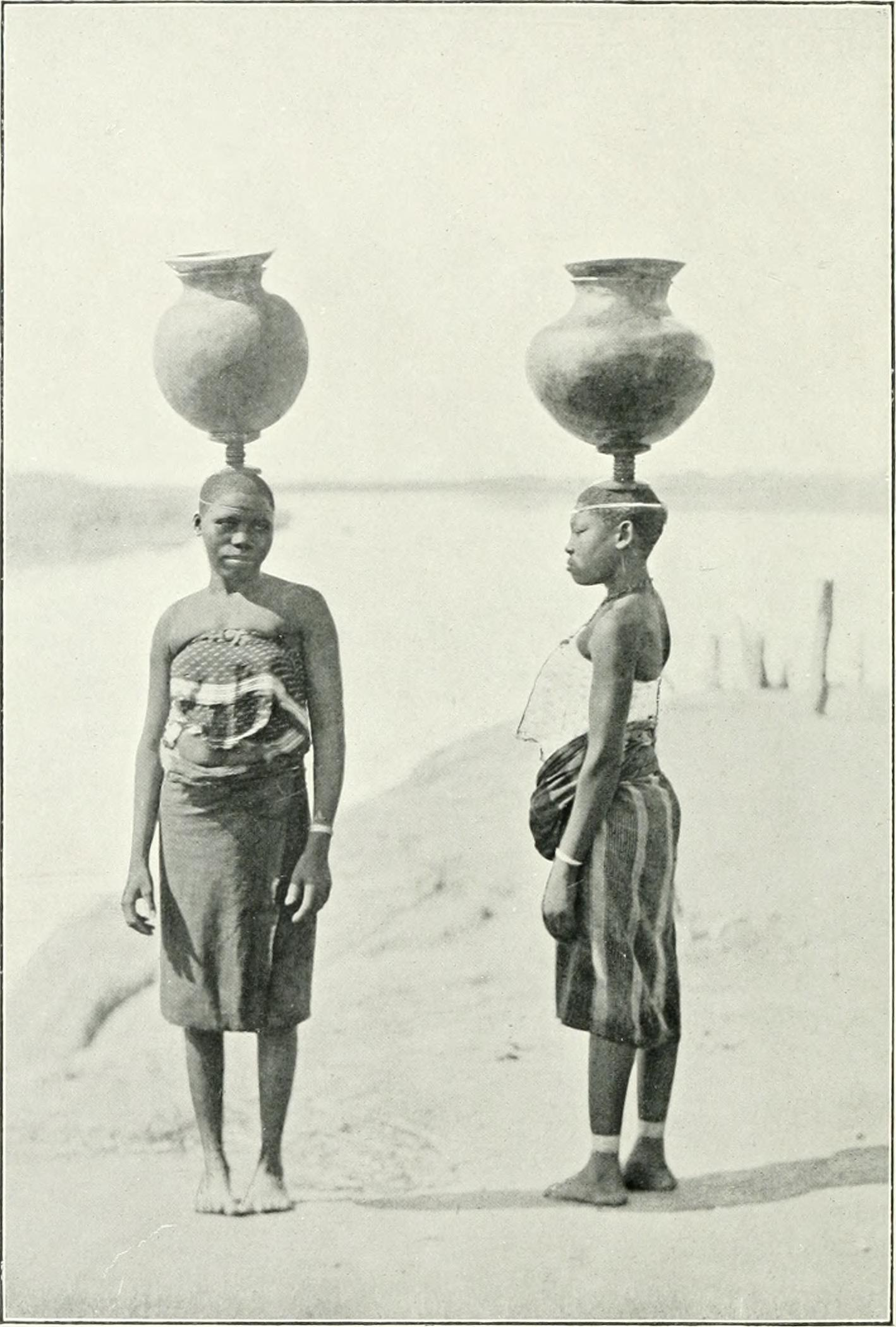
Women of Chiromo (1906)

Chiromo is a town in southern Malawi by the Shire River.

== Name ==
The Nairobi suburb of Chiromo near Westlands, as well as University of Nairobi Chiromo Campus and Nairobi's Chiromo Road got their name from this town. Ewart Grogan saw the two rivers that met in that Nairobi area reminding him of the village in southern Malawi and named the place Chiromo. Chiromo means “joining of the streams”.

== Transport ==
It is served by a Station on the national railway system, the railway line extends to Blantyre.

It was for many years the heart of the cotton industry and had one of the best bridges in Africa at the time. The bridge suffered a severe washaway in 1997 which further reduced what had been part of the strategic Sena Railway line to Beira in Mozambique. The line through Mozambique was not repaired until 2024 when the first train of oil for 41 years arrived in Marka. There is a promise that Malawian section will also be repaired but until then oil can travel by road to Blantyre.

== See also ==
- Railway stations in Malawi
