= Native Authority =

Since 1933, various traditional chiefs in Nyasaland have been designated as Native Authorities, initially by the colonial administration, and they numbered 105 in 1949. They represented a form of the indirect rule which had become popular in British African dependencies in the second quarter of the 20th century, although Nyasaland's Native Authorities had fewer powers and smaller incomes than similar institutions in other African colonies. The Native Authority system worked reasonably effectively until after the Second World War, when they were obliged to enforce unpopular government agricultural policies and, in some cases, their support for the Federation of Rhodesia and Nyasaland made Native Authorities unpopular with many of their people. After 1953, many of the powers of individual chiefs were transferred to councils which became the Native Authorities, although the chiefs sat on these councils. After independence, the authorities were renamed Traditional Authorities and continued to operate, and the status and influence of many of the chiefs revived through their cooperation with the Malawi government of Hastings Banda.

There is an ongoing debate as to whether the Native Authorities' link with the colonial governments in the British African dependencies caused their authority to become weakened and for educated "new men" to emerge as community leaders, or whether the new status and administrative and judicial powers given to them by those administrations allowed chiefs to shake off the pre-colonial restrictions on their powers and become more authoritarian and even despotic. Setting up a hierarchy of tribal paramount chiefs, subordinate chiefs and village headmen may also have served to fix previously less rigid "tribal" identities.

== Indirect rule before 1933 ==
The first two colonial Commissioners to the British Central Africa Protectorate, Harry Johnstone and Alfred Sharpe, were unwilling to involve African chiefs in the governance of the protectorate or to accept their authority. However, the poverty of the administration and the eagerness of many chiefs to secure official recognition led to the District Administration (Native) Ordinance, 1912, which allowed the governor to appoint Principal Headmen, who had only such authority and stipends as the residents (later district commissioners) for their district allowed them. Most Principal Headmen were prominent local chiefs, although in some cases preference was given to mission-educated candidates rather than those with a greater hereditary claim to chiefly status. Each Principal Headman was made responsible for a number of Village Headmen, although it was made clear that the arrangement was not intended to foster or perpetuate rule by chiefs. Amendments to the 1912 Ordinance in 1924 and 1929 extended the powers of the Principal Headmen to hear civil cases under customary law, collect hut taxes and issue certain licences.

The governor of Nyasaland between 1924 and 1929 Sir Charles Bowring was an enthusiastic advocate of conscripting forced labour to work on European tobacco farms or on public works for minimal wages. He sought Colonial Office approval to extend its use to unpaid work on road building projects, which would involve taking workers far from their homes. This was similar to the proposed use of forced labour in Kenya where the governor Sir Edward Northey had in 1919 instructed government officials to coerce African labour to work on European-owned farms and estates, despite earlier Colonial Office objections. After the scandal of Northey' proposal, the Colonial Office made clear it that any compulsory labour by local Africans must be paid; it could only be used on government projects if absolutely necessary and then only with Colonial Office approval.

Bowring had held senior positions in Kenya between 1901 and 1924, and the Colonial Secretary, Leo Amery, who wanted to avoid a repeat of the Northey scandal, vetoed his proposal and, in 1928, instructed Bowring to consider the introduction of a form of Indirect rule in Nyasaland, appointing chiefs as Native Authorities. Bowring resisted on the basis that he thought Nyasaland’s tribal organisation was disintegrating, and his tour of duty was cut short in May 1929 as a result of his opposition. His successor, Shenton Thomas, who was governor from 1929 to 1932, enthusiastically promoted Indirect rule, instructing administrative officers that chiefly authority must be strengthened where it existed and restored where it no longer existed.

== Creation of Native Authorities ==
Although Thomas’s intention was to introduce Indirect rule on the basis proposed by Lord Lugard, he was first prevented by the economic effects of the Great Depression and later promoted to the post of governor of the Gold Coast, so it was left to his successor Sir Hubert Young, governor from 1932 to 1934, to introduce a diluted version of Thomas’s proposals. This was stated to be a form of local government in response to settler opposition to full-scale Indirect rule. Under Young’s legislation, in contradiction to Lugard’s principles, the Native Authorities had no financial responsibilities and Native Courts had no jurisdiction over European-owned estates. Only in 1940 were Native Authorities given a nominal role in tax collection

The selection of Native Authorities created a number of difficulties, although the aim was to base them on local history and tradition. Generally speaking, those individuals who had been designated Principal Headmen under legislation of 1912 became Native Authorities, although in some cases educated Principal Headmen appointed by colonial officials were supplanted by traditional chiefs, where local people emphasised their legitimacy. In addition, the aspirations of the Ngoni people of northern Nyasaland for the restoration of the son of their last paramount chief were largely satisfied when he was restored and allowed to revive the title of Mbelwa, although existing Principal Headmen were retained as his subordinate chiefs. A similar arrangement was made the Ngoni of southern Nyasaland, where the descendant of the last paramount was elevated from Principal Headman to paramount, with the revived title Gomani.

A number of groups such as the Tonga people had no tradition of chiefs and elsewhere the military and political upheavals of the 19th century had resulted in there being no uncontested legitimate candidates, or situations where the existing Principal Headmen were ethically different from their people. In the lower Shire River valley, which until the mid-19th century had been populated entirely by Mang'anja people, in the northern part, some of these Principal Headmen were from the Kololo people that David Livingstone brought from Botswana in 1862 as porters for his Zambezi expedition who had driven out Mang'anja chiefs, whereas, in the southern part, Mang'anja chiefs survived as Principal Headmen, but the local population consisted of Sena people, recent migrants from Mozambique. Even among the Mang'anja headmen, there were competing claims to legitimacy.

== Locations ==
Native Authorities were located in the areas of Native Trust Land that had been created in 1916. In the early 20th century, the view among British government lawyers in the Foreign Office was that the act of declaring a protectorate over a territory gave Crown the right to dispose of land there. An Order-in-Council for government of the British Central Africa Protectorate of 1902 vested all rights to Crown lands, empowering him to dispose of any such land. In 1904, Alfred Sharpe, who was Commissioner from 1896 to 1907, received powers to create reserve out of Crown Land under the Native Locations Ordinance. By 1913, the Native Reserves covered 6.6 million acres out the 22.3 million acres of land in the protectorate, and a further 2.6 million acres of Crown Land were designated to become future reserves.

A Land Registration Ordinance in 1916 recognised the Native Reserves as Native Trust Land, to be held in trust for the benefit of their African communities. This legislation did not provide for the administration of Trust Land by those African communities or their leaders, as formal Indirect rule was only introduced in 1933-34, although, in practice, chiefs had day-to-day charge of land distribution. However, once the Native Authorities were instituted, they took over formal control of most of this land.

== Functions ==
Compared with Northern Nigeria, where Lugard has pioneered Indirect rule, or even Tanganyika Territory to the north, Nyasaland’s Native Authorities were significantly underfunded. They were entitled to two pence in every six shillings of Hut tax raised, although this was a much greater rate than Principal Headmen had previously received. In addition, Native Authorities could levy a range of fees and receive rents from leases of Native Trust Land, a valuable source of extra income where European farmers wished to grow tobacco. However, outside the tobacco-growing districts, overall Native Authority revenues were small: all of those in the Southern Province had a combined income of only £880 in 1935. This gave the Native Authorities very little scope for promoting social development, although some attempted to provide primary education, dispensaries, produce markets or rural roads.

However, the first Post-War Five-Year development plan placed significant emphasis on primary education and lead to the foundation of a number of Native Authority schools as alternatives to the dominance of mission schools in rural areas. This was continued up in the second development plan, starting in 1950, but the government only allowed such schools in selected Native Authority areas where the chiefs were government supporters.

The parallel Native Courts Ordinance, 1933 established Native Courts administering customary law. This replaced the direct judicial powers of the chiefs, although they retained an involvement in the process as advisors and assessors. The Native Courts were cautious in using their powers under the 1933 Ordinance in criminal cases at first, generally fining offenders or ordering them to pay compensation to their victims. From the late 1940s, they were more willing to use imprisonment or, in a few cases, floggings, when prompted by government officers in cases where government agricultural regulations were flouted. However, from the start, they were much used for civil cases, mainly matrimonial issues.

== Post-war decline ==
Until the mid-1940s, the Native Authority scheme was generally accepted by the people living under its operation, and a number of chiefs were seen as modernisers within the limits of their role. However, in the post-Second World War period, a time of political and economic change, the Native Authorities were seen increasingly as imposing unpopular government-mandated soil conservation measures on their people. Although a few chiefs openly opposed these schemes, most gave at least minimal cooperation to avoid being deposed by the government, but tried not to lose support and legitimacy by excessive enthusiasm for the measures. By the early 1950s, Indirect rule was barely operating in many Native Authority areas and the political initiative had passed to the Nyasaland African Congress.

Although governors up Richards, in post 1942-47, supported the Native Authority scheme, Arthur Creech Jones, who became Colonial Secretary in 1946, called on all governors in African colonies to develop a more democratic systems of local government and involve educated men in decision making. The next governor, Colby set up a system of advisory councils in which government appointees would advise each Native Authority, and higher-level councils for each district and province. The treasuries of individual Native Authorities were also, from 1949, to be grouped in an attempt at greater efficiency, but these were reforms were insufficient to reverse the decline in the system. The 1933 Native Authority Ordinance was replaced by the Native Authority Ordinance of 1946 and then by the Native Authority Ordinance of 1955. Under the 1955 Ordinance, a Native Authority was defined as any chief or other African or any council or group appointed to be a Native Authority for a particular area.

In the early Post-War period, a number of Native Authorities employed salaried employees, who replaced the role of the traditional advisors to the chief concerned, and tended to take over his role. As a result, under legislation introduced in 1953, most of the powers formerly held by individual chiefs were transferred to councils of which they were members and, usually, chairmen, and which included salaried employees.

== After independence ==
After independence as Malawi in 1963, the Malawian government halted the decline of chiefly status in the Chiefs Act, 1967. This provided for the recognition and appointment of Paramount Chiefs, Senior Chiefs, Chiefs, Sub-Chiefs, Councillors and Village Headmen as Traditional Authorities who would perform their functions of preserving peace and developing their communities according to customary law. Under the presidency of Hastings Banda, the chiefs statutory status and their ability to allocate land and development resources made them an essential part of the state apparatus. Following the restoration of multi-party politics in 1993 and the devolution of many previously-centralised powers to district councils in 1998, the chiefs who are Traditional Authorities became ex-officio members of the district councils still have a role in local government, although their control over land allocation and membership of Traditional Courts has ended.

== Sources ==
- D Cammack, E. Kanyongolo and T. O’Neil, (2009). Town Chiefs in Malawi: Africa Power and Politics Programme Working Paper No. 3. London, Department for Overseas Development
- Lord Hailey, (1950) Native Administration in the British African Territories, Part II. Central Africa: Zanzibar, Nyasaland and Northern Rhodesia. London, HMSO.
- O. J. M. Kalinga, (1996). Resistance, Politics of Protest, and Mass Nationalism in Colonial Malawi, 1950-1960. A Reconsideration. Cahiers d'Études Africaines, No. 143.
- I. C. Lamba, (2010). Contradictions in Post-war Education Policy Formulation and Application in Colonial Malawi 1945-1961. Zomba, African Books Collective. ISBN 978-9-99088-794-5.
- J McCracken, (2012). A History of Malawi, 1859–1966, Woodbridge, James Currey pp. 130–2. ISBN 978-1-84701-050-6.
- L. P. Mair, (1951). Some Native Authorities in Nyasaland. Man (Royal Anthropological Institute journal), Vol. 51.
- Malawi Law Commission, (2012). Special Law Commission on the Review of the Chiefs Act, Paper 1, Background. Zomba, Malawi Law Commission.
- C. Ng'ong'ola, (1990). The State, Settlers, and Indigenes in the Evolution of Land Law and Policy in Colonial Malawi. The International Journal of African Historical Studies. Boston University African Studies Centre. Vol. 23, No. 1.
- O. Okia, (2008). The Northey Forced Labour Crisis, 1920-1921: A Symptomatic Reading. The International Journal of African Historical Studies, Vol. 41, No. 2.
- B. Pachai, (1973). Land Policies in Malawi: An Examination of the Colonial Legacy. The Journal of African History. Vol. 14 No. 4.
- J. Power, (1992). Individualism is the Antithesis of Indirect Rule: Cooperative Development and Indirect Rule in Colonial Malawi. Journal of Southern African Studies, Vol. 18, No. 1.
- J. Power, (2010). Political Culture and Nationalism in Malawi: Building Kwacha. University of Rochester Press. ISBN 978-1-58046-310-2.
- R. I. Rotberg, (1965). The Rise of Nationalism in Central Africa: The Making of Malawi and Zambia 1873–1964, Cambridge (Mass), Harvard University Press.
