= List of colonial governors of Nyasaland =

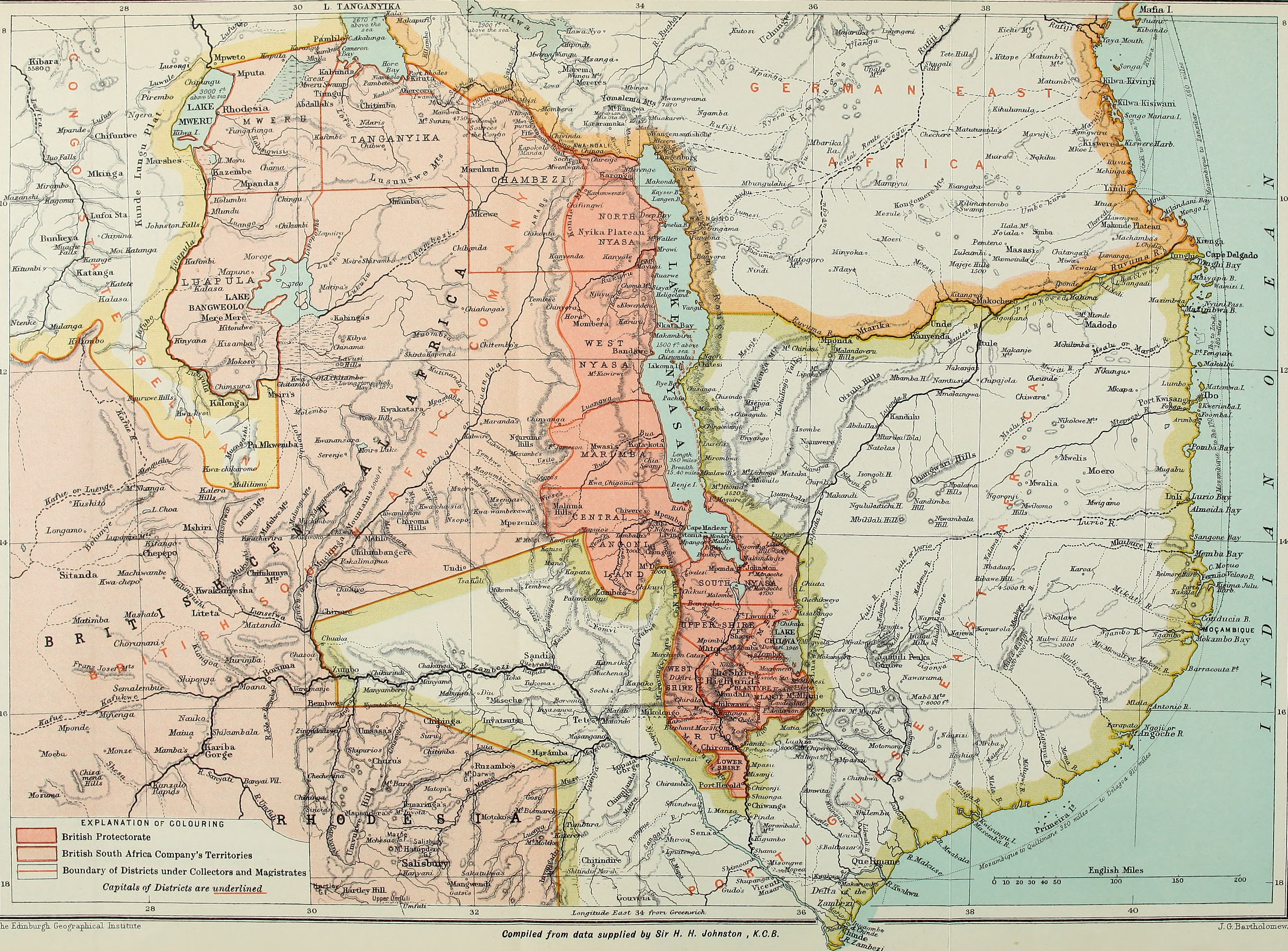
The British Central Africa Protectorate (dark pink), 1897.

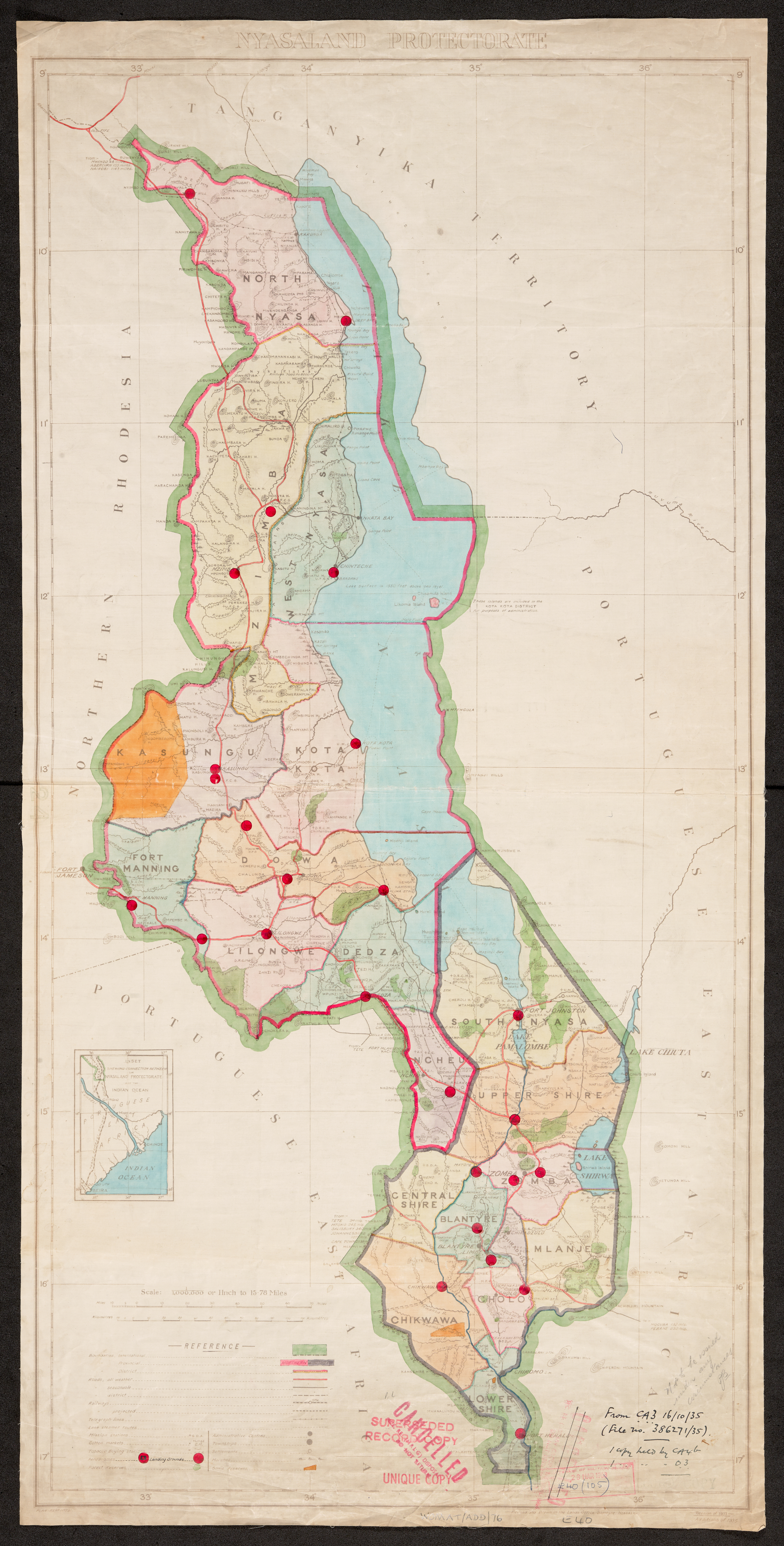
Nyasaland (bordered in green), 1935.

This article lists the governors of the British Central Africa Protectorate and Nyasaland from 1891 to 1964. They administered the territory of modern-day Malawi on behalf of the United Kingdom.

== List ==
(Dates in italics indicate de facto continuation of office)

| Tenure | Portrait | Incumbent | Notes |
|---|---|---|---|
Nyasaland Districts Protectorate
| 1 February 1891 to 1893 | | Harry Johnston, Commissioner | |
British Central Africa Protectorate
| 1893 to 16 April 1896 | | Harry Johnston, Commissioner | |
| 16 April 1896 to 1 April 1907 | | Alfred Sharpe, Commissioner | From 1 January 1902 he was Commissioner, Commander-in-Chief and Consul-General |
Nyasaland
| 1 April 1907 to September 1907 | | Francis Barrow Pearce, acting Commissioner | |
| October 1907 to 1 May 1908 | | William Manning, acting Governor | 1st term |
| 1 May 1908 to 1 April 1910 | | Alfred Sharpe, Governor | |
| 1 April 1910 to 4 July 1910 | | Francis Barrow Pearce, acting Governor | |
| 4 July 1910 to 6 February 1911 | | Henry Richard Wallis, acting Governor | |
| 6 February 1911 to 23 September 1913 | | William Manning, acting Governor | 2nd term |
| 23 September 1913 to 12 April 1923 | | George Smith, Governor | Knighted during tenure |
| 12 April 1923 to 27 March 1924 | | Richard Rankine, acting Governor | |
| 27 March 1924 to 30 May 1929 | | Charles Calvert Bowring, Governor | |
| 30 May 1929 to 7 November 1929 | | Wilfred Bennett Davidson-Houston, acting Governor | |
| 7 November 1929 to 22 November 1932 | | Shenton Thomas, Governor | Knighted during tenure |
| 22 November 1932 to 9 April 1934 | | Hubert Winthrop Young, Governor | |
| 9 April 1934 to 21 September 1934 | | Kenneth Lambert Hall, acting Governor | |
| 21 September 1934 to 20 March 1939 | | Harold Baxter Kittermaster, Governor | |
| 20 March 1939 to 8 August 1942 | | Donald Mackenzie-Kennedy, Governor | |
| 8 August 1942 to 27 March 1947 | | Edmund Charles Smith Richards, Governor | |
| 30 March 1947 to 10 April 1956 | | Geoffrey Colby, Governor | Knighted during tenure |
| 1 August 1953 to 31 December 1963 | Incorporated into the Federation of Rhodesia and Nyasaland | | |
| 10 April 1956 to 10 April 1961 | | Robert Perceval Armitage, Governor | |
| 10 April 1961 to 6 July 1964 | | Glyn Jones, Governor | |
| 6 July 1964 | Independence as Malawi | | |

For continuation after independence, see: List of heads of state of Malawi

== See also ==
- History of Malawi
- Governor-General of the Federation of Rhodesia and Nyasaland
