= Nyasaland famine of 1949 =

Famine in protectorate of Nyasaland

The Nyasaland famine of 1949 was a famine that occurred in the Shire Highlands in the Southern Province of Nyasaland (now Malawi) and also in a part of the Central Province in 1949. Its effects extended into the early part of 1950. The immediate cause was severe droughts in December 1948 to January 1949 and in March 1949 that destroyed much of the maize crop on which the people of the affected areas relied during its main growing season. This followed two years of erratic rainfall and poor harvests which had depleted the reserves in farmers’ granaries. The effect of crop failure was intensified by the failure of the colonial government to maintain a suitably large emergency grain reserve, delays in importing sufficient relief supplies and its requirement that most of the relief provided was paid for by its recipients. The official death toll from starvation was some 200 people, which may be an underestimate, and it excludes those dying of diseases exacerbated by malnutrition.

There is significant disagreement on the underlying causes of the famine. At first, it was blamed on over-intensive cultivation causing soil erosion and on growing tobacco rather than food crops. Later, colonial underdevelopment through land expropriation, levying rents and taxes on African farmers and underpaying them for their labour and produce was suggested. More recently, attention has been focussed to the uneven economic and social development of the protectorate in the 1930s and 1940s. This created, firstly, an increased number of employees and tradesmen, who needed to buy their food but who were dependent on the uncertain surpluses arising the system of subsistence agricultural because few farmers produced food primarily for the market rather than their own consumption, and governmental marketing organisations that, far from providing incentives for the production of maize, underpaid those farmers that did grow it commercially. In addition, a range of social changes created an underclass of those without adequate access to farmland or secure employment, vulnerable in times of food shortage: this included many women.

== Agriculture and climate ==
=== Rain-fed agriculture ===
Throughout the colonial period, the main subsistence crop of the upland areas that formed much of Nyasaland was maize, which had been introduced from Mozambique, probably starting from the 18th century, and which largely supplanted the previous staple cereals sorghum and millet in the late 19th and early 20th centuries. By the end of the colonial era, maize accounted for 60% of the areas planted with food crops, providing Nyasaland's inhabitants with over half their calories. Very few cattle were kept in the Shire Highlands, although many smallholders kept a few sheep or goats and most had at least some chickens.

The traditional maize grown in 1949 was late-maturing variety, requiring at least five to eight centimetres of rainfall in each of the first three months of growth, and a further month to ripen. The Shire Highlands generally meets these conditions throughout the normal five-month growing season but, as maize cultivation was mostly rain-fed, variations in the annual rainfall led to substantial fluctuation in crop production

Most of Nyasaland's rain was generated when the Intertropical Convergence Zone passed over the country, usually between November one year and March the next year, but the amount of rainfall varied under the influence of the El Niño–Southern Oscillation and other climate anomalies. Regional climatic studies have identified an intense episode of drought throughout Southern Africa between 1946 and 1949. This caused widespread famine in South Africa and Southern Rhodesia in 1947 and less severe droughts in Nyasaland in 1947 and 1948 that led to poor harvests in those years. The severe famine in southern Malawi in 1949 was probably the last phase of this episode of drought.

=== Access to land ===
In the 1940s, Nyasaland smallholders relied on hand hoeing, and a farming family which included two able-bodied adults whose main crop was maize could cultivate 4.5 to 5 acres of land (2.0 hectares) a year; single women were barely able to farm one hectare without assistance. Around 1949, average maize yields were 0.4 ton to an acre (equivalent to 0.9 tonne a hectare). Pressure on access to land increased from the 1940s: even those with access to sufficient arable land might suffer seasonal hunger before harvests, and occasionally endure more serious food shortages in years of inadequate rainfall. Other family units with less land or labour available were frequently at risk of hunger.

About 70% of African smallholders in the Shire Highlands occupied Native Trust Land, for which they paid no rent. This amounted to around 50% of the land in that area and, as the local population increased, Native Trust Land became congested, and much of it was used for almost continuous maize monocropping without crop rotation or fallow. Only those with larger holdings could grow significant amounts of cash crops, and tobacco, the one cash crop widely grown with government encouragement in the Central Province, was less suited to the wetter Shire Highlands, so its cultivation was not encouraged there.

The other 30% of African farmers were tenants on European-owned estates. These estates occupied almost 700,000 acres (280,000 hectares) in the Shire Highlands or about 50% of the available land, including much of the most fertile land in this area. Estate tenants owed rent, originally satisfied by a form of labour service called thangata, but by 1949 it was normally paid either in cash or by delivering specified quantities of tobacco or other cash crops to the landowner. Although there was a significant amount of available land on these estates and rural landlessness was rare, the obligation to produce cash crops to pay rent reduced the areas of land and amount of labour that could be devoted to growing the tenants' own food crops.

=== Agricultural marketing ===
Before the Second World War, little was done in Nyasaland to encourage the commercial production and distribution of food. Although town dwellers needed to purchase their food, little was grown for sale rather than subsistence, as towns were few and small and transport was expensive. It was left to African smallholders and tenants sell their surpluses on local markets and for small-scale African entrepreneurs to distribute food over limited areas. In normal years, most farmers had only small surpluses to sell in local markets. In addition, government policies that paid artificially low prices for the maize which it bought acted as a disincentive to its production for sale.

The Nyasaland government made a number of wartime emergency regulations to control agricultural production, and it made some of these permanent in the post-war period. In 1947, it set up a Maize Control Board, aiming to ensure supplies of maize were maintained for over 67,000 workers and town dwellers in the Southern Province and the others elsewhere who were unable to grow their own food. However, it was underfunded, it paid very low prices for the maize it bought and it was reluctant to promote higher maize production for the home market or for export on the grounds of the cost of purchasing and storing it.

The Maize Control Board aimed to handle only around 5% of the national crop and to set up a small grain reserve. However, as its first two years of operation coincided with the poor harvests of1947 and 1948, it only managed to buy around 2% of the crop in those two years, and was unable to establish any reserve. After the famine, the Board more than doubled the price it paid for maize and handled from 7% of the maize crop in 1951, rising to over 10% of an increased crop in 1952.

== Narrative ==
Although seasonal hunger before crops were ready to harvest was common in Nyasaland, famine was relatively infrequent in the Shire Highlands during the century after 1850, and the area was sometimes a refuge for those fleeing famine from nearby areas of Mozambique. One drought recorded by early missionaries was in the years 1861 to 1863, which coincided with a time of acute political upheaval that dislocated agriculture, and another occurred in 1922.

The 1949 famine occurred in an area of Nyasaland undergoing rapid economic change in the period after the Second World War. Blantyre District was not simply an area of subsistence farming but one of growing employment in the adjacent towns of Blantyre and Limbe, on European-owned tobacco or tea estates or as migrant labour in the Rhodesias and South Africa. Many local African smallholders grew cash crops, mainly tobacco, and farm land was becoming congested and under pressure to produce enough food crops for a growing urban and rural population. The population of Blantyre District was becoming differentiated and much of it, urban and rural, relied on cash earnings to purchase some or all of their food needs.

The 1949 famine was most severe in the Lunzu and Lirangwe areas of Blantyre District, north of Blantyre city, and was an experience beyond the memory of all except the oldest inhabitants who remembered the 1922 famine. Serious food shortages also occurred in Dedza and Port Herald (Nsanje) districts in that year.

=== Failing rains ===
The rainfall in 1947 and 1948 had been erratic, and in 1947 swarms of locusts had destroyed crops. These events forced farmers to use their stored maize, emptying the reserves in their granaries in advance of the 1949 harvest.

The rainy season of 1948-9 began well in Blantyre District, but the rains lessened in November and December 1948, and six rainless weeks followed in late December and January 1949, normally the wettest part of the season, when no rain clouds were seen. There were considerable local variations, but the worst affected areas had only half their average annual rainfall and lost up to a third of their expected crop. Some of the earliest-planted maize survived but much of the main crop died, and some farmers were unable to replant their maize for lack of rain and because few had any saved seed to plant after the poor harvests of the previous two years. Those with land near riverbanks that retained moisture could harvest some crops, others had relatives in less severely affected areas or received food rations from their employers, but the majority were dependent on what their own land could grow.

=== Initial reaction ===
The initial government response was hampered by a lack of maize available to distribute. In January, the District Commissioner in Blantyre District became concerned about a growing black market in maize flour in the Blantyre town market, and arranged for some of the maize held in a government store to be sold in that market, although the one ton a day released for sale was only sufficient to feed around 500 families. In February 1949, the governor of Nyasaland did not consider that large amounts of famine relief would be needed. He asked the Southern Rhodesian government to send 1,000 tons of maize as soon as possible, and appointed a local businessman as African Foodstuffs Commissioner to arrange supplies of maize and other staple foods, hoping that the business community would assist in its distribution.

After some light rains in February, there was a further four-week drought in March 1949. By then, the situation had become really serious, as most of the maize remaining in farmers’ granaries had been exhausted, much of their cash savings had been spent on buying food and most of their livestock had been sold. Many walked long distances to areas that still had maize for sale or foraged for wild foods. The latter included wild varieties of yam and other tubers, edible roots, small mammals and insects. In many cases, help from better-off relatives dried up as the drought continued, and many men deserted the wives and families that they could not feed.

Small amounts of sweet potatoes and cassava planted by some farmers were available from May to September, but only in September 1949 did the government open food distribution centres. These sold maize at three pence a pound and allowed families to purchase 20 pounds for five shillings each week. Those people without cash, even women deserted by their husbands, had to work for food, as only small numbers of the very elderly and destitute were given minimal free rations. Initially, these centres issued whole maize kernels which had to be pounded but, by January 1950, some of the centres issued ready milled maize, as many women were too weak to pound it, and could not afford to have it milled.

=== Climax ===
Despite the government food distribution, in December 1949 and January 1950, many people in the worst affected areas, particularly young children and the old, showed signs of severe malnutrition, and deaths occurred among the most vulnerable. Some feeding camps were set up where the elderly and destitute were fed maize porridge twice a day, and the worst cases were taken to Blantyre hospital. Around 200 people were reported to have died of starvation: the shock caused by these famine-related deaths was disproportionate to this official mortality figure, because serious famine had reappeared in this area without warning after an absence of more than a quarter of a century The official mortality figure may also be an underestimate and it excludes many weakened by hunger, particularly young children and the elderly, that died of diseases they might otherwise have recovered from.

The government issued free maize seed and cassava cuttings to those sufficiently able-bodied to plant them, and the 1950 harvest was reasonably plentiful despite the weakness of many farmers. In the planting season of 1950/51 many planted drought-resistant cassava as well as maize. The people in the worst-affected areas took some years to recover physically from the famine and to repay their debts and build up food reserves and savings. The social effects, in cases where men had deserted their families or relatives had refused to help distressed families, lasted for many years.

=== Social differences ===
African businessmen or skilled workers and the better-paid government employees that had sufficient cash or assets were little affected by the famine, as were soldiers, policemen and some employees of European or Asian enterprises that were given food rations as part of their pay. Self-employed artisans and traders and those in low-paid, often casual, employment suffered a drastic fall in income as their customers prioritised buying food, or their employment ceased: the degree to which they suffered depended on what savings or saleable assets they had.

How smallholding farmers managed depended on what cash and food reserves, livestock or other assets they had. In normal times, female-headed households, including those of widows and deserted wives, were usually the poorest group in the community, with little access to land. They often survived by casual work such as beer-brewing or food-for-work labour, both of which ended during the famine. Unless their relatives helped them, these women and their families were very vulnerable. On the other hand, many households of migrant workers received cash from absent husbands throughout the famine.

== Relief measures ==
=== A slow start ===
In the early months of 1949, when it was clear that most of the maize crop planted in late 1948 would be lost because of drought, the Nyasaland government asked the Rhodesian Maize Control Board, which had been set-up in the 1930s and maintained buffer stocks and imported of maize to send maize to Nyasaland by rail, even though there were already shortages in Northern Rhodesia and one was predicted for Mashonaland. Around 12,500 tons of maize was supplied by these means, 7,500 by June 1949. As widespread crop failure in South Africa and Southern Rhodesia in 1947 had depleted regional stocks, further emergency supplies had to be brought in from further afield. A total of 12,500 tons of maize was imported by sea during the remainder of 1949 and 1950, mostly from the United States and East Africa.

One problem was finding enough ships in the post-war period to transport the purchased maize by sea to the congested port of Beira. A second was that rail link from Beira to Malawi was interrupted by the collapse of the bridge at Chiromo in late 1948, which limited the amount of maize that could be imported and then distributed through a poorly developed road network. Once the supplies of maize reached the affected areas the government opened food distribution centres in September 1949 to sell maize at controlled prices.

=== Government actions ===
The governor Sir Geoffrey Francis Taylor Colby stated that maize rations should be used, firstly, to support essential services such as police and the army, secondly to provide relief in the most affected areas and, thirdly, to contribute towards a reserve, which reached 6,000 tons after the 1950 harvest. He was particularly concerned that making maize available at food distribution centres might discourage people from making their own provisions against future famines.

The effects of the drought of 1948-49 were exacerbated by the colonial government's failure to hold food reserves or provide relief supplies rapidly. Although the last major famine in the Shire Highlands was in 1922, there had been local food shortages here, particularly in Blantyre District in 1939, 1941 and 1947. Resistance to holding food stocks arose partly from the weak finances of the Nyasaland government, but also from an attitude that government food stores would discourage farmers from keeping their own food reserves and make them dependent on the government in the future.

=== After 1949 ===
Government opposition to holding food reserves changed in the aftermath of the 1949 famine, and governor Colby took a number of steps to prevent a recurrence. Some of these steps were clearly beneficial: in addition to setting up a reserve maize store, he instructed the Maize Control the Board to increase the price paid for maize significantly, which encouraged farmers to grow maize for sale. In addition, he asked the owners of private estates to grow maize for their own workers on their own land, rather than purchasing it from smallholders. To reduce the overcrowding that existed in some Native Trust land, the government accelerated a scheme to purchase surplus land on the estates, although the largest purchases were from 1952 onwards.

The first of two more doubtful steps was the reduction in the price that the Native Tobacco Board paid for tobacco grown on Native Trust lands. The governor's intention was to reduce the volume of tobacco grown while increasing its quality and using the increased profit the Board made for agricultural development. This significantly reduced the incomes of most of the farmers that had grown tobacco and did little in the short term to increase the quality of the crop. The introduction in the early 1950s of a compulsory registration scheme for tobacco growers led to a 20% reduction in their numbers by 1955.

Secondly, the agricultural development that the governor proposed involved the appointment of government agricultural officers to enforce soil conservation and land use legislation that was bitterly resented by many African smallholders as it involved them in unpaid labour and took some cultivable land out of use. Although the main architect of these schemes claimed they were vital to prevent an environmental catastrophe, this view was later contradicted and, until the 1980s, soil fertility in most of the country remained adequate.

== Causes of the famine ==
=== Views in 1949 ===
Although the immediate cause of an almost complete failure of the maize harvest in large parts of the Shire Highlands was a lack of rain at critical points in the growing season, the extent and intensity of the ensuing famine in the area has been attributed to a number of additional causes. Later research has cast doubt on the reality of those causes that were widely canvassed at the time, and suggested other possible reasons.

Even before 1949, Nyasaland's colonial Agriculture Department held negative views about African agricultural practices, and predicted that, unless they were checked, they would cause a rapid decline in soil fertility This opinion has been contradicted by more recent research, which showed that in 1998, almost 50 years after the 1949 famine, most soils in Malawi were adequate for growing maize, as fertility had declined much less rapidly than the department had forecast. Most soils tested in 1998 still contained sufficient organic material and nutrients for crop growing, if barely so, although they would have benefited from chemical fertilisers or manure.

Another view that attempted to place a degree of blame on African smallholders on Native Trust Land was that they were growing tobacco to the detriment of food production. Relatively little tobacco was grown on Native Trust Land in the Shire Highlands, partly as the Native Tobacco Board discouraged it where it competed with tobacco grown on European-owned private estates and partly as grades of leaf suitable for cigarettes were difficult to grow in the climate of the Shire Highlands. Farm surveys indicate that only farmers with larger holdings in that area grew tobacco, and these also retained most of their land for food crops.

Tenants on the private did estates often grow tobacco and other saleable crops to pay rents in lieu of cash, although some preferred to grow maize to sell in local markets and pay a cash rent. Some large private estates were destroying soil fertility by seeking quick profits: a government survey showed that many were badly managed and deforested, and that their soil and grassland had been abused. However, most tenants had sufficiently large plots to feed their families and grow the required cash crops; only those tenants with insufficient land or labour to cultivate it suffered in the famine.

=== Underdevelopment theories ===
Nyasaland has been described as an Imperial Slum, or as a failed Colonial State by two leading proponents of the underdevelopment view of colonialism. The imposition of rents on tenants on private estates and underpayment for the produce of smallholders, together with taxes on both groups, certainly constituted a significant burden on African farmers. However, in the economic boom of the 1940s, these impositions were less significant than in earlier periods.

Both Vail and Mandala suggest that the Imperial government showed little interest in Nyasaland, a country without valuable resources but with heavy administration costs. These authors concentrate on the period before 1939, when government revenue was low, with much of it coming from taxes on Africans, and mostly absorbed in routine administration costs, leaving very little available for development. Both also concentrate on the inefficiency and perceived high cost of the protectorate's transport system.

However, Vail's argument that the cost of railway links impoverished the country, preventing the government from promoting efficient peasant agriculture is overstated for the latter part of the half-century he covers. The Nyasaland government only had to pay interest and repay capital on the loans for constructing the Trans-Zambezia Railway or Zambezi Bridge if its revenues exceeded target figures. During the period 1930 to 1947, it only paid interest in 1936 and repaid no capital at all. All the accrued liabilities passed to the Federation of Rhodesia and Nyasaland in 1953.

=== Coping strategies ===
The seasonal hunger common in pre-colonial times gave rise to several coping strategies. In a subsistence economy, farmers grew food for their families’ needs and small surpluses were usually stored, bartered for livestock or given to dependants Markets where food was exchanged for cash were established during the colonial era, and it is likely that introduction of a market economy eventually created an underclass of the chronically malnourished poor. The older strategies were supplemented by the use of cash to make good food deficits, whether it was earned directly, remitted by a migrant worker relative or borrowed.

Some coping strategies were still in use in 1949, including growing drought resistant crops like millet, cassava or sweet potatoes in case the maize crop failed, gathering wild food or relying on support from family or friends. However, the growing of sorghum and millet was actively discouraged by government agricultural policies, which also discouraged the cultivation of riverbanks and marshland, both of which retained moisture after the rainy season. Although these policies originated before the 1949 famine, they were not relaxed during or immediately after it.

The coping strategies described were meant to deal with seasonal hunger, but they helped at least some of those affected by the 1949 famine, mainly during its early stages. However, the vulnerable groups, including old or disabled people, single women and others without family support were less able to use these strategies.

=== Vulnerable groups ===
The colonial economy created winners and losers: in 1949, most of Nyasaland's people either experienced hunger that was not life-threatening or, in the case of the most privileged, little or no hunger at all. It was the new vulnerable groups that arose during the colonial period who suffered most in that famine. These included men made landless by eviction from private estates, widows and deserted wives with children, who were unable to cultivate enough land for their subsistence, and casual employees and those self-employed people reliant on a previously buoyant economy.

In the terms proposed by Amartya Sen, the vulnerable groups mentioned above either lacked a food entitlement or had had their food entitlement sharply reduced by a change in their circumstances, and their exposure to famine was an entitlement failure. A minority of people in Nyasaland in 1949, soldiers, police, some workers on private estates and domestic servants received food rations or food at subsidised prices. Urban workers such as clerks earned enough to give them food security and the families of migrant workers often received cash remittances that gave them security.

However, the majority of people in 1949 depended on agriculture not rations or earnings. In the years before 1949, a rising population led to fear of land shortage, to more intense cultivation and possibly to some over-cropping. Even so, in the 30 years following the famine, smallholders adapted to smaller farm plots with a substantial increase in the production of maize and other food crops, once the incentives they received made this possible. It was therefore either not having access to sufficient land to grow their own food or lacking a secure cash income that created the casualties of the 1949 famine. It was not that there was insufficient land or that it was badly managed so much as its distribution was uneven.

== Food insecurity in Malawi ==
For around 30 years after the 1949 famine, the country suffered no significant droughts and its farmers were able to adapt to smaller plots and to increase the production of maize and other food crops substantially, by benefiting from improved seeds and fertilizer. Between 1950 and 1979 the annual maize crop exceeded consumption except in 1963, 1970, 1975 and 1976 and shortfalls were made good from reserves. However, after 1980 food insecurity became an increasing problem in the country, leading to a perennial Malawian food crisis.

Bad weather in 1980, 1990, 1997 and 1998 significantly reduced maize harvests, but famines were avoided. In 1997 and 1998, famine was averted by the release of government grain reserves and overseas maize purchases, whereas in 2001 and 2002, when harvests were not as bad as in 1997 or 1998, deficiencies in grain reserves and import delays led to a significant famine.

Malawi suffered widespread food shortages in the 1990s and 2000s, and several of the issues which arose then were the same as those already apparent in 1949. These included the use of land for farming tobacco and other non-food crops, the growth of an underclass of land-poor or landless rural people who were dependent on casual work and the strict governmental controls on growing and marketing of certain crops. In more recent times, as in 1949, it was the lack of food reserves within the country and delays in importing relief supplies that turned shortages into famine. Even the idea, probably incorrect in 1949, that soil fertility was declining and soil erosion was becoming critical had become true by 1992, when cultivation had spread up hillsides and onto steep Rift Valley slopes, where erosion was inevitable and unsustainable.

== Sources ==
- C Baker, (1975). “Tax Collection in Malawi: An Administrative History”. The International Journal of African Historical Studies Vol.8 No.1 (1975).
- C Baker, (1994). “Development Governor: a biography of Sir Geoffrey Colby”. London, British Academic Press. ISBN 1-85043-616-9.
- J Bishop, (1995). “The Economics of Soil Degradation: An Illustration of the Change in Productivity Approach to Valuation in Mali and Malawi”. London, International Institute for Environment and Development.
- A Conroy, (2006). ” “Malawi and the Poverty Trap” in A Conroy, M J Blackie and others “Poverty, AIDS and Hunger” Basingstoke, Palgrave. ISBN 978-1-40399-833-0.
- J Farringdon, (1975). “Farm Surveys in Malawi”. University of Reading, Department of Agricultural Economics.
- E Green, (2011). “Indirect Rule and Colonial Intervention: Chiefs and Agrarian Change in Nyasaland, ca. 1933 to the Early 1950s”. The International Journal of African Historical Studies, Vol. 44, No. 2.
- M Hulme (editor) (1996) “Climate Change and Southern Africa”. Norwich 1996, University of East Anglia Climatic Research Unit.
- J Iliffe, (1985). “The Poor in the Modern History of Malawi”, A conference paper presented at “Malawi: An Alternative Pattern of Development”, Centre of African Studies University of Edinburgh.
- J Iliffe, (1990). “Famine in Zimbabwe 1890-1960”, Zambeziana Vol.20. Gweru, Mambo Press. ISBN 978-0-86922-459-5.
- A G Irvine, (1959). “The Balance of Payments of Rhodesia and Nyasaland, 1945-1954”. Oxford University Press.
- T S Jayne, S Jones and Others, (1997). “Maize Marketing and Pricing Policy in Eastern and Southern Africa”, in D Byerlee and C K Eicher (editors) “Africa’s Emerging Maize Revolution”. Boulder, Lynne Rienner. ISBN 978-1-55587-776-7.
- J A K Kandaŵire, (1977). “Thangata in Pre-Colonial and Colonial Systems of Land Tenure in Southern Malaŵi, with Special Reference to Chingale”. Africa: Journal of the International African Institute, Vol. 47, No. 2.
- R W Kettlewell, (1965). “Agricultural Change in Nyasaland: 1945-1960”. Food Research Institute Study No.5.
- J McCann, (2005) “Maize and Grace: Africa’s Encounter with a New World Crop, 1500-2000”. Harvard University Press. ISBN 0-67401-718-8.
- J McCracken, (1985). “Share-Cropping in Malawi: The Visiting Tenant System in the Central Province c. 1920-1968”. A conference paper presented at “Malawi: An Alternative Pattern of Development” Centre of African Studies, University of Edinburgh.
- J McCracken, (2012). A History of Malawi, 1859–1966. Woodbridge, James Currey. ISBN 978-1-84701-050-6.
- Malawi Government, (2002). “State of the Environment Report 2002”. Lilongwe, Ministry of Natural Resources and Environmental Affairs.
- E Mandala, (2006). “Feeding and Fleecing the Native: How the Nyasaland Transport System Distorted a New Food Market, 1890s-1920s". Journal of Southern African Studies. Vol. 32 No.3.
- A A Miller, (1964). “Climatology” 9th edition, London, Methuen.
- B Morris, (2016). “An Environmental History of Southern Malawi: Land and People of the Shire Highlands”, Palgrave Macmillan. ISBN 978-3-31945-257-9.
- A K Mwakasungura, (1986). “The Rural Economy of Malawi: A Critical Analysis” Bergen, Chr. Michelsen Institute, Publication No.97.
- Nyasaland Protectorate, (1946). “Report of the Post-war Development Committee”. Zomba, Government Printer.
- Nyasaland Protectorate, (1955). “An Outline of Agrarian Problems and Policies in Nyasaland”. Zomba, Department of Agriculture.
- J G Pike, (1969). “Malawi: A Political and Economic History”. London, Pall Mall Press.ISBN 0-26967-214-1.
- E M Rasmusson, (1987). “Global Climate Change and Variability: Effects on Drought and Desertification in Africa”, in M H Glanz (editor) “Drought and Hunger in Africa – Denying Famine a Future”. Cambridge University Press. ISBN 978-0-52132-679-7.
- A Sen, (1981). “Poverty and Famines: An Essay on Entitlements and Deprivation”. Oxford, Clarendon Press. ISBN 0-19828-463-2.
- S S Snapp, (1998). “Soil Nutrient Status of Smallholder Farms in Malawi”. Communications in Soil Science and Plant Analysis Vol. 29.
- C H Thompson and H W Woodfall (1956). “Economic Development in Rhodesia and Nyasaland”. London, Dennis Dobson.
- Z G Tiba, (2005) “A New Type of Famine with a Traditional Response: the Case of Malawi, 2001-2003”.
- L Vail, (1975) “The Making of an Imperial Slum: Nyasaland and its Railways, 1895-1945”. The Journal of African History, Vol. 16, No. 1.
- M Vaughan, (1987). “The Story of an African Famine: Gender and Famine in Twentieth-Century Malawi”. Cambridge University Press. ISBN 978-052103-551-4.
- M Vaughan, (1991) “Changing Forms of Famine”. Journal of African History, Vol. 32 No. 2.
- M Vaughan, (1992). “Famine Analysis and Family Relations: Nyasaland 1949”, in S Fierman and J M Jantzen, “The Social Basis of Health and Healing in Africa”. Berkeley, University of California Press. ISBN 0-52006-680-4.
- L. White, (1987). “'Magomero: Portrait of an African Village”. Cambridge University Press. ISBN 0-521-32182-4.
- T Woods, (1993). “´Why not persuade them to grow Tobacco?` Planters, Tenants and the Political Economy of Central Malawi, 1920-1940”. African Economic History Vol. 21.
- A Young, (2000) “Land Resources: Now and for the Future” Cambridge University Press. ISBN 0-52159-003-5.
