= William Manning (colonial administrator) =

British general and colonial administrator

Brigadier-General Sir William Manning GCMG KBE CB
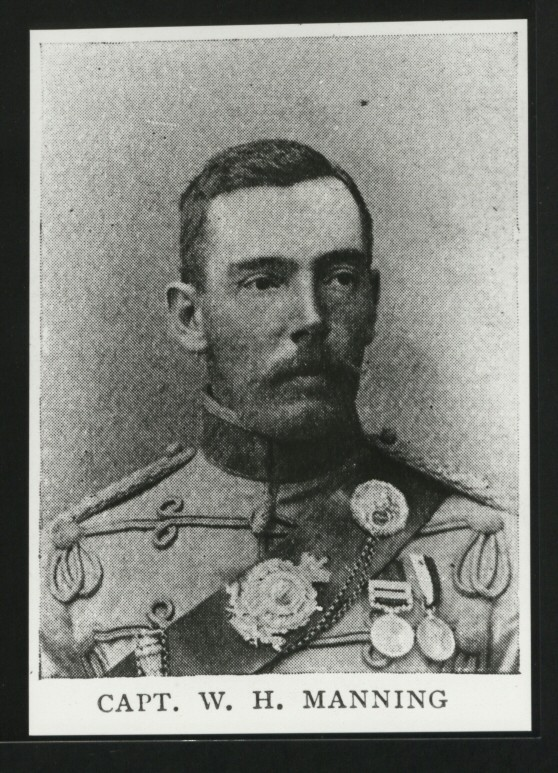
- Captain. W. H. Manning (photo taken from British Central Africa by Sir Harry Johnston 1897)

23rd Governor of British Ceylon
- In office 10 September 1918 – 1 April 1925
- Monarch: George V
- Preceded by: Reginald Edward Stubbs; (Acting governor)
- Succeeded by: Cecil Clementi; (Acting governor)

Commissioner of British Somaliland
- In office February 1910 – November 1910
- Preceded by: Harry Edward Spiller Cordeaux
- Succeeded by: Horace Byatt

Governor of Nyasaland (acting)
- In office 6 February 1911 – 23 September 1913
- Preceded by: Henry Richard Wallis (acting)
- Succeeded by: George Smith

Governor of Jamaica
- In office 7 March 1913 – 11 May 1918
- Monarch: Edward VII
- Preceded by: Philip Clark Cork
- Succeeded by: Robert Johnstone

Personal details
- Born: William Henry Manning; 19 July 1863
- Died: 1 January 1932 (aged 68)
- Citizenship: British

Brigadier-General Sir William Henry Manning GCMG KBE CB (19 July 1863 – 1 January 1932) was a British Indian Army officer and colonial administrator.

== Early life ==
Manning was born in Droitwich on 19 July 1863. He was educated at the University of Cambridge as a non-collegiate student and the Royal Military College, Sandhurst. He was commissioned a lieutenant in the South Wales Borderers in 1886. In 1888 he transferred to the Indian Army, and served in the 51st Sikhs. He was wounded in the Second Burmese War and also served in the First Miranzai Expedition and the Hazara Expedition on the North-West Frontier in 1891. He commanded the Mlanja and Chirad-Zulu expeditions in British Central Africa in 1893–1894.

== Diplomatic and military service in Africa ==
In 1897 he was appointed deputy commissioner and consul-general for British Central Africa and commander of its armed forces with the local rank of lieutenant-colonel, and served as acting commissioner for nearly two years. He commanded the operations against Chief Mpezeni in North-East Rhodesia in 1898, for which he was promoted to brevet major in 1898 and brevet lieutenant-colonel in 1899.

Manning raised and commanded the Central Africa Regiment and was the first inspector-general of the King's African Rifles from 1901 to 1907, with the local rank of brigadier-general, although his substantive rank was still captain. During Spring 1902 he undertook an official tour through Uganda and the East African Protectorate, returning to England in June that year. He was supposed to undertake a second tour of inspecting garrisons in British Somaliland, British Central Africa Protectorate, British East Africa and Uganda later the same year, but shortly after his arrival in Africa he was re-directed to join the force gathered in Somaliland to fight Mohammed Abdullah Hassan.

He was in Somaliland by the middle of November 1902, and in late December was appointed in command of the Somaliland Field Force. From 1903 to 1904 he commanded its 1st Brigade. In April 1903 he fought against the Mad Mullah's army in battle, inflicting 2,000 casualties. For his services in Somaliland he was appointed Companion of the Order of the Bath (CB) in 1903 and Knight Commander of the Order of St Michael and St George (KCMG) in 1904. In February 1904 he was promoted to brevet colonel and in August 1904 he was finally promoted to the substantive rank of major.

== Commissioner of Somaliland and governor of Nyasaland ==
In February 1910 Manning was appointed commissioner and commander-in-chief of the Somaliland Protectorate and in November 1910 Governor and C-in-C of the Nyasaland Protectorate, where the border post Fort Manning (now Mchinji, Malawi) was named after him. He retired from the Indian Army in December 1910.

== Governor of Jamaica and governor of Ceylon ==
In February 1913 he became governor of Jamaica and was granted the perpetual honorary rank of brigadier-general, which he had held for most of his service since 1901. In September 1918 he was appointed governor of Ceylon. He was appointed Knight Commander of the Order of the British Empire in 1918 and Knight Grand Cross of the Order of St Michael and St George (GCMG) in the 1921 New Year Honours. He retired in 1925.

The Manning Cup school football competition in Jamaica was named after him.

== Family ==
In 1920, he married Olga Mary Sefton-Jones. They had three daughters:

- Marie G. B., born in Marylebone, London in 1922. She married John F. Reid-Dick in 1947 at Staines.
- Rowena Margaret, born in Hanover Square, London 1926. In 1951, at Middlesex South, she married Lord Northbrook.
- Dora K. M., born in Hollingbourne, Kent, in 1928. She never married.

Manning died in Hollingbourne, Kent, on 1 January 1932, aged 69.

== Footnotes ==
Government offices
Preceded by Reginald Edward Stubbs acting governor	Governor of British Ceylon; 1918-1925	Succeeded by Cecil Clementi acting governor
