= John Sturrock (colonial administrator) =

British colonial administrator

Sir John Christian Ramsay Sturrock CMG (20 March 1875 – 13 February 1937) was a British colonial administrator. He served as Resident Commissioner in Basutoland, from 1926 to 1935.

== Early life and education ==
Sturrock was born in Madras, British India, the second son of John Sturrock CIE of Dundee, Scotland, and his wife, Regina Mary Dobbie, daughter of Gen. George Staple Dobbie. He was educated at Charterhouse School. He graduated B.A. at Balliol College, Oxford in 1898, M.A. in 1902.

== Career ==
Sturrock acted as tutor to Daudi Cwa II of Buganda, a government appointment, and accompanied him to England in 1913. He was appointed a District Commissioner in Uganda in 1914; and Provincial Commissioner in 1922. In the early 1920s he helped set up dispensaries in Uganda.

Described as "progressive" by Gill, Sturrock began a programme of reform in what is now Lesotho in the 1920s. He made a good impression on Margery Perham, a visitor to Basutoland around the end of 1929. He took the view that indirect rule had not been applied effectively; and initiated judicial and administrative reform measures that were applied over a period of a dozen years.

In 1935, Sturrock was replaced as Resident Commissioner by Edmund Charles Smith Richards.

Sturrock was appointed a Companion of the Order of St Michael and St George (CMG) in the 1927 Birthday Honours, when he was Resident Commissioner in Basutoland. He was knighted in the 1934 Birthday Honours

== Family ==
Sturrock married on 19 April 1917 Blanche Elizabeth Walker, third daughter of Daniel Houston Walker of Middlesbrough.
