= Donald Mackenzie-Kennedy =

British colonial administrator

Sir Donald Mackenzie-Kennedy KCMG

Governor of Nyasaland
- In office 20 March 1939 – 8 August 1942
- Preceded by: Harold Baxter Kittermaster
- Succeeded by: Edmund Charles Smith Richards

Governor of Mauritius
- In office 5 July 1942 – 5 December 1948
- Preceded by: Bede Edmund Hugh Clifford
- Succeeded by: Hilary Rudolph Robert Blood

Personal details
- Born: Henry Charles Donald Cleaveland Mackenzie-Kennedy; 1889
- Died: 2 August 1965 (aged 75–76)

Sir Henry Charles Donald Cleaveland Mackenzie-Kennedy KCMG (1889 – 2 August 1965) was a British colonial administrator who was Governor of Nyasaland between 1939 and 1942, and 25th Governor of Mauritius from 5 July 1942 to 5 December 1948.

In 1930, Mackenzie-Kennedy was Chief Secretary of Northern Rhodesia. He was urged to deny the Ndola Welfare Association permission to meet, since mine owners might react unfavorably to an organization such as this being led by civil servants. In June 1935, he wrote to Sir Stewart Gore-Browne urging him to stand for election in Broken Hill, to Northern Rhodesia's legislative council, saying "Your duty is clear."

== Family ==
Henry Charles Donald Cleaveland Mackenzie-Kennedy was the son of Maj.-Gen. Sir Edward Charles William Mackenzie-Kennedy K.B.E. C.B. and his wife Ethel née Fuller. His birth was registered in the Sep Q of 1889 at Hastings, Sussex. He married Mildred, daughter of Rev. J. G. Munday and his wife Edith née Chadwick, in 1919 in the Wandsworth registration district of London.
