= Francis Barrow Pearce =

British imperial administrator and author (1866-1926)

Francis Barrow Pearce CMG (16 September 1866 – 11 June 1926) was a British imperial administrator and author.

He was acting Commissioner of Nyasaland (now Malawi) from 1 April 1907 to September 1907 and acting Governor of Nyasaland from 1 April 1910 to 4 July 1910. In 1914, he became British Resident in Zanzibar, working alongside the protectorate's High Commissioner Henry Conway Belfield.

In 1920, his Zanzibar: the Island Metropolis of Eastern Africa was published in Great Britain by T. F. Unwin.

== Bibliography ==
- Zanzibar: the Island Metropolis of Eastern Africa (1920)
- Rambles in Lion Land: Three Months' Leave Passed in Somaliland

=== Papers ===
- Le bassin de la haute Wichéra with Louis Duparc and Margarita N. Tikhonovich in Volume 3 of Recherches géologiques et pétrologiques sur l'Oural du nord (1909)
