= Wilfred Bennett Davidson-Houston =

British army officer and colonial administrator

Lieutenant-Colonel Wilfred Bennett Davidson-Houston
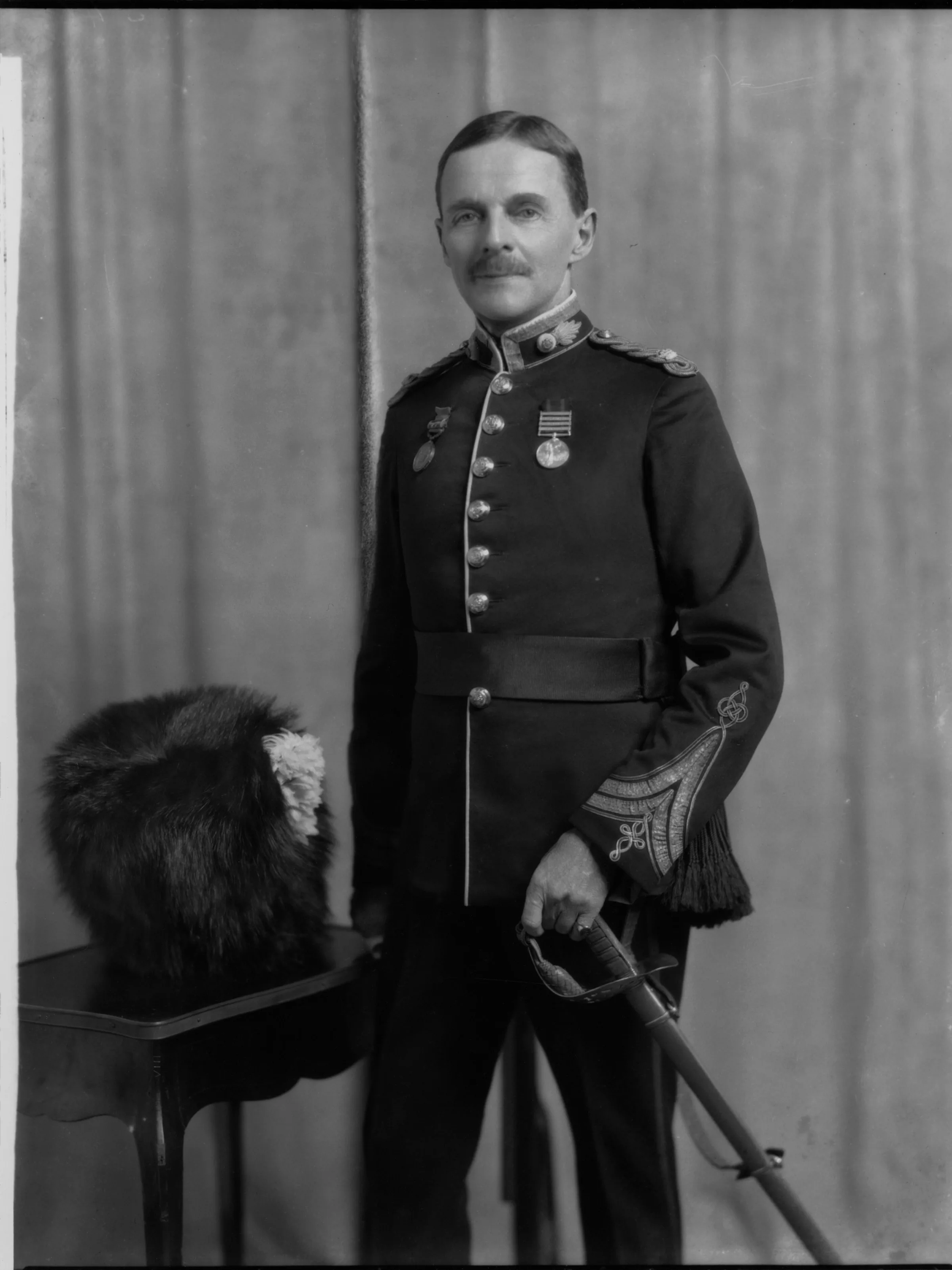
- Davidson-Houston in 1927

Commissioner of Montserrat
- In office 1906–1918
- Preceded by: Frederick Henry Watkins
- Succeeded by: Claude Forlong Condell

Administrator of Saint Lucia
- In office 1918–1927
- Preceded by: Gideon Oliphant-Murray
- Succeeded by: Charles William Doorly

Acting Governor of Nyasaland
- In office 30 May 1929 – 7 November 1929
- Preceded by: Charles Calvert Bowring
- Succeeded by: Shenton Thomas

Personal details
- Born: 3 January 1870
- Died: 18 September 1960 (aged 90)

Wilfred Bennett Davidson-Houston CMG (3 January 1870 – 18 September 1960) was a British army officer who fought in the Anglo-Ashanti wars and later became a colonial administrator in the British West Indies.

== Background ==
Wilfred Bennett Davidson-Houston was born on 3 January 1870, the second son of Reverend B.C. Davidson-Houston of County Cork and Dublin. He attended Corrig School, Monkstown, Dublin in Ireland and St Edward's School, Oxford.

== Military career ==
In 1887 Davidson-Houston was commissioned a second lieutenant with the 5th (Militia) battalion of the Royal Dublin Fusiliers. He was promoted to lieutenant in 1889, captain on 26 November 1892, major on 11 October 1902 and lieutenant colonel in 1906. Davidson-Houston was assigned to the British South Africa Company Police, and was assistant commissioner in Mashonaland (1890–1892). He was assistant inspector of Gold Coast Hausas (1894) and captain of the West African Frontier Service, Kwahu (1894–1895). He served in the Fourth Anglo-Ashanti War (1895–1896), and in subsequent operations in the Gold Coast (1897–1898), and was acting resident Ashanti (1899–1900). He served in the Ashanti Campaign (1900) and the Second Boer War (1901–1902).

== Colonial administrator ==
In August 1902, he was seconded for service under the Colonial Office, and appointed commissioner of Ashanti (1902) and acting chief commissioner of Ashanti (1903–1905).

In 1906, Davidson-Houston was appointed commissioner of Montserrat in the British West Indies. During the First World War he was D.A.Q.M.G. Central Force (1915), Eastern Command (1916), Headquarters 1st Army, B.E.F. (1917) and Deputy Controller of Labour, France (1918). He was administrator of Saint Lucia, British West Indies (1918–1927). During this period he was several times acting governor of the Windward Islands. Davidson-Houston was chief secretary, Nyasaland (1927–1930), and was twice acting governor, Nyasaland.

Davidson-Houston married Annie Henrietta, oldest daughter of land agent Colonel Edmond Langley Hunt, C.M.G., of Curragh Bridge House, County Limerick (of a landed gentry family of Friarstown and Ballysinode), and they had two sons. He retired in 1930. He died on 18 September 1960, aged ninety.
