= Charles Calvert Bowring =

British colonial administrator

Sir Charles Calvert Bowring KCMG KBE
- Bowring in 1921

Governor of Nyasaland
- In office 27 March 1924 – 30 May 1929
- Preceded by: Richard Sims Donkin Rankine
- Succeeded by: Wilfred Bennett Davidson-Houston

Personal details
- Born: 20 November 1872 Cranbourne, Berkshire, England
- Died: 13 June 1945 (aged 72) Bedford, Bedfordshire, England
- Spouse: Ethel Watts
- Relations: Humphrey Wykeham Bowring (brother); John Charles Bowring (father); John Bowring (grandfather)
- Children: 7
- Education: Clifton College

Sir Charles Calvert Bowring KCMG KBE (20 November 1872 – 13 June 1945) was a British colonial administrator, mainly in Kenya, who was later Governor and Commander in Chief of the Nyasaland Protectorate from 1923 to 1929.

== Early life ==
Bowring was born in Cranbourne, Berkshire, the son of Hong Kong businessman John Charles Bowring and grandson of Sir John Bowring. Humphrey Wykeham Bowring was his younger brother. He was educated at Clifton College. Bowring joined the Colonial Audit Branch in 1890 and served in the Far East until 1895 when he was appointed local auditor in the British Central Africa Protectorate.

== East Africa ==
In 1899 he moved to East Africa to become auditor for the East Africa Protectorate and the Uganda Railway. He quickly rose to prominence, being made treasurer of the Protectorate in 1901, and was appointed to the newly instituted Legislative Council in 1907. He was appointed a Companion of the Order of St Michael and St George (CMG) in the 1908 Birthday Honours.

He was appointed Chief Secretary to the Government of the protectorate in 1911, remaining Chief Secretary if what was later transformed from a protectorate to be from 1920 the Colony and Protectorate of Kenya from 1911 until 1924, when he was appointed Governor of Nyasaland. During this period he was also a Grand Deacon of the United Grand Lodge of England. In October 1912 Bowring was appointed to a commission on labour in Kenya. The report was published in 1913, and contained written and aural submissions from over two hundred Europeans and sixty Africans. Much of this evidence had been called a "concerted display of negrophobe malevolence".

Between 1917 and 1919 Bowring was acting Governor of the East African Protectorate. He became acting governor of the EAP at a time when the colony was recovering from famine, there was a shortage of manpower and settlers were becoming increasingly assertive. Bowring was not always favourable to settlers, and he pushed measures that could benefit the African population and was less bigoted than many Kenyan settlers about the Indian immigrants. However, when face to face with settlers he often gave in to their demands. He was a supporter of the idea that two nominated Indians and one African should be added to the Legislative Council. He was appointed a Knight Commander of the Order of the British Empire (KBE) in the 1919 Birthday Honours.

In response to a financial crisis in the colony, he proposed to increase the hut and poll taxes. Despite resistance from the Colonial Office, he pushed the measure through, to take effect in the 1920–1921 fiscal year. Although supporting the idea of settling veterans of the First World War in the colony, he pointed out that there were shortages both of land and of labour, and said that settlers should have capital of more than £500. He was strongly in favour of extending the railway across the Uasin Gishu plateau for the benefit of the settlers in that area.

Bowring was promoted to Knight Commander of the Order of St Michael and St George (KCMG) in the 1925 Birthday Honours.

== Nyasaland ==
Bowring was appointed Governor and Commander in Chief of the Nyasaland Protectorate in 1923. and held office until 30 May 1929. In October 1925, Bowring laid the foundation stone of the new buildings at Livingstonia, which Dr Robert Laws wanted to develop into a university for African students in Nyasaland and neighbouring colonies. He wrote "Livingstonia appeals to me enormously as a training centre because of its comparative isolation and at the same time easy accessibility. The students are away from the many temptations of town life, and within easy reach by the lake and in touch by telegraph".

Bowring believed that the future of the Nyasaland protectorate would be based on developing agriculture. A few European planters would be involved in this project, but mostly the land was to be developed by Africans instructed by Europeans. He was against setting aside large amounts of land for European use. About the shortage of land for Africans in the Shire Highlands he said "the only method of dealing with the problem is to re-acquire from the landowners in convenient blocks of sufficient area to accommodate the natives at present resident on the estates for whom accommodation acceptable to them and to Government cannot be provided elsewhere on Crown Land". He proposed to pay for the scheme through a graduated land tax, hitting the largest estates hardest.

There were delays and disputes over the proposed reforms. In the second half of 1926 Bowring returned to England on leave and met officials at the Colonial Office in person, but was not able to gain their agreement to his proposal for settling the land problem. In 1927 he submitted a revised bill to the Legislative Council, and finally in 1928 the "Native Tenants on Private Estates Bill" was passed. Africans resident on estates were liable to pay rent in cash or kind equivalent to about 2–3 months' pay, and in return would get a plot of land large enough to grow crops for their family and materials for a hut. The owner could not claim rent if he refused to offer work.

Official policy in Nyasaland was to consolidate villages to facilitate administration and control. By the late 1920s the practice had largely been abandoned. Bowring tried to revive it, trying to gain support from chiefs and district officers, but it lapsed again after he had left office. On the question of the future of Northern Rhodesia (now Zambia), Bowring was in favour of a three-way partition. Part would go to South Africa and part to Southern Rhodesia, while the northeast would be combined with Nyasaland in joining an East African federation.

Bowring was an enthusiastic advocate of conscripting forced labour to work on European tobacco farms or on public works at minimal wages. He sought Colonial Office approval to extend its use to unpaid work on road building projects, often taking workers far from their homes. This was similar to the proposed use of forced labour in Kenya where the governor Sir Edward Northey had caused a scandal with his 1919 instruction to government officials to coerce African labour to work on European-owned farms and estates, despite earlier Colonial Office objections.

The Colonial Secretary, Leo Amery, who wanted to avoid a repeat of the Northey scandal, vetoed the proposal and, in 1928, instructed Bowring to consider the introduction of a form of Indirect rule in Nyasaland, appointing chiefs as Native Authorities. Bowring resisted on the basis that he thought Nyasaland's tribal organisation was disintegrating and his tour of duty was cut short in May 1929.

== Personal life ==
In 1909, he married Ethel Dorothy Watts CBE, daughter of G. K. Watts; they had four sons and three daughters.

== Sources ==
- Anderson, David; Grove, Richard H. (1990). Conservation in Africa: Peoples, Policies and Practice. Cambridge University Press. ISBN 0-521-34990-7.
- Baker, Colin (1993). Seeds of trouble: government policy and land rights in Nyasaland, 1946-1964. British Academic Press. ISBN 1-85043-615-0.
- Chanock, Martin (1977). Unconsummated union: Britain, Rhodesia and South Africa, 1900-45. Manchester University Press ND. ISBN 0-7190-0634-1.
- Clayton, Anthony; Savage, Donald C. (1975). Government and labour in Kenya, 1895-1963. Routledge. ISBN 0-7146-3025-X.
- Fox-Davies, Arthur Charles (1929). Armorial families: a directory of gentlemen of coat-armour. Hurst & Blackett, ltd.
- Mangan, J. A. (1988). 'Benefits bestowed'?: education and British imperialism. Manchester University Press ND. ISBN 0-7190-2517-6.
- Maxon, Robert M. (1993). Struggle for Kenya: the loss and reassertion of imperial initiative, 1912-1923. Fairleigh Dickinson Univ Press. ISBN 0-8386-3486-9.
- McCracken, John (2008). Politics and Christianity in Malawi, 3ed: The Impact of the Livingstonia Mission in the Northern Province. African Books Collective. ISBN 978-99908-87-50-1.
- J McCracken, (2012). A History of Malawi, 1859–1966, Woodbridge, James Currey pp. 130–2. ISBN 978-1-84701-050-6
- O. Okia, (2008). The Northey Forced Labour Crisis, 1920-1921: A Symptomatic Reading. The International Journal of African Historical Studies, Vol. 41, No. 2 pp 263–4.
- Morgan, Frank (2010). Reflections of Twelve Decades. Strategic Book Publishing. ISBN 978-1-60976-067-0.
- Walker, Eric Anderson (1957). A history of southern Africa. Longmans.
