= Edmund Charles Smith Richards =

British colonial administrator (1889–1955)

Sir Edmund Richards

Resident Commissioner of Basutoland
- In office March 1935 – August 1942
- Preceded by: John Christian Ramsay Sturrock
- Succeeded by: Charles Noble Arden-Clarke

Governor of Nyasaland
- In office 8 August 1942 – 27 March 1947
- Preceded by: Donald Mackenzie-Kennedy
- Succeeded by: Geoffrey Francis Taylor Colby

Personal details
- Born: 6 October 1889
- Died: 1955 (aged 65–66)

Sir Edmund Charles Smith Richards (1889–1955) was a British colonial administrator who was Resident Commissioner of Basutoland from 1935 to 1942 and Governor of Nyasaland from 1942 to 1947.

== Career outline ==
Edmund Charles Smith Richards was born on 6 October 1889. After joining the colonial service, he rose steadily through the ranks, becoming a district commissioner in 1923, assistant secretary for native affairs in 1927, deputy provincial commissioner in 1928, provincial commissioner in 1931, deputy chief secretary in 1934, acting chief secretary in 1934 and resident commissioner, Basutoland from 1935 to 1942. Richards became Governor of Nyasaland in August 1942, retiring in March 1947. He died in 1955.

== Central African Council ==
A Central African Council was created in 1945 to coordinate research activities, economic policies and the transport and communication systems of Nyasaland, Northern Rhodesia and Southern Rhodesia. Richards saw no particular value to Nyasaland in the council. Sir Stewart Gore-Browne of Northern Rhodesia objected to the name since no Africans were represented. Talking of the first session, Gore-Browne described Richards as an "ill-mannered oaf". The key topic discussed by the council was that of recruitment and treatment of Native labor. Nyasaland was the main supplier of non-indigenous African laborers to Southern Rhodesia. The main debate was between Richards and the prime minister of Southern Rhodesia, Godfrey Huggins. Although the council had no power to make a decision on the subject, the two men both freely aired their views. Richards was initially hostile to the idea of establishing joint services to serve the three colonies, but later came round to the idea of extending services such as Civil Aviation and the Court of Appeal from Southern Rhodesia to also cover the northern territories.

== Other Nyasaland issues ==
One of the issues Richards had to deal with was that of education of the Africans. In 1945, Richards received a memorandum from the newly formed Nyasaland African Congress (NAC) saying the members disliked sending their boys to the college at Makerere in Uganda "because the standard of education attained is lower than that attained in South African Schools...". The age limit system was also an issue with primary education. Under this system, children could not enroll if they were too old, and without birth certifications they were subject to arbitrary estimates of whether they were young enough to attend school. Girls suffered in particular when they were unable to start education early for reasons that were out of their control. Richards did nothing to resolve the problem, but supported age limits.

On 15 February 1946, Richards sent proposals to the Colonial Office to change the method of selecting members of the legislative council. These included introducing elections for the European "unofficial" members (members other than civil servants), and giving the unofficial members the majority.
