= Geoffrey Colby =

British colonial administrator (1901–1958)

Sir Geoffrey Colby KCMG
- Sir Geoffrey Francis Taylor Colby

Governor of Nyasaland
- In office March 1948 – March 1956
- Preceded by: Edmund Charles Smith Richards
- Succeeded by: Robert Perceval Armitage

Personal details
- Born: 25 March 1901
- Died: 22 December 1958 (aged 57)

Sir Geoffrey Francis Taylor Colby KCMG (25 March 1901 – 22 December 1958) was a British colonial administrator who was Governor of the protectorate of Nyasaland between 1948 and 1956. He fought unsuccessfully against creation of the Federation of Rhodesia and Nyasaland.

== Birth and education ==
Colby was born on 25 March 1901, son of a doctor, and was raised in Woking Surrey, England. He attended St Wilfred's, a preparatory school, at Bexhill-on-Sea between the ages of seven and thirteen, and in 1914 went on to Charterhouse, a school that taught the virtues of leadership, public service and keeping a cool head in emergencies. An excellent sportsman, he played both cricket (in the 1st XI) and football for the school. Colby retained a passion for cricket throughout his life. It was said that when Governor of Nyasaland he delayed a meeting of his executive council for half an hour so he could listen to the closing overs of a test match. Colby won an open scholarship to Clare College at the University of Cambridge, as well as a leaving exhibition from Charterhouse, where he read Natural Sciences (Chemistry) from 1919, taking a third-class degree in 1922. He played poker and tennis and owned a Norton motorcycle which he used to go on trips to London. He was also known quite frequently to climb into college after hours up a wall which was considered by a fellow undergraduate and Alpine mountaineer to be a difficult and dangerous climb.

== Early career ==
After leaving university, Colby spent a year as an assistant master at his old prep school, and a year working in a fellmongers factory at Galashiels. He then applied for an appointment in the Colonial Service, and was posted to Nigeria in 1925. In Nigeria he was first a District Officer in the Northern region at a salary of £500, with £60 advanced for essential equipment. His duties involved lengthy tours on horseback in the hot, dry climate of the North to check on tax collection, the courts and public works. His health during this period was poor, and he always had a jaundiced appearance, perhaps in part due to poor diet.

When on leave in England in 1930, Colby was introduced to Lilian Florence Illingworth, then aged 25. They became engaged, and were married on 17 January 1931. He was unable to take his wife back with him to Nigeria, since his position did not allow for a wife, and it took a year before he obtained a suitable post in the Lands and Mines department in the Kaduna secretariat, where he was joined by Lilian. Colby was posted to Kontagora in 1935 as District Officer, an isolated post. He was an energetic and efficient administrator, improving the roads and increasing crop production. In 1939 he became an Assistant Secretary in the Finance branch of the Lagos secretariat. He rose quickly through the ranks to be made an Administrative Secretary in 1945, in which role he acted as Chief Secretary and Governor's Deputy. This appointment was created for him by the governor, Sir Arthur Richards, and represented an unusual advancement over the heads of scores of other colonial officers . In 1947 he was awarded CMG in the Birthday Honours List. He was knighted two years later.

== Governor of Nyasaland ==
Colby was appointed Governor of Nyasaland by Secretary of State Arthur Creech Jones, arriving there on 7 January 1948. This was a Class III Governorship under the Governors' Pension Act and so somewhat disappointing. It carried a salary of £2,500 per annum with a £500 duty allowance . He inherited an awkward problem of land allocation. The BCA Company owned large areas of land, some densely populated, that could not be developed without evicting the tenants. Other estates were underdeveloped, while there was a shortage of land for the Africans. A Land Planning Committee recommended that the government acquire some of this land for use by Africans. In November 1948, at Colby's recommendation, the composition of the Legislative Council was changed to include two African and one Asian "unofficials" and three officials.

Colby supported greater educational opportunities for Africans, but his influence was negative. He opposed compulsory attendance, as requested by the chiefs, and supported age limits for entry into school. The latter harmed girls, who would often delay entering school until a later age. Colby accepted the position of Chief Scout of the Nyasaland Boy Scouts, and his wife became President of the Girl Guides, giving both these organisations a boost.

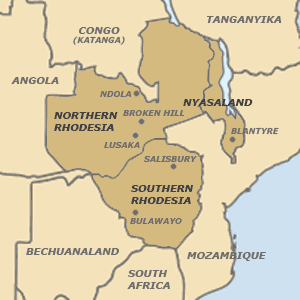
Federation of Rhodesia and Nyasaland

Colby was opposed to the creation of the Federation of Rhodesia and Nyasaland against the wish of African leaders such as James Frederick Sangala. He advised the Colonial Office to exclude Nyasaland from the planned federation, but his advice was ignored. The Conservative government pushed ahead with plans, deciding in a January 1953 conference that the federation would come into effect in August 1953. When the federation was inaugurated there were riots in which eleven Africans were killed and many injured. For a period, the moderate influence of the Nyasaland African Congress was weakened. In a letter to his successor, Robert Armitage, Colby said: "I advised originally against the inclusion of Nyasaland not because I objected so much to the idea of federation but rather because I was convinced that there was no goodwill towards us or understanding of our problem in Salisbury. I fear I have to say that this had been born out in practice. I do not believe that federation can succeed unless there is a complete change of heart in Salisbury – at present I can see no sign of this".

With federation a fait accompli, Colby said "Our job and primary object in the next few years must be to allay African fears ... and to convince the African population that Federation is in their best interests and indeed is in the interest of all communities in this territory". Colby recommended giving Africans a greater say in government, including opening more civil service jobs to Africans who were qualified, and paying more attention to African leaders. He expected that Nyasaland would eventually become self-governing, but not for many years. In July 1955, Colby announced a radical change in the structure of the legislative council to take effect after elections in 1956. The new council would consist of eleven colonial officials and eleven elected representatives. Of the "unofficials", six would be European, elected by the European Voter's Roll, and five African, elected by the three Provincial Councils.

In January 1956, in one of his last communications as Governor, Colby pointed out to the Colonial Office the inequities of revenue distribution in the federation. He said that revenue from Nyasaland and Northern Rhodesia had been "devoted to bolstering a bankrupt and under-taxed Southern Rhodesia and the major part of the federal government's share of loan funds raised since federation has been spent or earmarked in Southern Rhodesia". He warned against creeping changes in federal policy on non-African agriculture, and warned that this could lead to "a dangerous security situation". Colby told Armitage that his greatest problem would be the "conglomeration of smart alecks" at the Colonial Office.

Colby left Nyasaland in March 1956. He died in Manchester on 22 December 1958.
