= Robert Spence Hynde =

Scottish planter in Nyasaland (1868–1931)

Robert Spence Hynde (1868–1931) was a Scottish planter in Nyasaland. Original a lay missionary for the Church of Scotland, he left his mission work and later ran plantations for coffee and tobacco. He was a newspaper proprietor, and an influential figure among the British colonists.

== Life ==
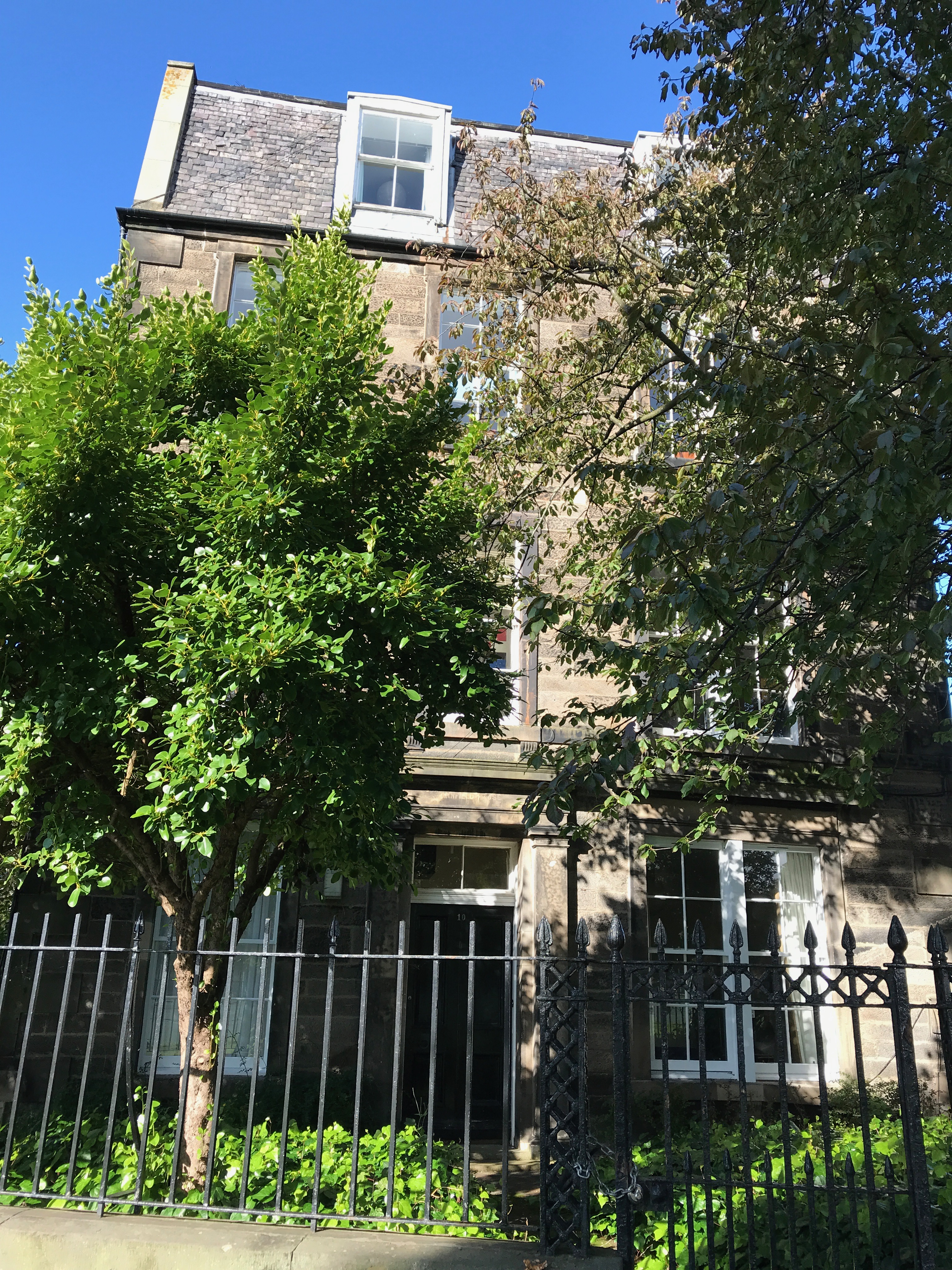
Annfield House, Hope Park Square, 2017 photograph

He was the son of Thomas Hynde of Edinburgh, a clothier of 6 Calton Street in 1867, and then in business at 13 Union Place, with a residence Annfield House on Hope Park Square. His mother was Margaret Seymour Elliott McKenzie, who died in 1872 at the Union Place address. She was the only daughter of Alexander M'Kenzie, a factor of Braco Castle in Perthshire, which lies between Muthill and Dunblane.

Hynde went as a missionary and teacher to Domasi in 1888; his wife was with him there in 1892. In autumn 1891, returning from his mission work to Edinburgh and lecturing, his address was 8 Dryden Place. His father was an elder of New Greyfriars Church (i.e. the New congregation at Greyfriars Kirk), which in 1892 collected money for his salary in Africa.

In 1891 Hynde published in the Scottish Geographical Magazine an article "Among the Machinga Yao", which included a description of villages of the Yao people in the area of Domasi; Domasi was the centre of the territory of Malemia, a Yao chief who had conquered the Mang'anja people in the late 1860s. Hynde wrote a First (1892) and Second Yao-English Primer (SPCK, 1894).

As was earlier the case with John Buchanan, Hynde was a lay missionary who served out the time of his contract, and then became a settler. Hynde disagreed with David Clement Scott, head from 1881 of the Blantyre mission and an advocate of the ordination of Africans. From the early 1890s onwards, Hynde gathered support from other Scottish planters, and intrigued in the Church of Scotland against Scott with the help of James Rankin DD, minister of Muthill.

== Settler ==
John McCracken's history of Malawi calls Hynde "a shrewd and pugnacious Scot". Elsewhere he wrote of Hynde as "combative, uncompromising".

In 1893 Hynde and Robert Ross Stark went into business as tobacco planters at Songani, in the Zomba district; Stark had married Hynde's sister Margaret, and joined Hynde in Nyasaland in 1892. That year, Hynde travelled into Mozambique, in order to recruit for the Songani estate from the Lomwe people. They experimented with Nicotiana rustica, known under its local name as labu, and noted the customs for its drying and curing. But they turned to American tobacco seed, imported from Virginia, to satisfy European tastes. By 1901 Hynde was returning to African curing techniques.

British moves to establish more control, and their high-handed approach to the land, provoked African resistance. Hynde and Stark were caught up in a violent episode in 1895, reported on by David Scott at Damosi, and Harry Johnston, administrator of the Nyasaland Districts Protectorate he had set up in 1891. Scott wrote home to Scotland about an attack in early 1895 on the mission station. It was carried out by followers of Kawinga, a Yao chief with a base on an inaccessible hill, who started off by molesting Malemia's people, taking some prisoner. Attacks by Kawinga aimed at the mission were driven off by Malemia, and then by British-led Sikhs and Atonga under Alfred Sharpe. On 27 January a boma was partially completed by Malemia's men with an NCO of the Royal Engineers named Fletcher, as a defensive work. A serious attack by Kawinga's forces came on 7 February, backed by other local chiefs, targeting the mission, the boma and Hynde and Stark's residence.

Johnston's account has Hynde and Stark bringing up another group of Atonga to the fight around the boma, at the moment when its defenders charged. From Scott's point of view, Fletcher and his men had little choice about charging, since they were running out of ammunition. Kawinga's men broke.

In 1895 Hynde founded the Central African Planter, a newspaper which survives after changes in title as The Daily Times. He set it up with Stark. The Planter voiced complaints from the white planters against David Scott. In his introduction to a 1985 reprint of the Planter, McCracken mentions criticism of racism in its pages, commenting on "offensive passages, revealing only of the coarsely prejudiced minds of those who conceived them". He also credits Hynde's editorial line with a major part in prompting the Commission of Inquiry into Scott's mission work. Hynde wrote to The Scotsman on the matter under the name "The Planter", and with Dr James Rankin attended the 1897 meeting in Edinburgh of the Foreign Mission Committee of the Church of Scotland that nominated the Commission.

== Blantyre and East Africa Company ==
Hynde acted as general manager of Blantyre and East Africa Ltd from 1901 to 1918. It followed the death in 1896 of John Buchanan, who with his brothers David and Robert owned 167,823 acres (67,916 ha) of land, concentrated near Zomba, Blantyre and Cholo in Thyolo District. Hynde with John William Moir, brother of Frederick Moir of the African Lakes Corporation, belonged to a Scottish group who took over those estates and in 1901 transferred them to a company set up in 1898.

Initially the company concentrated on coffee production; then it diversified. Hynde and Stark's pioneering efforts in growing tobacco then led to it becoming a significant cash and export crop, with African tenant farmers, the African Lakes Corporation and the British South Africa Company all involved. Cotton was grown on lowland areas, and tea successfully introduced in the Mlanje area.

Later William Tait Bowie was general manager in Nyasaland. William Tait Bowie was chairman, and Stark managing director.

== Death ==
Hynde's funeral took place at Edinburgh Crematorium on 23 June 1931. It was attended by Robert Laws, representing the Presbytery of Blantyre in Nyasaland; and John Tait Bowie represented his father William Tait Bowie, mayor of Blantyre.

== Family ==
Stark on being appointed secretary of Blantyre and East Africa Ltd returned to Edinburgh. He survived Hynde, dying in 1956. Stark and Margaret Hynde had two sons and three daughters who survived him. Their son Robin Forsyth Hynde Stark married Christine Orr; in 1943 when they became engaged, Robert Ross Stark was living at 8 Dryden Place, Edinburgh.
