= John Buchanan (horticulturalist) =

Scottish horticulturist in Central Africa

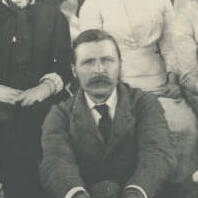
- Born: 15 May 1855; Muthill
- Died: March 1896 (aged 40); Chinde
- Occupation: businessperson

John Buchanan (1855–1896), was a Scottish horticulturist who went to Central Africa, now Malawi, in 1876 as a lay member of the missionary party that established Blantyre Mission. Buchanan came to Central Africa as an ambitious artisan: his character was described as dour and devout but also as restlessly ambitious, and he saw in Central Africa a gateway to personal achievement. He started a mission farm on the site of Zomba, Malawi but was dismissed from the mission in 1881 for brutality. From being a disgraced missionary, Buchanan first became a very influential planter owning, with his brothers, extensive estates in Zomba District. He then achieved the highest position he could in the British administration as Acting British Consul to Central Africa from 1887 to 1891. In that capacity he declared a protectorate over the Shire Highlands in 1889 to pre-empt a Portuguese expedition that intended to claim sovereignty over that region. In 1891, the Shire Highlands became part of the British Central Africa Protectorate. John Buchanan died at Chinde in Mozambique in March 1896 on his way to visit Scotland, and his estates were later acquired by the Blantyre and East Africa Ltd.

== Family background ==
John Buchanan was born in Muthill, Perthshire on 15 May 1855. His father, John Buchanan, was a skilled worker at Drummond Castle who married Helen (née Gilbert) in 1844; they had six known children: Duncan (b. 1851), Mary (b. 1853), John (b. 1855), David (b. 1858), Christina (b. 1860) and Robert (b. 1862). John Buchanan was married in 1893 and died at Chinde in Mozambique on his way from the British Central Africa protectorate to Scotland in March 1896. Two of his brothers died at Blantyre in the protectorate, David in 1892 and Robert in 1896, a few months after John's death. His son, John Buchanan (1896–1976) was a doctor who worked in the colonial medical services of Tanganyika, Somaliland and Aden between 1925 and 1940 and, after war service with the Royal Army Medical Corps in East Africa and the South Pacific, joined the Colonial Office Medical Service becoming its Chief Medical Officer in 1960.

== Missionary activities ==
Buchanan had been apprenticed as a gardener at Drummond Castle as a youth, and in 1876 traveled to Blantyre in what is now Malawi to work as a horticulturist and gardener. He was one of the original party under the leadership of Henry Henderson that founded the Church of Scotland Blantyre Mission. This mission was founded 15 years before a British protectorate was declared over the whole country.

=== Background to the mission ===
The Scottish missions in Central Africa owed their origin to the activities of David Livingstone, who first explored the area in 1858-9 and described it as a suitable field for missionary enterprise and European settlement. However, his optimistic assessment was overtaken by a major famine in 1861-2, by the expansion of the Yao, who displaced existing inhabitants, and by war and slave raiding, all of which severely disrupted what Livingstone had described as a near-idyllic society. Livingstone was himself at least partly responsible for some of this disruption as, on his Zambezi expedition, he brought with him from Barotseland a number of porters who are usually described as Makololo, and left them near Chikwawa on the Shire River in 1864 when the expedition ended. These men had firearms, and they soon attracted dependents and formed several small chieftaincies along the Shire River.

In the middle of the 19th century, there were several major population movements in Central Africa. One was the Yao migration into what became Nyasaland. The Yao people originally lived south of the Ruvuma River in what is now Mozambique, from where successive Yao groups moved to settle west of Lake Chiuta. The leaders of two major divisions of the Yao there were Malemia and Kawinga: these fought against one another and also against the Ngoni or Angoni, another migrant group. The Ngoni left South Africa in the 1820s under their leader Zwangendaba as part of the great migration called the mfecane, caused at least in part by rise of the Zulu Kingdom. Four Ngoni groups settled in parts of what today is Malawi in the 1850s, and expanded by raiding their neighbours and forcibly incorporating captives into their communities.

In the period after 1860, many people in what is now southern Malawi suffered insecurity because of warfare and slave raiding: this led to the widespread abandonment fertile land. Local chiefs tried to gain protection from European settlers who entered the area by granting them the right to cultivate vacant land, without intending to cede its ownership permanently. One example of this process was when the Rev. Duff MacDonald and John Buchanan, both of Blantyre Mission, met Malemia in August 1879 to request land for a farming outstation of the mission on the Mulunguzi River. The site of this mission station was later occupied by the Government headquarters in Zomba, the colonial capital of Nyasaland. The mission station itself moved to Domasi at the end of the 19th century. From 1878 until 1880, Buchanan worked as an agriculturalist for the mission at Zomba as well as at Blantyre, assisted by a small staff of Africans. He received permission from Malemia to plant coffee seedlings imported from the botanical garden at Edinburgh at Zomba.

=== The Blantyre atrocities ===
In the late 1870s, Blantyre Mission and its outstation were poorly organised. Duff Macdonald, the leading clergyman after 1878, refused to become involved in its daily administration and control was largely exercised by Dr Thomas Macklin and three artisans: John Buchanan (who divided his time between Blantyre and Zomba), John Walker and George Fenwick. An increasing number of robberies at the mission led to arbitrary violence against suspected thieves, which was later called the "Blantyre atrocities". Corporal punishment involved up to 200 lashes from a buffalo hide whip, sometimes with little evidence of wrongdoing. In February and March 1879, one man died after a severe flogging for having thrown away a chest of tea he was ordered to carry and another, accused of murder, was killed in a botched execution by a firing-squad.

Although a small minority within the Church of Scotland attempted to defend Blantyre Mission's actions on the grounds that there was no civil authority to protect it, the prevailing view was that the mission had no legal or moral right to inflict these punishments. However, it was only after the publication of a pamphlet exposing these outrages in early 1880 that the Church's Foreign Mission Committee sent the Rev. James Rankin to Blantyre to investigate charges of inhuman treatment of Africans there. Lord Granville, the Foreign Secretary appointed Alexander Pringle, a lawyer, to accompany Rankin on behalf of the British government. Rankin and Pringle took depositions at Blantyre in September 1880, which Rankin used to prepared a report on the Blantyre cases. This was considered in March 1881 by the Foreign Mission Committee, which concluded that the Rev. Macdonald should be removed for failure to supervise Buchanan and Fenwick, the two workers deemed most responsible for the two deaths and illegal floggings, and that Buchanan and Fenwick should be summarily dismissed.

== Landowning ==
By the time Buchanan was dismissed by the mission in 1881, he had exchanged guns, calico, and some low-value trade goods for a total of 167,823 acres (67,916 ha) of land in the Shire Highlands. His land deals were dubious, as the agreements were signed by chiefs who had no understanding of English concepts of land tenure. This land was acquired in the name of Buchanan Brothers, a partnership of John and his two younger brothers, David and Robert, who joined him in Central Africa in 1881. These land deals were probably made in the expectation that, when more settlers arrived, land prices would rise and some of the land the brothers held could be profitably sold. Buchanan also acted as broker for non-residents wishing to buy land, including Alexander Low Bruce, whose land later formed the A L Bruce Estates. After the establishment of the British Central Africa Protectorate, the Buchanan Brothers' claims were recognised by the colonial administration, which issued Certificates of Claim (in effect the registration of freehold title) for all the separate areas of land they had acquired.

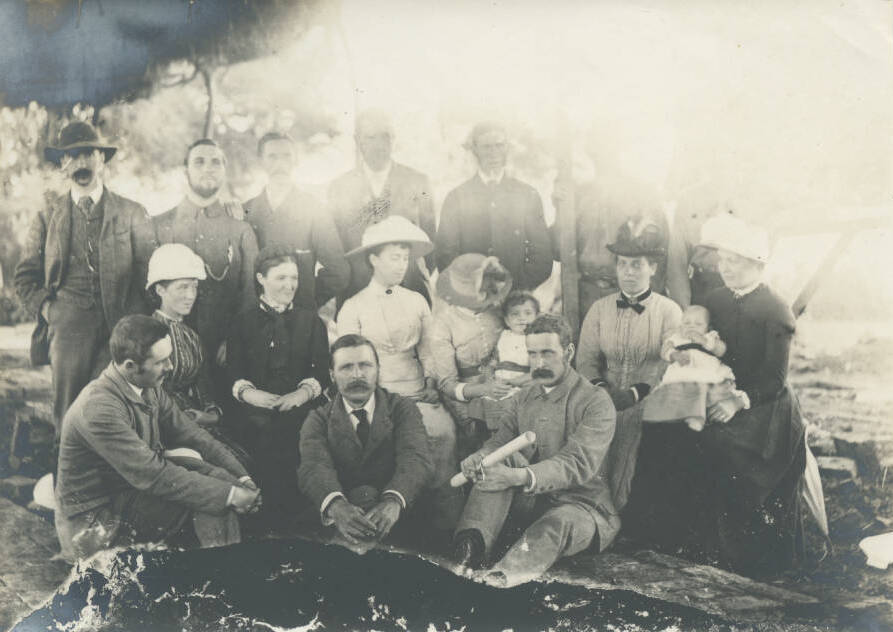
Laying the foundations of Blantyre church in November 1888. Dr. John Bowie is the one standing on the left with a hat. Grace Walker, front left on ground, Harriet Henderson is thought to be the one studying her baby. At the front:Rev. Robt. Cleland, at the centre is John Buchanan, next to him Rev. David Clement Scott then (behind) Janet S. Beck.

The Buchanan Brothers, led by John, experimented with a number of crops, starting with coffee, sugar-cane and tea at Zomba in the early 1890s and they built a sugar mill to produce sugar for the local market. Buchanan himself described progress in coffee planting as slow before the declaration of the protectorate, but he began exporting in 1891, and in 1892–93 about ten million coffee seedlings were planted in the Shire Highlands. The first coffee grown was Coffea arabica but Blue Mountain coffee was also found to be suitable at the heights of about 3,000 feet usual in the highlands. Cultivating coffee as a major crop in Central Africa had a short and disappointing history. In 1896 there were over 10,000 acres under coffee in the Protectorate and 160 tons were exported, gaining high prices in London in 1896 and 1897. However, this coincided with a period of sustained coffee development in Brazil which lowered coffee prices on the world market, and the Nyasaland coffee industry never recovered from this. In early 1890s, Buchanan introduced Virginia-type tobacco. This became the favoured estate crop in drier areas of the Shire Highlands after the failure of coffee, but tobacco growing only developed significantly after the opening of a railway in 1908 to export the crop.

John Buchanan was instrumental in the formation of the Nyasaland Planters Association, which mainly represented the interests of Buchanan Brothers and the African Lakes Company. In 1895, this fused with a rival association to form the British Central Africa Chamber of Agriculture and Commerce, a powerful lobby group for settler interests. John Buchanan was the first Chairman, until his sudden death early in 1896, when he was succeeded by his brother Robert, who died a few months later.

== Administrative career ==
Britain had maintained consuls on the Island of Mozambique since 1856, mainly to monitor and combat the slave trade. Two of these Mozambique-based consuls, Elton in 1877 and O'Neill in 1882, visited the European missions and settlements in the Shire Highlands. O'Neill's visit was made in the aftermath of the Blantyre atrocities, and he recommended that a consul should be appointed for the Lake Nyasa area. The first consul to "the Kings and Chiefs of Central Africa in the territories adjacent to Lake Nyasa", Captain Foot, was appointed in 1883. Foot used Blantyre, where a settlement had begun to grow around the Blantyre Mission, as his headquarters. His successor, Captain Hawes, set up his headquarters at Zomba in 1886, partly because if its nearness to the major slave route running south from Lake Nyasa to the coast, and partly because he disliked the settlers and missionaries of Blantyre. In 1887, the Buchanan Brothers completed a new consulate building on the slopes of Zomba Mountain, near the Mlunguzi stream, for Captain Hawes. This house was later occupied by the early governors of Nyasaland and was known as the Residency.

Buchanan started to construct a Town Hall in Blantyre in 1887. It was finished in 1892. It is known as the Old Town Hall, Victoria Hall or Old Boma.

=== Karonga War ===
The African Lakes Company was established in 1877 as a trading and transport concern to work in close cooperation with the Scottish missions around Lake Nyasa, combating the slave trade by introducing legitimate trade and developing European influence in the area. In 1883, the company opened a depot at Karonga at the north end of Lake Nyasa to exchange ivory gathered by Swahili traders for trade goods Initially, relations between the company and the Swahili traders were cordial, but later deteriorated, partly because of the company’s delays in providing guns, ammunition and other trade goods to pay for the ivory it bought on credit, and also because the Swahili traders turned more to slaving than obtaining ivory. The Swahili traders were forced to wait several months for payment, and they, their workers and guards expected the local Ngonde people to supply them with food, which led to quarrels and eventually to attacks on the Ngonde communities that the company had promised to protect. The Ngonde claimed the protection of the African Lakes Company: this was initially refused but, after fighting in which the Ngonde were defeated and their paramount chief’s village was sacked, many fled to Karonga. Fotheringham, the company's agent at Karonga, claimed that the Swahili wished to drive the Ngonde from their homeland and also intended to attack Karonga, so he strengthened its defences and issued arms, engaging in open warfare against them.

Fotheringham appealed for assistance, and the British Consul at Mozambique, O'Neill, who was outside his area of consular authority, acted on behalf of Hawes, the Consul to the Lake Region, who was absent, by providing armed support for the company. On the return of Consul Hawes from leave, there was a dispute between the two consuls. Hawes wished to discontinue the armed conflict while O'Neill wanted to resume the offensive. O'Neill returned to Mozambique, but Hawes also quarrelled with the African Lakes Company representative, who was supported by most of the European settlers. When hostilities continued in 1887 against his advice, Hawes felt obliged to leave the area although he retained the post of Consul until 1889, and he was later reassigned to Zanzibar. Before Hawes left at the end of 1887, he appointed John Buchanan as Acting Consul. Buchanan remained in this post until the new Consul, Johnson, arrived in 1889, when he became Johnson's assistant Buchanan attempted to negotiate a peaceful settlement with the Arabs in March 1888, but without success. He later refused to authorise Captain Frederick Lugard, who was visiting the area in a hunting trip, to lead a further expedition against them, because this was against the instructions that Hawes had left. Despite Buchanan's refusal to give the expedition official backing, he did not oppose the African Lakes Company, supported by most of the European settlers and the Scottish missionaries, organising a force led by Lugard, which attacked the Arabs at Karonga from May 1888 onwards.

After the arrival of Johnson, who made a treaty with the Swahili to end the conflict in October 1889, he sent his assistant, Buchanan, to Karonga in March 1891 to monitor how its terms were being observed. Buchanan reported to Johnston that the Ngonde were still being driven out, and the Swahili traders were building more fortified villages and restricting the African Lakes Company’s activities. Although Johnson was fully engaged in the south at that time, in 1895 he led a military expedition that led to the destruction of the fortifications and allowing the Ngonde people to return to their home villages.

=== Establishing the Protectorate ===
Although Portugal claimed much of Central Africa on the basis of early exploration, its attempts to negotiate British acceptance of these claims failed. The Portuguese government occupied the lower Shire River valley as far as the Ruo River in 1882, but Britain declined to accept a Portuguese claim that the Shire Highlands should also be treated as part of Portuguese East Africa as it was not under their effective occupation. In 1888, the Portuguese government instructed its representatives in Portuguese East Africa to make treaties of protection with the Yao chiefs southeast of Lake Nyasa and in the Shire Highlands. Two expeditions, one under Antonio Cardosa, a former governor of Quelimane, the second led by Alexandre de Serpa Pinto, the governor of Mozambique set off at the end of 1888. Between them, these two expeditions made over twenty treaties with chiefs in what is now Malawi.

To prevent effective Portuguese occupation of the Shire Highlands, the British government appointed Henry Hamilton Johnston as British consul to Mozambique and the Interior in early 1889, and instructed him to report on the extent of Portuguese rule in the Zambezi and Shire valleys and to make conditional treaties with local rulers beyond Portuguese jurisdiction, to prevent them from accepting protection from Portugal. The Makololo who had remained on the Shire north and west of the Ruo River when Livingstone's Zambezi expedition ended and formed chieftaincies there claimed to be outside Portuguese control. Serpa Pinto's expedition was, in part, a response to a request from the Portuguese resident on the lower Shire for assistance in dealing with disturbances he claimed were caused by the Makololo.

Johnston arrived on the lower Shire River on his way to Blantyre in August 1889. He found Serpa Pinto camped east of the Ruo River in acknowledged Portuguese territory and advised him not to cross the river into the Shire Highlands. When Johnston arrived in the Shire Highlands, Buchanan's post acting for Consul Hawes lapsed. However, Johnston found Buchanan indispensable in the early stages of the administration, particularly as a link with the settlers. Buchanan remained as Vice-Consul and, when Johnston was absent from his headquarters at Zomba, Buchanan was Acting Consul in his place. While he was acting for the absent Johnston, the Makololo asked Buchanan for British assistance, and in his role as Vice-Consul, he accused Portugal of ignoring British interests in this area and formally declared the Makokolo to be under a British protection on 21 September 1889, although this was contrary to his instructions to do no more than prevent local rulers accepting protection from another state.

The Portuguese claims to the Shire Highlands were opposed both by the African Lakes Company and the missionaries. It is likely that members of the British community there encouraged the Makololo to attack Serpa Pinto's camp, which led to a minor battle between Pinto's Portuguese troops and the Makololo on 8 November 1889 near the Shire River. Although Serpa Pinto had previously acted with caution, he then crossed the Ruo and occupied much of Makololo territory. Following this Johnston proclaimed a further protectorate over the districts west of Lake Nyasa. This was contrary to his instructions from the British government, but was endorsed by the Foreign Office in May 1891. Buchanan was made a Companion of Saint Michael and Saint George (C.M.G.) in 1890 for his services as consul.

=== Protectorate Administration ===
Between the British issuing of an Ultimatum to Portugal on 11 January 1890 and the signing of a treaty in Lisbon on 11 June 1891, both Britain and Portugal tried to occupy more of the disputed areas and assert their authority. Buchanan asserted British sovereignty on the Shire Highlands by executing two Portuguese cipais (African soldiers), claiming they were within British jurisdiction. In this period, Johnston began to establish his administration. He had decided to make no appointments before he arrived in Nyasaland, as he believed he would find men there with knowledge of the country and its people, and who were physically and mentally tough. In 1890, he appointed eight political officers, officially entitled "Collectors of Revenue" including John Buchanan, who was also Vice-Consul.

In 1891, Johnston appointed Alfred Sharpe as Vice-Consul in place of Buchanan. Sharpe, who was a solicitor and had acted as a magistrate in Fiji between 1885 and 1886, had come to Central Africa as an elephant hunter and ivory trader in 1887, but had become involved in the African Lakes Company's war against the Arab slave traders. Sharpe had not been appointed as a political officer in 1890, because he was on a mission for Cecil Rhodes to Katanga, but on his return, Johnston chose him over Buchanan on account of his legal training, activity and because, unlike Buchanan, he had no estate to run.

== Legacy ==
At the time of his death, Buchanan was on his way to Europe, but died in March 1896 at Chinde, a port at the mouth of the Zambezi, of a severe fever contracted during the journey down the Zambezi river. David Buchanan had predeceased him in 1892 and Robert died later in 1896. After the deaths of all three Buchanan brothers, a Buchanan Brothers Company was formed to take over assets of their former partnership, and this company was run by a local manager until 1901. Although there were other family members, none were resident in British Central Africa or involved in the business.

John William Moir (1851–1940) was recruited in 1878 as one of the first managers of the African Lakes Company. After he went on leave in March 1890, he was not re-appointed as by the company as its manager. He returned to British Central Africa in 1893, and became a pioneer tea planter. Robert Spence Hynde originally came to Nyasaland in 1888 as a Church of Scotland lay missionary, but soon became a planter. In 1898, John Moir and Robert Hynde incorporated Blantyre and East Africa Ltd, a company registered in Scotland, which in 1901 acquired the estates of the Buchanan Brothers Company. The main activity of Blantyre and East Africa Ltd was the ownership of estates and its main crops were tobacco and tea. Blantyre and East Africa Ltd was one of four large estate-owning companies in colonial Nyasaland.

== See also ==
- African Lakes
- Blantyre and East Africa Ltd

== Sources ==
- C. A. Baker (1962). Nyasaland, The History of its Export Trade, The Nyasaland Journal, Vol. 15, No.1.
- C. A. Baker, (1988). The Genesis of the Nyasaland Civil Service, The Society of Malawi Journal, Vol. 41, No.1.
- R. B. Boeder, (1979) Sir Alfred Sharpe and The Imposition of Colonial Rule On The Northern Ngoni, The Society of Malawi Journal, Vol. 32, No. 1.
- J. Buchanan, (1893). The Industrial Development of Nyasaland, The Geographical Journal, Vol. 1, No. 3.
- J. McCracken, (2008). Politics and Christianity in Malawi, 3rd Edition, African Books Collective, 1875–1940. ISBN 978-99908-87-50-1.
- J. McCracken, (2011). Class, Violence and Gender in Early Colonial Malawi: The Curious Case of Elizabeth Pithie The Society of Malawi Journal, Vol. 64, No. 2.
- J. McCracken, (2012). A History of Malawi, 1859–1966, Woodbridge, James Currey. ISBN 978-1-84701-050-6.
- J. C. Mitchell, (1951). An Outline of the Social Structure of Malemia Area, The Nyasaland Journal, Vol. 4, No. 2.
- M. Newitt, (1995). A History of Mozambique, London, Hurst & Co. ISBN 1-85065-172-8.
- B. Pachai, (1973). Land Policies in Malawi: An Examination of the Colonial Legacy, The Journal of African History Vol. 14.
- B. Pachai, (1978). Land and Politics in Malawi, 1875–1975, Kingston (Ontario), The Limestone Press.
- Perthshire Local Archives http://archiver.rootsweb.ancestry.com/th/read/PERTHSHIRE/2008-03/1205860723
- J G Pike, (1969). Malawi: A Political and Economic History, London, Pall Mall Press.
- W. H. J. Rangeley, (1957) A Brief History of the Tobacco Industry in Nyasaland (Part I), The Nyasaland Journal, Vol. 10, No. 1.
- W. H. J. Rangeley, (1958). The Origins of the Principal Street Names of Blantyre and Limbe, The Nyasaland Journal, Vol. 11, No. 2.
- R. I. Rotberg, (1965). The Rise of Nationalism in Central Africa: The Making of Malawi and Zambia, 1873–1964, Cambridge (Mass), Harvard University Press.
- K. Stahl, (2010). Some Notes on the Development of Zomba, The Society of Malawi Journal, Vol. 63, No. 2.
- J. Watson, (1973). Some Notes on the History of the Zomba District, The Society of Malawi Journal, Vol. 26, No. 1.
- Dix Noonan Webb http://www.dnw.co.uk/medals/auctionarchive/viewspecialcollections/itemdetail.lasso?itemid=56861
- F. M. Withers, (1949). Nyasaland in 1895–96, The Nyasaland Journal, Vol. 2, No. 1.
- F. M. Withers, (1951). Nyasaland's Diamond Jubilee, The Nyasaland Journal, Vol. 4, No. 2.
- Biography in JSTOR Plant Science http://₴.jstor.org/person/bm000036911
- The James Rankin Collection, (1880–81) Special Collections, University of Virginia Library http://ead.lib.virginia.edu/vivaxtf/view?docId=uva-sc/viu03801.xml
- Obituary of John Buchanan, C M G.(1896) The Geographical Journal, Vol. 8, No. 1.
- Oxford Dictionary of National Biography http://www.oxforddnb.com/view/article/94727?&docPos=47&backToResults=
