= Blantyre and East Africa Ltd =

Blantyre and East Africa Ltd is a company that was incorporated in Scotland in 1898 and is still in existence. Its main activity was the ownership of estates in the south of what is now Malawi. The main estate crops it grew were tobacco until the 1950s and tea, which it continued to grow until the company’s tea estates were sold.

Blantyre and East Africa Ltd was one of four large estate-owning companies in colonial Nyasaland which together owned over 3,400,000 acres (1,400,000 ha) of land, including the majority of the fertile land in the Shire Highlands. The company acquired most of its landholdings between 1898 and 1901 from several early European settlers, whose title to this land had been recognised by Certificates of Claim issued by the administration of the British Central Africa Protectorate.

After the boom in Europeans growing tobacco ended around 1927, the company retained a single large estate in Zomba District where its tenants were encouraged to grow tobacco, and others where it grew tea. It also rented out a scattering of small estates to African tenants, which were crowded and unsupervised. Many such estates, apart from the tea estates which it continued to manage directly, were sold to the colonial administration of Nyasaland between 1950 and 1955.

== Corporate history ==
Blantyre and East Africa Ltd is a company registered in Scotland number SC004070 which was incorporated in 1898 as a private company. The company still exists and has throughout its existence had its registered office in Scotland, although it has not traded since 1995.

The company was founded in 1898 a group of largely Scottish landowners headed by John William Moir and Robert Spence Hynde (both from Edinburgh), and it acquired the estates formerly owned by the three Buchanan brothers in 1901. Moir and John Buchanan were among the earliest European settlers in what is now Malawi, both arriving in the 1870s. Hynde and the other Buchanan brothers arrived in the 1880s, but all were present before the British Central Africa Protectorate was proclaimed in 1891. All these men had a Scottish background and had cooperated in forming the Nyasaland Planters Association.

The main trading operations if Blantyre and East Africa Ltd were carried out in what is now Malawi where it owned large estates, whose main products were tobacco and tea, through the first half of the 20th century. During the 1950s it sold many of its tobacco estates to the colonial administration of Nyasaland but retained its tea estates until after independence. The company has been referred to as Blantyre and East Africa Company Ltd, but according to its corporate records, it has never changed its name and has always been Blantyre and East Africa Ltd.

== Predecessors ==
John Buchanan (1855–96) was first apprenticed to a gardener at Drummond Castle. He was one of the original employees of the Blantyre Church of Scotland Mission when it was founded in 1876, working as a gardener, and in 1878 moved to open an outstation of the mission on the Mulunguzi River, which became the site of Zomba, the capital of Nyasaland. He was dismissed by the mission in 1881 for brutality, but by this time he had exchanged low-value trade goods for around 170,000 acres of land. This land was acquired in the name of Buchanan Brothers, a partnership of him and his two younger brothers David and Robert, who joined him in Central Africa in 1881. These land deals were probably made in the expectation that, with more settlers, land prices would rise. Buchanan also acted as broker for non-residents wishing to buy land, including Alexander Low Bruce, whose land formed the A L Bruce Estates. Buchanan Brothers experimented with a number of crops starting with coffee, which was being exported by 1891. In early 1890s, they had introduced Virginia-type tobacco, planted an experimental tea garden and built a sugar mill to produce sugar for the local market. From being a disgraced missionary, John Buchanan became Acting British Consul to Central Africa from 1887 to 1891, and in that capacity declared a protectorate over the Shire Highlands in 1889 to pre-empt a Portuguese expedition that intended to claim sovereignty in that region. In 1891, this became part of the British Central Africa Protectorate. In 1892, he helped to form the Nyasaland Planters Association, which mainly represented the interests of Buchanan Brothers and the African Lakes Company. In 1895, this fused with a rival association to form the British Central Africa Chamber of Agriculture and Commerce, a powerful lobby group for settler interests. John Buchanan was the first Chairman, but he died suddenly early in 1896 and was succeeded by his brother Robert, who died a few months later. David Buchanan had already died in 1892. There were other family members, but none were resident in British Central Africa or involved in the business. After the deaths of the three Buchanan brothers, the Buchanan Brothers Company was formed to take over the partnership assets, and it was run by a local manager until 1901.

John William Moir (1851-1940) and his brother Frederick Moir (1852–1939) were recruited in 1878 as the first managers of the company known from 1881 as the African Lakes Company and as the African Lakes Corporation from 1894. On their arrival in Central Africa, they became involved in elephant hunting and ivory trading as ivory was the only commodity that it was economical to ship to Europe. John left Africa in March 1890 and was not re-appointed as manager. Frederick Moir left in June 1891, and was made secretary of African Lakes in Glasgow. John Moir returned to Nyasaland (then British Central Africa) in 1893 and became a pioneer tea planter, founding the Lauderdale estate in the Mlanje district; he retired to Edinburgh in 1900. R S Hynde originally came to Nyasaland in 1888 as a Church of Scotland lay missionary, but soon became a planter and from 1901 to 1918 was the General Manager of Blantyre and East Africa Ltd, remaining in Nyasaland for many years after this. He was particularly interested in tea planting.

The Buchanan Brothers partnership had been awarded title to 167,823 acres in three large and four smaller estates, all in the Shire Highlands, in 1893. John Moir had acquired 13,803 acres from the African Lakes Company on his return to British Central Africa in 1893 and both Moir and Hynde had made subsequent land purchases. However, there had also been sales and Blantyre and East Africa Ltd owned around 157,000 acres of land in 1901 which it had acquired from these predecessors.

== Business operations in Nyasaland ==
Buchanan Brothers had experimented with coffee, sugar-cane and tea at Zomba in the 1890s. John Moir had planted tea on the Lauderdale Estate in Mlanje from 1891, and R S Hynde started as a tobacco and coffee planter, but soon replaced coffee with tea on his estate near Limbe. These crops continued to be grown by the company, but competition and overproduction in Brazil led to the abandonment of coffee by 1905. Tea was found to be more suited to the wetter Cholo and Mlanje districts, whereas in the drier areas of the Shire Highlands tobacco was the favoured estate crop. Both tobacco and tea growing developed significantly after the opening of the Shire Highlands Railway in 1908.

In the years shortly after the protectorate was founded in 1891, little of the land on European estates was planted, as few African workers were resident on estate lands at that time. Many of the Certificates of Claim issued to settlers contained “non-disturbance” clauses allowing these existing residents to continue to cultivate their existing fields rent-free Many of the new workers who moved onto estates were so-called "Anguru", migrants from Mozambique who were required to pay rent, usually satisfied by two months’ labour a year in the early years, under the system known as thangata although later many owners required a longer period of work. R S Hynde, the General Manager of Blantyre and East Africa Ltd, made an agreement with the headmen of villages on the company's estates in Cholo District under which the villagers were to give up their rights under the non-disturbance clause and become the company’s tenants, working for two months during the growing season in lieu of rent and Hut tax. If any of the villagers worked for another employer they were to pay their rent and taxes in cash, and those who could not work for it or pay rent were to be liable to be evicted. In 1903, the administration asked the High Court to cancel this agreement, as it contravened the non-disturbance clause. The court accepted that the villagers’ rights protected by the non-disturbance clause could not be exchanged for an insecure tenancy under an illegal thangata agreement.

Following this check to its attempt to create a workforce that would enable it to exploit its estates directly, Blantyre and East Africa Ltd explored alternative methods of utilising its land. The company did continue to grow tea and some tobacco using the direct labour of tenants under the thangata system or by wage labour. The tobacco produced by direct labour was Flue-cured tobacco, which was cured in brick barns by hot air conducted through metal flues, without smoke coming into contact with the leaf. Its final colour was yellowish brown and it was normally used for cigarettes or as pipe tobacco. This became a significant export for the company from 1907. Although in 1901 it had owned 157,000 acres, the company’s first alternative strategy was to sell or lease some of its land, particularly after the First World War to small planters, which reduced this to 119,500 acres by 1925. Most of the sales and leases were in Blantyre District, the most developed part of the protectorate. Secondly, on its smaller remaining estates in the Shire Highlands and beyond, it ceased to provide supervision but sought to obtain cash rents from African tenants, as it had no need for their labour. Finally, on its largest remaining estate in Zomba District, Blantyre and East Africa Ltd pioneered African tobacco production from 1901. This was of fire-cured tobacco, also known as dark-fired tobacco, which is cured over open fires, so the leaf absorbs various flavours from the smoke, and substantial acreages were set aside for tobacco growing by African tenants. At first, success was limited, but from 1916, the company increased African production by allocating land, supplying seed, giving instruction and providing suitable storage barns for its tenants. The tobacco they produced is described as of good saleable quality.

In 1918, R S Hynde retired, and was replaced as General Manager by another Scot, W Tait Bowie, who was General Manager of Blantyre and East Africa Ltd from 1918 to 1946 when he retired aged 70 and was appointed to its Board of Directors. Although the First World War boosted production of estate grown, flue-cured Virginia tobacco, post-war competition from the United States Virginia made the low-grade tobacco produced by many European growers in Nyasaland unsalable and by 1925 the high cost of flue-curing and overproduction led to reduced sale prices making flue-cured tobacco unprofitable.

This major slump in flue-cured tobacco production did not affect fire-cured tobacco, and Blantyre and East Africa Ltd stepped up production on their estates. However, there was increasing competition from African growers outside the estates on Crown land. To counter this competition, in the 1920s Tait Bowie, the company's General Manager, advocated that African smallholders were registered and that they should grow no more than half as acre of tobacco to reduce their output. Bowie wanted to ensure that the development of smallholder agriculture did not reduce the availability of labour on estates, and that estate owners would benefit fully from re-selling the tobacco that their tenants grew on parts of their estates.

As the demand for direct labour on tobacco estates declined with collapse in the market for flue-cured tobacco, the estate owners claimed that they had insufficient work for their labour tenants to meet their obligations under the thangata system and that they had become rent-free squatters who should be liable to be evicted. The owners also complained of the significant numbers resident on their estate who paid no rent under non-disturbance clauses. To meet some of the estate owners’ demands but also give some protection to tenants the protectorate government introduced the Natives on Private Estates Ordinance 1928, which abolishing all rights under non-disturbance clauses, but gave tenants tenancies with a five-year term and with maximum rents fixed by District Rent Boards. Rents could be satisfied in cash, by labour or by selling economic crops to the owner. Blantyre and East Africa Ltd accepted tobacco in lieu of cash rents on some estates but others had become crowded and during the 1930s it obtained cash rents from subsistence farmers on these instead. The company ceased direct operations on its estates in Zomba and Chiradzulu districts, and in 1929 there were no Europeans resident on its estates in those districts, only an agent living in Zomba who visited them periodically.

Although tea had been exported since 1904, the real growth of the tea industry in Cholo and Mlanje districts occurred after 1922 and was promoted by the collapse the Flue-cured tobacco market. The estate companies including Blantyre and East Africa Ltd owned land that they needed to put into productive use, and chose tea planting. Even by the very poor standards of southern Africa, Nyasaland's tea wages in the 1920s and 1930s were low. The tea growers argued that the quality of the tea produced and the productivity of the workers were both also low. On the three Blantyre and East Africa estates in Mlanje (Lauderdale, Glenorchy and Limbuli), workers were paid a basic wage of 6 shillings, or 30 pence in 1941 and a bonus for large amounts picked. These very low wages caused incidents on the Limbuli Estate in 1942, where the manager was censured for his behaviour towards tenants. Very few women worked at picking tea until the early 1970s but in 1973 at Glenorchy women picked approximately 2/5 of the crop. There were major slumps the world tea industry in 1919-20 and 1928-32 as more efficient planting and expansion in the areas planted created a “tea mountain”. In 1933 an International Tea Agreement scheme introduced export quotas and virtually prohibited new areas of tea planting and the selling or leasing of further land for tea growing. The Blantyre and East Africa estates were allowed to grow 2,964 acres of tea in 1939 and 3,810 acres in 1945, about 17% of total area if tea planted in Cholo and Mlanje districts in 1935, reducing to 13% in 1945. R Palmer, (1985).

In 1947, Blantyre and East Africa Ltd still owned 111,529 acres of land, but none of the 47,258 acres it owned in the Blantyre, Chikwawa and Chiradzulu districts were directly worked by the company. These were the former tobacco estates. From 1947, the Nyasaland government negotiated for the acquisition of the under-utilised parts of the company’s estates. In 1950, Blantyre & East Africa Ltd sold four of its estates of around 20,000 acres to the government for re-settlement, and there were subsequent sales in 1955. By the time Nyasaland became independent as Malawi in 1964, the company had sold its former tobacco estates, but it still retained and operated its tea estates. The General Manager in the 1980s was Andrew Stark, a descendant of R R Stark, one of the founder shareholders. In 1991, Blantyre and East Africa Ltd still owned its Lauderdale, Limbuli, Eldorado, Pwazi River and Glenorchy tea estates, but by 2003, Eastern Produce Malawi Ltd had taken over their ownership. The dates of this transfer are unclear, but must pre-date the end of trading in 1995 - probably 1994..

== Sources ==
- B Pachai, (1978). Land and Politics in Malawi 1875-1975, Kingston (Ontario), The Limestone Press
- M Vaughan (1987). The Story of an African Famine: Gender and Famine in Twentieth-Century Malawi, Cambridge University Press.
- C Baker, (1993). Seeds of Trouble: Government Policy and Land Rights in Nyasaland, 1946-1964, London, British Academic Press pp. 88–9, 135.
- Company information from Open Corporates. http://opencorporates.com/companies/gb/SC004070/filings
- W. H. J. Rangeley, (1958). The Origins of the Principal Street Names of Blantyre and Limbe, The Nyasaland Journal, Vol. 11, No. 2, pp. 41–54
- J McCarthy, (2004). Connecting the Lakes: Two Scottish Pioneers, The Society of Malawi Journal, Vol. 57, No. 2 pp. 1–11
- J McCraken, (2012). A History of Malawi, 1859-1966 Woodbridge, James Currey. ISBN 978-1-84701-050-6
- Biography in JSTOR Plant Science http://plants.jstor.org/person/bm000036911
- F M Withers, (1949). Nyasaland in 1895–96, The Nyasaland Journal, Vol. 2, No. 1, pp. 16–34
- W H J Rangeley, (1957) A Brief History of the Tobacco Industry in Nyasaland (Part I), The Nyasaland Journal, Vol. 10, No. 1, pp. 62–83.
- Oxford Dictionary of National Biography, John William Moir. http://www.oxforddnb.com/view/article/94727?&docPos=47&backToResults
- UK Government, (1938). Report of the Commission appointed to enquire into the Financial Position and Further Development of Nyasaland, 1937, London, HMSO.
- A. Schwarz and R. S. Hynde (1983). Malawi's First Newspaper, the Central African Planter, The Society of Malawi Journal, Vol. 36, No. 2, pp. 10–11.
- J G Pike, (1969). Malawi: A Political and Economic History, London, Pall Mall Press.
- J. A. K. Kandawire, (1977). Thangata in Pre-Colonial and Colonial Systems of Land Tenure in Southern Malawi, with Special Reference to Chingale, Africa: Journal of the International African Institute, Vol. 47, No. 2, pp. 185–917.
- R. I. Rotberg, (1965). The Rise of Nationalism in Central Africa : The Making of Malawi and Zambia, 1873-1964, Cambridge (Mass), Harvard University Press.
- L White, (1987). Magomero: Portrait of an African Village, Cambridge University Press pp. 86–9, ISBN 0-521-32182-4
- Clement Ng'ong'ola (1990). The State, Settlers, and Indigenes in the Evolution of Land Law and Policy in Colonial Malawi, The International Journal of African Historical Studies, Vol. 23, No. 1 (1990), pp. 27–58.
- Obituary of Sir William Tait Bowie, (1949), The Nyasaland Journal, Vol. 2, No. 2, pp. 58–59.
- R Palmer, (1985). White Farmers in Malawi: Before and After the Depression” African Affairs Vol. 84 No.335 pp. 211–45.
- W H J Rangeley, (1957) A Brief History of the Tobacco Industry in Nyasaland (Part II), The Nyasaland Journal, Vol. 10, No. 2, pp. 32–51.
- J McCracken, (1983) Planters, peasants and the colonial state: the impact of the Native Tobacco Board in the Central Province of Malawi,” Journal of Southern African Studies Vol. 9, No. 2, pp. 172–192.
- C. A. Baker (1962) Nyasaland, The History of its Export Trade, The Nyasaland Journal, Vol. 15, No.1, pp. 7–55.
- C Matthews and W E Lardner Jennings, (1947). The Laws of Nyasaland, Volume 1, London 1947, Crown Agents for the Colonies.
- R Palmer, (1986). Working conditions and worker responses on Nyasaland tea estates, 1930-1953, Journal of African History, Vol. 27, No. 1, pp. 105–26
- R Palmer, (1985). The Nyasaland Tea Industry in the Era of International Tea Restrictions, 1933-1950, Journal of African History, Vol. 26, No. 2, pp. 215–239.
- The Tea Association of Malawi Limited, (1991). A Handbook to the Tea Industry of Malawi, Lilongwe, Central Africana Ltd.
- L Eldring (2003) Child Labour in the Tea Sector in Malawi Oslo, Fafo. http://www.fafo.no/pub/rapp/714/714.pdf
