= Alfred Sharpe =

British colonial governor

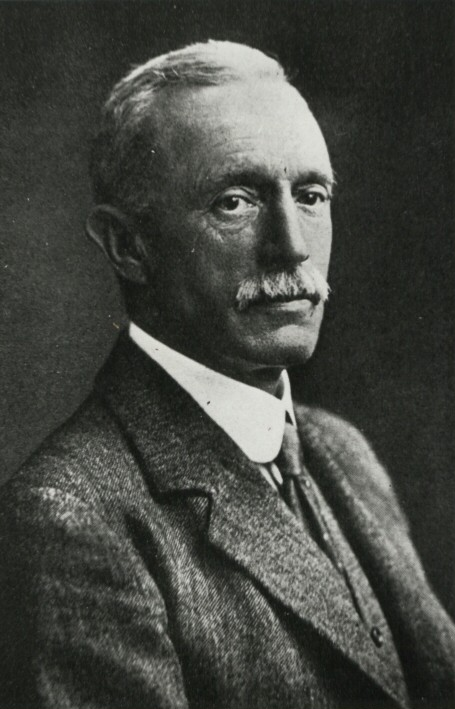
Alfred Sharpe

Sir Alfred Sharpe KCMG CB (19 May 1853 – 10 December 1935) was Commissioner and Consul-General for the British Central Africa Protectorate and first Governor of Nyasaland.

He trained as a solicitor but was in turn a planter and a professional hunter before becoming a British colonial administrator. He was commissioner (a de facto governor) of the British Central Africa Protectorate from 1896 until 1907 and Governor of Nyasaland after the protectorate changed its name to Nyasaland in 1907 until his retirement in 1910. He was involved in some of the events which shaped south-Central Africa at the onset of colonialism.

== Background and early career ==
Sharpe was born on 19 May 1853 at Lancaster, Lancashire, England to parents Edmund Sharpe and Elizabeth Sharpe. During his childhood his family moved from Lancaster, first to Wales and then to Switzerland and France as his father was a railway engineer, involved in railway construction in those countries. Sharpe was educated at Haileybury and Imperial Service College, near Hertford and trained with a private firm of solicitors, qualifying as a solicitor at age twenty-three. In 1883, he travelled with a cousin to Viti Levu, the largest island of Fiji, to start a sugar plantation. Their plantation venture failed within a year, as the cousins had no experience in tropical agriculture and because sugar prices were low. Sharpe started his administrative career in Fiji with a brief period as an acting stipendiary magistrate there in 1885–1886. He was offered the position of a district officer in Fiji, but he refused and then left for Central Africa. Sharpe was a Fellow of the Royal Geographical Society (RGS), 1891–1935; RGS Cuthbert Peek Award, 1898; Member of the Council of the RGS, 1913–1917.

Sharpe went to the Shire Highlands, south of Lake Nyasa, in 1887 to hunt elephants and trade in ivory but almost immediately became involved in the war between the African Lakes Company and Arab slave traders, mostly fought around Karonga at the north end of Lake Nyasa. Henry Hamilton Johnston was appointed as British consul to Mozambique and the Interior in early 1889, and was instructed to report on the extent of Portuguese rule in the Zambezi and Shire River valleys, and to prevent local rulers beyond the existing Portuguese jurisdiction from accepting Portuguese protection. Both Johnston and his vice-consul, John Buchanan, exceeded their instructions and declared British protectorates, firstly over the Shire Highlands and then over the area west of Lake Nyasa, both in 1889. The British Central Africa protectorate came into existence in 1891 when Johnston's actions were endorsed by the British government.

== The scramble for Katanga ==
In 1890 Sharpe was employed jointly by imperialist Cecil Rhodes and the British Consul in Nyasaland, Harry Johnston, on a mission to Msiri, King of Garanganza (mineral- and game-rich Katanga), which Europeans considered very remote. Rhodes wanted a mineral rights concession for his British South Africa Company (BSAC) and Johnston wanted Msiri to accept a treaty creating a British protectorate over his kingdom. The BSAC had already occupied part of North-Western Rhodesia and this would extend their territory further north. Katanga was known to have copper and was thought to have gold.

Only a handful of Europeans had been to Katanga and the Luapula/Lake Mweru region. The first to live there, Frederick Arnot, had taken up residence at Msiri's capital only three years previously. There had been no change to the methods and equipment for mounting an expedition since the explorer David Livingstone's travels twenty years before.

=== Sharpe reaches Kazembe's ===
Rhodes and Johnston also wanted the same agreements with Mwata Kazembe and Chief Nsama, the other strong chiefs in the area, to the east of Msiri. Sharpe was in competition with Belgian King Leopold II's Congo Free State (CFS) which had already tried sending expeditions to Msiri. Sharpe was successful with Nsama and Mwata Kazembe but the latter was opposed to him going on to do a deal with his enemy, Msiri, and he delayed Sharpe by trickery and encouraged his porters to abscond. Mwata Kazembe's kingdom bordered what had been Msiri's on the other side of the Luapula River; originally that had been Mwata Kazembe's territory as well, but Msiri had usurped it.

=== On to Msiri's ===
Without his retinue, and low on cash and supplies such as cloth and gunpowder traditionally used to open negotiations, Sharpe, with just a couple of servants, eventually arrived at Msiri's court at Bunkeya with the draft treaty, and would not have cut an imposing figure. The explorer Joseph Thomson, also working for BSAC, was supposed to come up from the south and meet him at Msiri's with supplies and goods, but he did not arrive because of a smallpox epidemic in the country in between; Sharpe had to do his best on his own. Msiri and his court could not read English and Sharpe described the treaty favourably; when its real content was revealed to Msiri at the urging of Charles Swan, a British missionary at the court, Msiri, enraged, sent Sharpe away empty-handed. He was not aware he was in a race with the CFS, and left in disgust, blaming Swan.

=== Returns to Lake Tanganyika ===
On the other hand, Sharpe felt satisfied with the Kazembe and Nsama agreements in his pocket. He wrote to Johnston from Bunkeya on 15 November 1890 saying there was no fear of Msiri giving concessions or treaties to anyone else, and in any case if they sent a well-armed column of perhaps 150 men to Katanga they could take over Msiri's copper and mineral trade without hindrance. On 26 December 1890 he wrote to Johnston again from Lake Tanganyika saying that Msiri would not last long and they could then acquire 'all his country'. Furthermore, he noted that as Kazembe was the rightful owner of Msiri's country, the Kazembe treaty effectively gave them all the 'Lunda country' (by which he included Msiri's territory comprising the south-east of present-day Katanga).

As it turned out, although Sharpe was right on the first point − a small force could take over Msiri's mineral wealth − he was wrong on the next two points. On 18 April 1891 a Belgian expedition arrived led by Paul Le Marinel. He obtained a letter signed by Msiri and witnessed by Swan, that Msiri would accept CFS personnel in his territory.

Later that year a large, well-equipped and well-armed Congo Free State 'pacification' force arrived led by a Canadian mercenary, Captain W. E. Stairs, with orders to take Katanga under its control. On 20 December 1891 the CFS expedition shot Msiri, massacred his people and took possession of the country, which became part of the Congo.

== Nyasaland Administration ==
Sharpe was actively engaged in the formation of the British Central Africa Protectorate and played a leading role in the establishment of British rule in the region. In 1891 Johnston appointed Alfred Sharpe as vice-consul on account of his legal training and activity and because, unlike the former vice-consul, he was not a landowner with an estate to run. In 1893, Johnston's title became that of Commissioner, and Sharpe was appointed Deputy Commissioner, taking over as Acting Commissioner in Johnston's absences. When Johnston left British Central Africa in 1896, Sharpe was at first Acting Commissioner but was confirmed in the post of Commissioner in 1897. In January 1902 he was appointed Commissioner, Commander-in-Chief and Consul-General for the British Central Africa Protectorate. He became the first governor when the territory was renamed the Nyasaland Protectorate in 1907, and left in 1910. During Sharpe's career as a colonial administrator from 1891 to 1910, he helped defeat slave raiders and traders, established rules for the settlement of land claims, and generally laid the administrative groundwork for Nyasaland's early colonial history. He also attempted to develop viable cash crops and to promote the protectorate's agricultural economy, with only limited success. Although he had reasonable relations with the European settlers, he fought against the development of business monopolies and encouraged planters to give better wages and conditions to African workers. His father's railway building in Britain, France and Switzerland encouraged Sharpe to promote and guide the construction of the first railway from Nsanje to Limbe, which opened in 1908. He was also responsible for building Nyasaland's central north–south highway.

=== Administration ===
In 1896, Johnston and Sharpe set up a small government Secretariat (administrative office) in Zomba which formed the nucleus of Sharpe's central administration. After Sharpe succeeded as Commissioner, he appointed several legal and technical advisors to strengthen this administration. Johnston had appointed a dozen district officers, called "Collectors of Revenue", and Sharpe increased the number of district officials to 27 in 1897 and 38 in 1905 by providing assistants for the Collectors. He made no attempt to integrate local rulers into the system of local administration, and their existing powers were minimised in favour of direct rule by the district officers. Just before his retirement in 1910, Sharpe accepted the settlers’ arguments that the government should not appoint officially recognised Village headmen as intermediaries between villagers and the local district officers, but these were appointed from 1912 onward by his successor as governor.

=== The Land Settlement ===
In the third quarter of the 19th century, southern Malawi suffered from warfare and slave raiding, which led to the abandonment of fertile land. Local chiefs sought protection from Europeans who had entered the area from the 1860s onwards by granting them the right to cultivate this vacant land. The African Lakes Company was formed in 1877 to co-operate with the missions in Central Africa by combating the slave trade and introducing legitimate trade. Its local agents claimed to have made treaties or agreements with several chiefs granting the company large amounts of land. Three individuals, Eugene Sharrer, John Buchanan and Alexander Low Bruce, the son-in-law of David Livingstone and a director of the African Lakes Company also claimed to have purchased large areas of land, often for trivial quantities of goods, under agreements signed by chiefs who had no understanding of English concepts of land tenure.

This left Harry Johnston, the Commissioner of the protectorate, with a major problem. He did not consider that the government had any general claim to ownership of land in the protectorate, and he believed that the land belonged to its African communities, so their chiefs had no right to alienate it to anyone. However, he also accepted that the agreements the chiefs had made with Europeans might be regarded as evidence of land sales. To solve this dilemma, he put forward the legal fiction that each chief's people had tacitly accepted that he could assume the right to sell vacant land not currently being used by the community. He also claimed that he was entitled to investigate if these sales were valid and, if they were, to issue Certificates of Claim (a registration of freehold title) to the land to the new owners.

After the proclamation of the protectorate, there had been a wholesale land grab, with huge areas of land bought for trivial sums and subject to overlapping claims that required adjustment. His review of land claims begun in late 1892, and as Johnston had no legal training, he relied heavily on Sharpe, as the protectorate did not have any law officers until 1896. Sharpe and Johnston questioned the chiefs named in agreements to confirm they had agreed to sell the land. They also tried to ensure that a fair price had been paid, but they placed very low values on the land, from a halfpenny an acre for indifferent land up to a maximum of threepence an acre for the most fertile areas. Most Certificates of Claim included a non-disturbance clause providing that existing African villages and farms were not to be removed or disturbed without consent from the protectorate government.

When the legality of the Certificates of Claim system was challenged in 1903 on the basis that the agreements made by the chiefs breached the rights of their community members, the Appeals Court upheld the validity of the certificates, but considered that many of the agreements were unfair and one-sided.

=== Punitive expedition against Mwata Kazembe ===
When Sharpe succeeded Johnston as the British Commissioner in Nyasaland, he also had responsibility for enforcing security in the neighbouring BSAC charter territory, North-Eastern Rhodesia, which he had helped establish with the Kazembe and Nsama treaties, among others. Ignoring the terms of the agreement he had signed with Sharpe, in 1897 Mwata Kazembe X refused to co-operate with the newly arrived BSAC tax collector Blair Watson, refused to let him fly the British flag, and when Watson marched on Mwata Kazembe's capital, defeated his troops.

Mwata Kazembe was 1000 km from Sharpe's base at Blantyre over some difficult terrain and it was not until 1899 that Sharpe could mount a military expedition with Sikh and Nyasaland troops operating in conjunction with Robert Codrington, acting BSAC Administrator of North-Eastern Rhodesia. Mwata Kazembe escaped across the Luapula and after missionaries interceded on his behalf, he was allowed to return to a chieftainship recognised by the BSAC which became reasonably successful. See article on Kazembe for more details.

=== Labour and Taxation ===
To force Africans to work for wages on European plantations, Johnston had instituted an annual Hut tax at the rate of three shillings (15 pence). In 1902 Sharpe bowed to pressure from settlers to double the rate to six shillings. This was however subject to a three shilling reduction for those who worked for 30 days for a European, with the aim of directing more Africans to work in European-run estates. In 1901, Sharpe had opposed the organised recruitment of migrant labour for the mines in South Africa and Rhodesia, as this was also opposed by settler agricultural interests. However, by 1903 the Transvaal mines were very short of workers, and Lord Milner, the governor of the Transvaal, exerted pressure on Joseph Chamberlain, the Colonial Secretary, to permit recruitment in British territories north of the Zambezi. This, together with a severe famine in the far south of the protectorate and the continued failure of the planters to find a suitable export crop, led Sharpe, who had once strongly supported estate agriculture, to give consent for the Witwatersrand Native Labour Association (WNLA) to recruit 1,000 workers for the Transvaal mines in Nyasaland. By 1907, 1,500 Nyasaland workers a year were being recruited for the Transvaal mines, and in 1908 Rhodesia Native Labour Board (RNLB) also began recruiting workers. However, in 1910, following the opening of a railway which offered better prospects for exporters and protests from settlers about labour shortages, Sharpe ended the agreements with WNLA and RNLB. In 1910, Sharpe also introduced measures to regulate the employment of Africans working for European settlers and limit abuses, but these were largely ignored.

=== The Maseko Ngoni ===
Sharpe was involved in the last major military episode of the colonial conquest of the protectorate. After the Arab and Yao slave traders at Karonga had been overcome by the first Commissioner of the British Central Africa Protectorate, Harry Johnston between 1891 and 1895, the most important organised state in the south of the protectorate was the Maseko Ngoni kingdom based near Dedza which, before the protectorate was proclaimed, had raided widely in the Shire Highlands. After 1893, relations between the Gomani, the new young Ngoni leader, and the protectorate administration worsened. In 1895, Gomani ordered his people not to pay the Hut tax, which Johnston had imposed. He also began harassing the missionaries in his vicinity, which led to exaggerated reports of widespread violence. In Johnston's absence, Sharpe as Acting Commissioner ordered troops to attack the Ngoni in October 1896. After a brief skirmish, the Ngoni fighters were dispersed and Gomani was captured and shot. A heavy punitive fine in cattle was imposed, which impoverished the Ngoni and forced many of their young men to become migrant workers. Gomani had attempted to prevent his people taking up work with settlers in the Shire Highlands, but his defeat laid them open to labour recruiters.

=== The Northern Ngoni ===
One of Sharpe's most notable administrative achievements was bringing the Northern Ngoni under governmental control without resorting to excessive force. As late as 1902, Sharpe was prepared to use coercion rather than persuasion when he sent troops to Chintheche when local people protested against the introduction of the six shilling rate of Hut tax, and forced a number of the protesters to undertake unpaid work for the government as a punishment.

The Ngoni had settled in northern Nyasaland in the early 1850s and brought the local peoples under their control. From the late 1870s, the Ngoni there had contact with Free Church of Scotland missionaries. Robert Laws first met the Ngoni Chief Mbelwa (referred to as Mombera in early writings) in 1879, and in 1881 he established Livingstonia Mission at Bandawe in the northwestern of Lake Nyasa. Over a period of years, Laws persuaded the Ngoni leader to cease raiding and the missionaries established themselves in his kingdom as educators and arbitrators in disputes. In 1885, a mission school was opened at Ekwendeni in the heart of Ngoniland. By 1899, there were favourable signs that the Ngoni were ready to come under the control of the protectorate administration. Dr. Laws advised Sharpe to be cautious and to manage the transfer of power with tact and dignity. Sharpe agreed to leave the timing of imposition of administrative control to Laws: in 1904, after a severe famine in 1903, the time seemed right. At a ceremony at Ekwendeni in October 1904, the Ngoni leaders agreed to submit themselves to British rule, to accept a resident administrator and to pay taxes from 1906. However, Sharpe allowed the Ngoni a measure of self-government under a paramount chief, and this continued for several years after his departure. Sharpe's agreement with Mbelwa in 1904 showed that he now accepted that the consent of the people governed could not be ignored. Before Sharpe extended the Hut tax to Mbelwa's kingdom, he noted that almost no Ngoni from that area went to the Shire Highlands as seasonal workers, but after many went not only to the Shire Highlands, but also to Rhodesia and even South Africa.

At the time of Queen Victoria's Diamond Jubilee in 1897, Sharpe was made a Companion of the Order of the Bath (CB) and in 1903 was created a Knight Commander of the Order of St Michael and St George (K.C.M.G). He retired to Britain where he wrote and lectured on Central Africa in his retirement, and also travelled extensively in Africa. He died on 10 December 1935, in London

== Descendants left in Zambia ==
Alfred Sharpe's eldest son, Edmund, was born in Levuka, Fiji in 1882. Edmund moved with his father to Nyasaland. Edmund worked in the Colonial Service in North Eastern Rhodesia.

While on tour collecting taxes, Edmund Sharpe witnessed the initiation ceremony for Chief Jumbe's eldest daughter, Veronica Chulu. He asked the chief for permission to marry Veronica. They had five sons named Harrison Philip, Jack, John, Jimmy and Thomas, and a daughter named Jane.

Philip married Katie Thornicroft and had sons, Frank, Alfred, George and Stanley, and daughters Rosemary and Muriel. Alfred lives in England, daughter Jennifer lives in Thailand and daughter Susan lives in South Africa with husband Roderick. George lives in the Isle of Man, married to Cecilia and has three daughters, Louise, Karen and Natalie. George has as an older son Keith who also lives on the Isle of Man with wife Madina, they have 3 children Rheyan (California, USA) Amaara & Aziz, Keith also has another son Ryan who lives in New Zealand. George also has a daughter Nicola who lives in Zambia with husband Guy Phiri and children Kyle, Mia and Jade. Stanley lives in Australia, married to Audrey, with two daughters Antoinette and Allison also living in Australia with their families. Rosemary is widowed and lives in Southampton, she has two sons Raymond and Philip and a daughter Maria. Muriel lives in Germany with husband Lothar, their daughter Tanja lives in France. This information is current at 2017.

Thomas Sharpe was born on 29 March 1921 under British passport number 16994. He fathered two sons with Peggy McMillan. These sons were Ronald Cedric Sharpe (born 28 July 1945 in Ndola and died in 1988 at the age of 43 in Luxor, Egypt) and Jimmy Gerard Sharpe. Ronald (deceased) had two sons: one living in Australia named Daniel Sharpe. Daniel's mother was Heather Young, sister of (Ike) Eisenhower Thornicroft, Lusaka, Zambia. Ronald's second son lived in Zambia (Nigel Leander Cedric Sharpe - deceased). Nigel left three daughters: Lisa Rochelle Sharpe, Amelia Grace Lafayette Sharpe and Amanda Sharpe. Ronald Cedric Sharpe also left two daughters (Colleen Anastasia and Lisa-Renee) both living in the UK.

Jimmy fathered two sons and four daughters named Fiona Adamina Barnett (née Sharpe), Quillon Sandford Sharpe (deceased), Alistair Stanley Sharpe, Pamela Sharpe, Peggy Sharpe and April Sharpe.

Thomas Sharpe later married Kathleen Mary Francis (3 August 1935 in Selukwe-Rhodesia − 7 October 2001 in Francistown, Botswana) on 4 September 1954. They had four daughters: Eileen Mathilda (b. 15 May 1955), Veronica Shirley (b. 4 September 1956), Lorraine Theresa (2 May 1958 − 3 November 1997) and Sybil Cecilia (b. 9 October 1959). They had one son, Thomas Sydney (b. 24 December 1961).

Eileen Mathilda has four children named Darren Zaloumis, Bradley Zaloumis, Leila Zaloumis and Nicoleen Hassam. Veronica Shirley has two children named Glynis Sharpe and Alexandre Paradis. Lorraine Theresa had five children: Melissa Harrington, Michael Harrington, Nicolas Harrington (deceased), Brendan Harrington and Willie Harrington (deceased). Sybil Cecilia has five children: Stacy Wirth, Candice Wirth, Megan Wirth, Sian Wirth and George Wirth Jnr. Thomas Sydney has three children named Storme Sharpe, Stash Sharpe and Starla Sharpe.

Thomas Sharpe died at the age of 50 in Choma, Zambia, in 1971. Thomas was a keen hunter like his grandfather Sir Alfred Sharpe who was renowned and fabled as the Great Elephant Hunter and who was a good personal friend of Sir Cecil Rhodes. Thomas Sharpe owned a butchery with his wife, Kathleen Mary, in Choma and was a leading socialite.

== See also ==
- 1897 Diamond Jubilee Honours
- British Central Africa
- List of famous big game hunters
- Congo Pedicle
- Mwata Kazembe
- Lake Mweru
- Msiri
