= Blantyre Old Town Hall =

Municipal building in Blantyre, Malawi

Old Town Hall
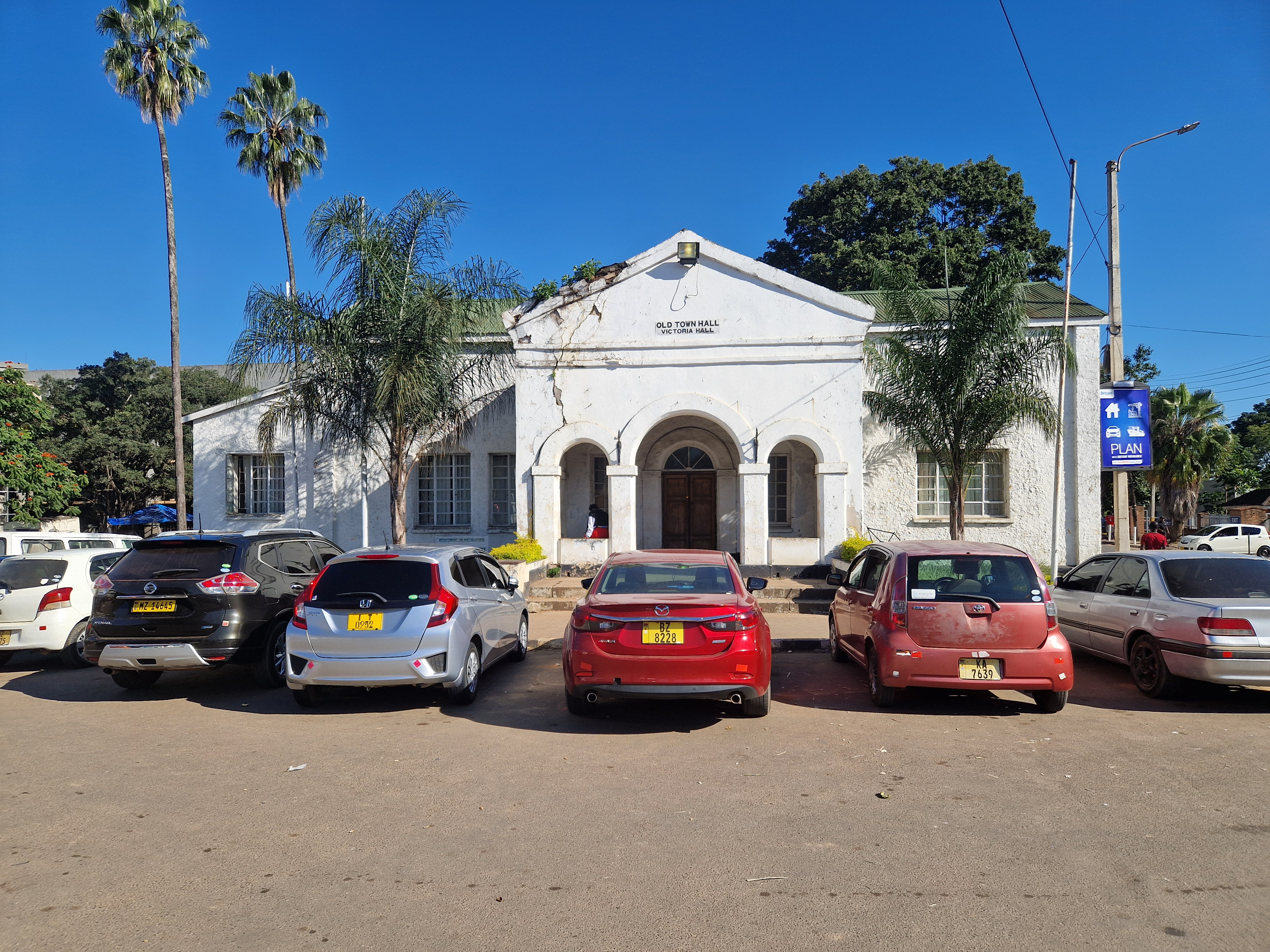
- in 2026
- Interactive map of the Old Town Hall area

General information
- Location: Blantyre, Malawi
- Coordinates: 15°47′20″S 35°00′07″E
- Construction started: 1877
- Completed: 1892

Blantyre Old Town Hall is also known as Queen Victoria Memorial Hall and Old Boma. It is a national monument in the centre of Blantyre. It was built in 1892 and it was the home of the country's first colonial administration.

== History ==
The hall was complete in 1892 after five years of construction. It was built in what was then British Nyasaland and it was the home of the countries first colonial administration when Sir Harry Johnston used it as his office in 1891.

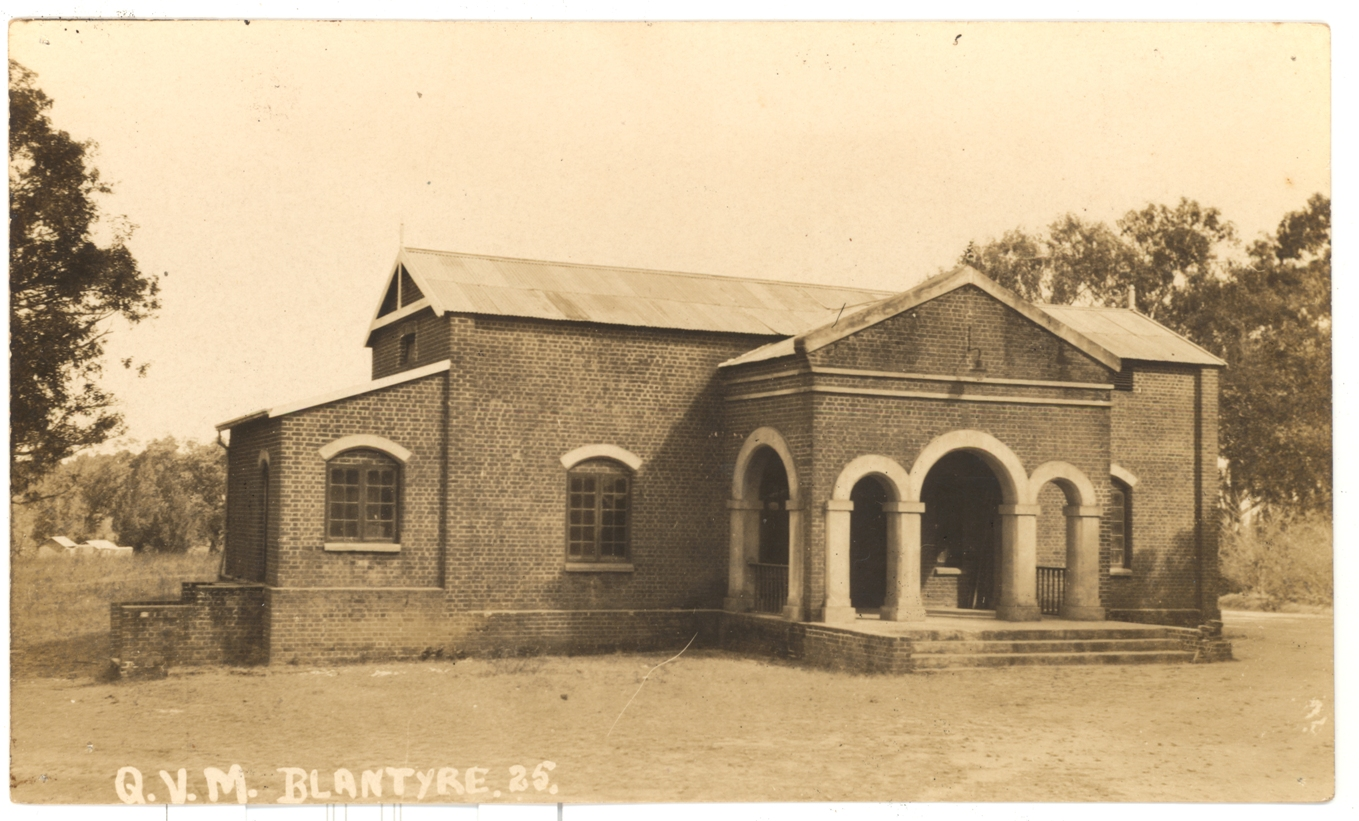
The Queen Victoria Memorial Hall in 1925

In 2015 the President of Malawi instructed that old buildings in Blantyre should be demolished. Over 160 buildings were included but the Old Town Hall was not in the "Red Star" campaign. Blantyre City Council recognised this building as a monument which had "cultural and historical value for the country".

The hall was rehabilitated by the Royal Norwegian Embassy. Recently it has been described as being in good condition and it was rented out to a number of tenants. A sign identified it as a National Monument.

In 2025 there was a proposal by Blantyre City Council to demolish the building and to replace it with a modern multi storey building. The proposal was not well received by the Department of Antiquities. Elizabeth Gomani-Chindebvu works for the Ministry of Sports as their Youth and Culture Principal Secretary. She is in charge of Museums and Antiquities and she said that the "Old Town Hall is not just a building, but a symbol of Blantyre’s origins and civic history".
