= John Buchanan (rugby union, born 1896) =

Scotland international rugby union player

Sir John Buchanan
- Buchanan in 1962
- Born: John Cecil Rankin Buchanan; 18 June 1896 Blantyre, Malawi
- Died: 19 February 1976 (aged 79) Sevenoaks, England
- Notable relative(s): John Buchanan, father

Rugby union career
- Position: Hooker
Amateur team(s)
Years	Team	Apps	(Points)
-	Stewart's College FP		
Provincial / State sides
Years	Team	Apps	(Points)
1919	Edinburgh District		
1920	Cities District		
1921	Scotland Probables		
International career
Years	Team	Apps	(Points)
1921-25	Scotland	16	(3)

Sir John Cecil Rankin Buchanan (18 June 1896 – 19 February 1976) was a Scotland international rugby union player. He was knighted in the Queen's 1961 Birthday Honours, as a Medical advisor to the Secretary of State for the Colonies.

== Life ==
Buchanan was born in 1896 in Blantyre in what is now Malawi. His parents were Cecelia Mackenzie Ferrie, from Campsie in Scotland and John Buchanan who was a leading figure in what became Malawi. When Cecilia was pregnant in 1896, they set off to return Scotland. His father died at Chinde from fever in Mozambique on 9 March 1896.

== Rugby Union career ==
=== Amateur career ===
Buchanan played for Stewart's College FP.

=== Provincial career ===
He played for Edinburgh District.

He played for Cities District against Provinces District on 11 December 1920.

He was due to play for the Provinces District against the Anglo-Scots but his place was instead taken by Robert Gallie of Glasgow Academicals.

He played for Scotland Probables against Provinces District on 10 December 1921.

=== International career ===
He played for Scotland 16 times from 1921 to 1925.

== Military career ==
In the First World War he joined the Black Watch, as a Lieutenant. He was awarded the Mons Star.

In the Second World War he joined the RAMC.

== Medical career ==
He went to Edinburgh University to study medicine.

He was a Medical advisor to the Secretary of State for the Colonies.

He was an author of A Guide to Pacific Island Dietaries in 1947.

== Family ==
His father was John Buchanan (1855-1896), his mother Cecilia McKenzie Ferrie (1867-1941).

He married Ileene Belle Ferrier Roberts (1900-1990) in 1931, however they had no children.
