= British Central Africa Protectorate =

British protectorate from 1893 to 1907

Coordinates: 13°30′S 34°00′E

- 1893–1907
- Flag Coat of arms
- Motto: Light in Darkness
- Anthem: God Save the Queen/King
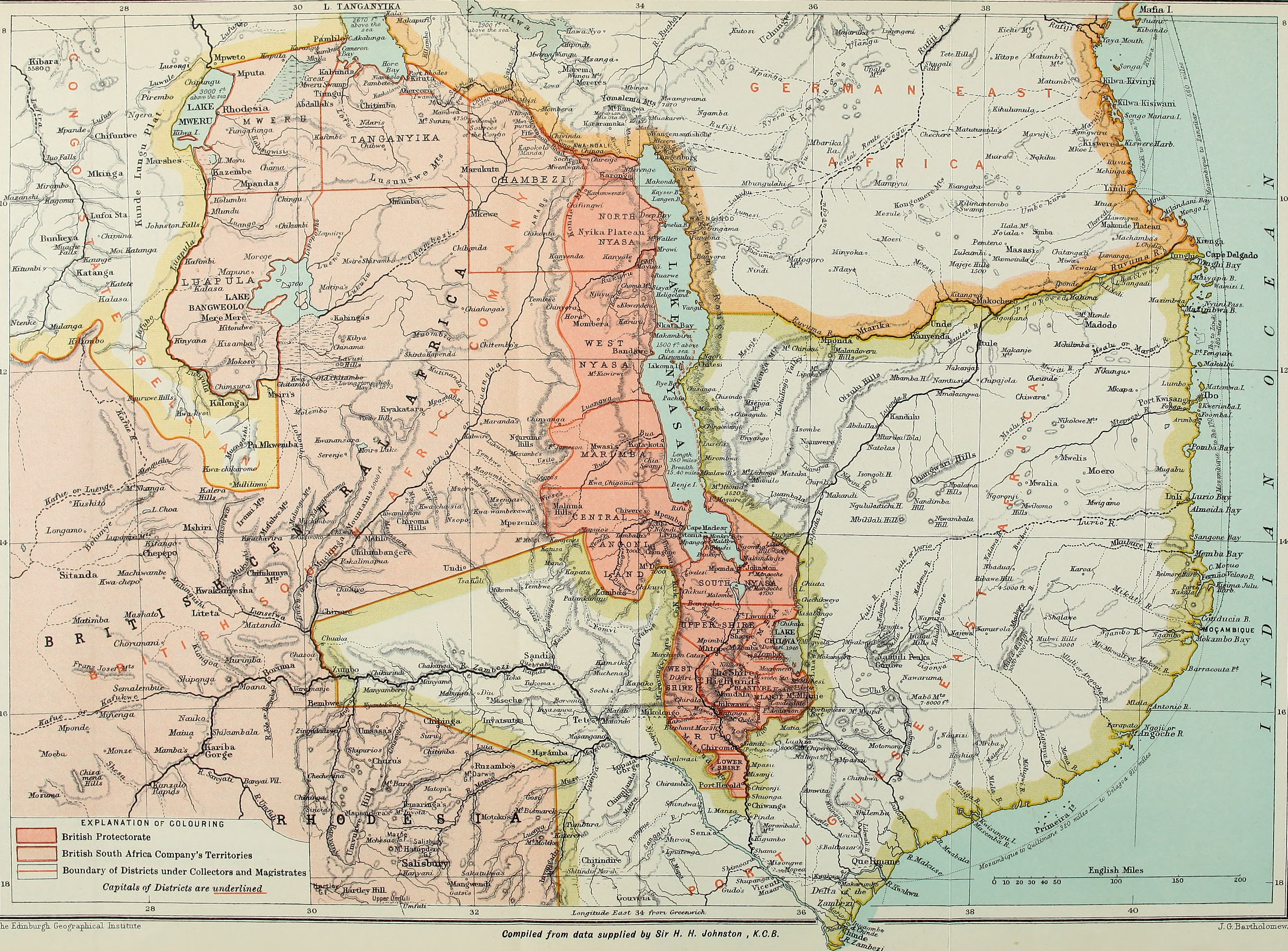
- Map of southern Africa, 1897. The British Central Africa Protectorate is shaded dark pink.
- Status: Protectorate of British Empire
- Capital: Zomba
- Common languages: English (official); Chewa, Yao, Tumbuka
- Religion: Christianity, Islam, Bantu mythology, Tumbuka religion
- Government: Constitutional monarchy
- Monarch
  - 1893–1901: Victoria
  - 1901–1907: Edward VII
- Commissioner
  - 1893–1896 (first): Harry Johnston
  - 1907 (last): Francis Barrow Pearce
- History
  - Established: 1893
  - Changed to Nyasaland Protectorate: 6 July 1907

Area
- 1904: 109,342 km^{2} (42,217 sq mi)
- Currency: Rhodesian pound
Preceded by	Succeeded by
Maravi	Nyasaland

The British Central Africa Protectorate (BCA) was a British protectorate proclaimed in 1889 and ratified in 1891 that occupied the same area as present-day Malawi: it was renamed Nyasaland in 1907. British interest in the area arose from visits made by David Livingstone from 1858 onward during his exploration of the Zambezi area. This encouraged missionary activity that started in the 1860s, undertaken by the Universities' Mission to Central Africa, the Church of Scotland and the Free Church of Scotland, and which was followed by a small number of settlers. The Portuguese government attempted to claim much of the area in which the missionaries and settlers operated, but this was disputed by the British government. To forestall a Portuguese expedition claiming effective occupation, a protectorate was proclaimed, first over the south of this area, then over the whole of it in 1889. After negotiations with the Portuguese and German governments on its boundaries, the protectorate was formally ratified by the British government in May 1891.

== Origin ==
The Shire Highlands south of Lake Nyasa (now Lake Malawi) and the lands west of the lake were explored by David Livingstone between the 1858 and 1864 as part of his Zambezi expeditions. Livingstone suggested that what he claimed was the area's benign climate and fertility would make it ideal for the promotion of Christianity and commerce. As a result of Livingstone's writings, several Anglican and Presbyterian missions were established in the area in the 1860s and 1870s. In 1878 The African Lakes Company Limited, predecessor to the African Lakes Corporation Limited, was established in Glasgow by a group of local businessmen with links to the Presbyterian missions. Their aim was to set up a trade and transport concern that would work in close cooperation with the missions to combat the slave trade by introducing legitimate trade, to make a commercial profit, and to develop European influence in the area. A mission and small trading settlement was established at Blantyre in 1876 and a British consul took up residence there in 1883.

Concessionaires holding prazo estates from the Portuguese crown were active in the lower valley of the Shire River from the 1830s and the Portuguese government claimed suzerainty over much of Central Africa, without maintaining effective occupation over more than a small part of it. In 1879, the Portuguese government formally claimed the area south and east of the Ruo River (which currently forms the southeastern border of Malawi), and in 1882 occupied the lower Shire River valley as far north as the Ruo River. The Portuguese then attempted to negotiate British acceptance of their territorial claims, but the convening of the Berlin Conference (1884) ended these bilateral discussions. Meanwhile, the African Lakes Company was attempting to obtain the status of a Chartered company from the British government, but it had not managed to do so by 1886. In 1885-86 Alexandre de Serpa Pinto undertook a Portuguese expedition which reached the Shire Highlands, but it failed make any treaties of protection with the Yao chiefs in territories west of Lake Malawi.

As late as 1888, the British Foreign Office declined to accept responsibility for protecting the rudimentary British settlements in the Shire Highlands, despite unsubstantiated claims by the African Lakes Company of Portuguese interference with their trading activities. However, it also declined to negotiate with the Portuguese government on their claim that the Shire Highlands should be considered part of Portuguese East Africa, as it was not regarded by the Foreign Office as under effective Portuguese occupation. In order to prevent Portuguese occupation, the British government sent Henry Hamilton Johnston as British consul to Mozambique and the Interior, with instructions to report on the extent of Portuguese rule in the Zambezi and Shire valleys and the vicinity, and to make conditional treaties with local rulers beyond Portuguese jurisdiction. These conditional treaties of friendship did not amount to the establishment of a British protectorate but prevented those rulers from accepting protection from another state. On his way to take up his appointment, Johnston spent six weeks in Lisbon in early 1889 attempting to negotiate an acceptable agreement on Portuguese and British spheres of influence in Central Africa. The draft agreement reached in March 1889 would have created a British sphere including all the area west of Lake Nyasa and also Mashonaland but not including the Shire Highlands and Lower Shire valley, which were to be part of the Portuguese sphere. This went beyond what the Foreign Office was prepared to accept, and the proposal was later rejected.

In 1888, the Portuguese government instructed its representatives in Portuguese East Africa to attempt to make treaties of protection with the Yao chiefs southeast of Lake Malawi and in the Shire Highlands, and an expedition organised under Antonio Cardoso, a former governor of Quelimane, set off in November 1888 for the lake. Rather later, in early 1889, a second expedition led by Alexandre de Serpa Pinto moved up the Shire valley. Between them, these two expeditions made over twenty treaties with chiefs in what is now Malawi. Serpa Pinto met Johnston in August 1889 east of the Ruo River, when Johnston advised him not to cross the river into the Shire Highlands. Previously, Serpa Pinto had acted with caution, but in September, following minor clashes between Serpa Pinto's advancing force and Kololo who had been left behind by Livingstone at the end of his Zambezi expedition in 1864 and had formed minor chieftainships, he crossed the Ruo to Chiromo, now in Malawi. In response to this incursion, Johnston's deputy John Buchanan declared a Shire Highlands Protectorate in Johnston's absence, despite the contrary Foreign Office instructions. It seems probable that Buchanan's action, made without reference to the Foreign Office, but following instructions that Johnston had left before he departed for the north, was to prevent any further advance by Serpa Pinto rather than to establish British rule in the area. However, in October 1889 Serpa Pinto's soldiers attacked one of the Kololo chiefs, killing around 70 of his followers and, with two armed river boats, pushed up the Shire River through the area over which Buchanan had established a protectorate. After Serpa Pinto's departure owing to serious illness in November 1889, his second-in-command, João Coutinho, pushed on as far as Katunga, the nearest river port to Blantyre, and some Kololo chiefs fled to Blantyre for safety.

Johnston's proclamation of a further protectorate, the Nyasaland Districts Protectorate, west of Lake Malawi was also contrary to Foreign Office instructions. However, it was endorsed by the Foreign Office in May 1891. This was because the discovery of the Chinde channel in the Zambezi delta, which was deep enough to allow sea-going ships to enter the Zambezi, which was an international waterway, without having to enter Portuguese territory, whereas previously such ships had to use the port of Quelimane. Salisbury was also influenced by the offer by the British South Africa Company to fund the administration of the protectorate, which convinced him to bow to popular pressure. There followed an Anglo-Portuguese Crisis in which a British refusal of arbitration was followed by the 1890 British Ultimatum of 11 January 1890. This demanded that the Portuguese give up all claims to territories beyond the Ruo River and west of Lake Malawi. The Portuguese government accepted under duress and ordered their troops in the Shire valley to withdraw to the south bank of the Ruo. This order was received by the commander at Katunga on 8 March 1890 and all Portuguese forces had evacuated Katunga and Chiromo by 12 March.

An 1891 Anglo-Portuguese treaty fixed the southern borders of what had been renamed the British Central Africa Protectorate. Although the Ruo River had been the provisional boundary between Portuguese and British spheres of influence since 1879, as part of the 1891 treaty and under strong British pressure, an area west of the Shire and south of its confluence with the Ruo which had been controlled by an Afro-Portuguese family, was allocated to Britain and now forms the Nsanje District. The treaty also granted Britain a 99-year lease over Chinde, a port at one of the Zambezi delta mouths where sea-going ships could transfer goods and passengers to river boats. The northern border of the protectorate was agreed at the Songwe River as part of the Anglo-German Convention in 1890. Its western border with Northern Rhodesia was fixed in 1891 at the drainage divide between Lake Malawi and the Luangwa River by agreement with the British South Africa Company, which governed what is today Zambia under Royal Charter until 1924.

== Consolidation ==
In 1891, Johnston only controlled a fraction of the Shire Highlands, itself a small part of the whole protectorate, and initially had a force of only 70 Indian troops to impose British rule. These troops, later reinforced by Indian and African recruits, were used up to 1895 to fight several small wars against those unwilling to give up their independence. After this, until 1898, troops were used to assist the locally recruited police force to suppress the slave trade. The three main groups resisting British occupation were Yao chiefs in the south of the protectorate and Swahili groups around the centre and north of Lake Nyasa, both involved in the slave trade, and Ngoni people who had formed two aggressively expansionists kingdoms in the west and north.

The Yao chiefdoms were closest to the European settlements in the Shire Highlands and, as early as August 1891, Johnston used his small force against three minor chiefs before attacking the most important Yao chief, who was based on the eastern shore of Lake Nyasa. After initial success, Johnston's forces were ambushed and forced to retreat and, during 1892, undertook no further action against the several Yao chief that rejected British control. However, in 1893, Cecil Rhodes made a special grant to allow Johnston to recruit a further 200 Indian troops and also African mercenaries to take action to counter armed resistance and, by the end of 1895, the only Yao resistance was from small armed bands without fixed bases that were able to cross into Mozambique when challenged.

Next, Johnston prepared to attack Mlozi bin Kazbadema, the leader of the so-called "north end Arabs", although most of those that contemporary Europeans in East Africa described as Arabs were either Muslim Swahili from the east coast of Africa or Nyamwezi people, who imitated Arab dress and customs but were rarely Muslims. Mlozi had defeated two attempts which the African Lakes Company Limited in the Karonga War had made between 1887 and 1889, with some unofficial British government support, to dislodge him and his followers and end the slave trade. Johnston had signed a truce with him in October 1889 and left him in peace until late 1895, despite Mlozi often breaking the terms of that truce. Johnston first secured the neutrality of the Swahili ruler of Nkhotakota by paying him a subsidy and, in November 1895, he embarked a force of over 400 Sikh and African riflemen with artillery and machine guns on steamers at Fort Johnston and set out for Karonga. Without any prior warning, Johnston assaulted two of Mlozi's smaller stockades on 2 December and, on the same day, surrounded Mlozi's large, double-fenced fortified town, bombarding it for two days and finally assaulting it on 4 December, facing stiff resistance. Mlozi was captured, given a cursory trial and hanged on 5 December: between 200 and 300 of his fighters were killed, many while attempting to surrender, as well as several hundred non-combatants, who were killed in the bombardment. The other Swahili stockades did not resist and were destroyed after their surrender.

The Maseko Ngoni kingdom in the west of the protectorate had been the most powerful state in the region in the 1880s but was weakened by internal disputes and a civil war. Initially, Gomani, the victor in the civil war that ended in 1891, was on good terms with British officials and missionaries, but he became concerned at the number of his young men going to work on European-owned estates in the Shire Highlands and by Johnston's forceful reaction to Yao resistance. In November 1895, he forbade his subjects either to pay taxes to, or work for, the British, and he was also accused of harassing nearby missions which had told their members not to obey Gomani's instructions. Johnston's deputy Alfred Sharpe attacked and defeated Gomani's forces on 23 October 1896. Gomani was sentenced to death by a court martial and shot on 27 October. Within a year, 5,000 of his former subjects were working in the Blantyre area.

As the northern Ngoni kingdom did not threaten European trading interests, as it was far from European-owned estates, and as the Scottish mission at Livingstonia was influential within the kingdom, Johnston did not use force against it. It accepted British rule in 1904 on condition of retaining its own traditions. Its king was recognised as a paramount chief, the only one in the protectorate at that time, and received a government salary, whereas Gomani's son only received comparable recognition in the 1930s.

== Administration and the land issue ==
British Consuls for the Nyasa District ("to the territories of the kings and chiefs in the districts adjacent to Nyassa")

- 1 Oct 1883 - 16 Aug 1884 Charles Edward Foot (b. 1841 - d. 1884)
- 16 Aug 1884 - 24 Oct 1885 Lawrence Charles Goodrich (acting)
- 24 Oct 1885 - 12 Feb 1888 Albert George Sidney Hawes (b. 1842 - d. 1897)
- 12 Feb 1888 - 10 Sep 1891 John Buchanan (acting)

The offer by the British South Africa Company to fund the administration of the newly-formed protectorate was part of an attempt by Cecil Rhodes to take over the administration of all the territory claimed by Britain north of the Zambezi. This was resisted, particularly by the Scottish missionaries and, in February 1891, Salisbury agreed to a compromise under which what later became Northern Rhodesia would be under company administration and what later became Nyasaland would be administered by the Foreign Office. However Henry Hamilton Johnston would be both the Administrator of the British South Africa Company's territory and Commissioner and Consul-General of the protectorate, and would receive a payment of £10,000 a year from Rhodes towards the expenses of administering both territories. This arrangement lapsed in 1900, when North-Eastern Rhodesia was formed as a separate protectorate with its own Administrator.

Harry Johnston, who became Sir Henry at the end of his term, was Commissioner and Consul-General from 1 February 1891 to 16 April 1896. Alfred Sharpe, Sir Alfred from 1903, who had been Johnston's deputy from 1891, took over as Commissioner and Consul-General in 1896, serving until 1 April 1910 (first as Commissioner and Consul-General and then as Governor of the Nyasaland Protectorate from 1907), with Francis Barrow Pearce as acting Commissioner from 1 April 1907 to 30 September 1907 and William Henry Manning as acting Commissioner from 1 October 1907 to 1 May 1908. Although the first Consul appointed in 1883 had used Blantyre as his base, the second moved to Zomba because it was closer to the slave route running from Lake Malawi to the coast. Johnston also preferred Zomba because of its relative isolation, healthiness and superb scenery, and it became the governor's residence and administrative capital throughout the colonial period although Blantyre remained the commercial centre.

In 1896, Johnston set up a small government Secretariat in Zomba which, with the addition of a few technical advisers appointed soon after, formed the nucleus of his central administration. In 1892, Johnston received powers to set up courts and divide the protectorate into districts and, until 1904 when the Colonial Office assumed this responsibility, he selected district officials with the title of Collectors of Revenue, Their official title later became Residents, and they were the predecessors of District Commissioners. Their main duties were to collect taxes, to ensure a supply of labour to European-owned estates and government projects and ensure government instructions and regulations were carried out. Johnston's Collectors included ex-soldiers, ex-missionaries and ex-employees of the African Lakes Company: the main consideration was that they had African experience. A few Collectors in strategically important locations had contingents of troops attached to their district, but most had no more than one or two assistants. By 1905 there were 12 Collectors and 26 Assistant Collectors.

The power of existing chiefs were minimised in favour of direct rule by the Residents, as Johnston did not consider the chiefs should play any part in the administration of the protectorate. The exception was the Northern Ngoni Kingdom, which retained a significant degree of autonomy. In practice, however, the relatively few district officers required the cooperation of local chiefs it administer their districts and allowed chiefs to continue in their traditional roles.

One of the major legal problems facing Johnston was that of land claims. For up to 25 years before the protectorate was formed, a number of European traders, missionaries and others had claimed to have acquired often large areas of land through contracts signed with local chiefs, usually for derisory payment. Although Johnston had a duty to look into the validity of these land deals, and although he accepted that the land belonged to its tribes and that their chiefs had no right to alienate it, he put forward the legal fiction that each chief's people had tacitly accepted he could assume such a right. As a result, Johnston accepted the validity of those claims where the signatory was the chief of the tribe occupying the land, provided that the terms of the contract were not inconsistent with British sovereignty. Where claims were accepted, Johnston issued Certificates of Claim (in effect the grant of freehold, or fee simple, title). Out of 61 claims made, only two were rejected outright and a handful reduced in size. These Certificate of Claim were issued at a time when no professional judges had been appointed to the protectorate, and the work of Johnston and his assistants was subsequently criticised by judges and later administrators.

In total, 59 Certificates of Claim to land rights were registered, mostly between 1892 and 1894, covering an area of 1,499,463 hectares (3,705,255 acres), or 15% of the total land area of the Protectorate. This included 1,093,614 hectares (2,702,379 acres) in the North Nyasa District that the British South Africa Company had acquired for its mineral potential and which was never turned into plantation estates. Except for this large grant in the Northern Region, much of the remaining land, some 351,000 hectares (867,000 acres) of estates, included much of the best arable land in the Shire Highlands, which was the most densely populated part of the country.

In the first years of the protectorate, very little of the alienated land was planted. Settlers wanted labour and encouraged existing Africans to stay on the undeveloped land, and new workers (often migrants from Mozambique) to move onto it, and grow their own crops. From the late 1890s, when the estates started to produce coffee, the owners began to charge these tenants a rent, usually satisfied by two months’ labour a year, of which one month was to meet the worker's tax obligation; however, some owners demanded longer periods of labour.

In order to raise revenue, and also to increase the supply of labour, a Hut tax was imposed from 1895 in the Shire Highlands. This was gradually extended to the rest of the protectorate, becoming universal in 1906. It was nominally three shillings a year, but could be satisfied by one month's labour a year spent on a settler estate or working for the government.

The name of the protectorate was changed to the Nyasaland Protectorate on 6 July 1907.

== Population ==
There was only one, rather limited, official census in this period, in 1901, which returned a population of 736,724. However, the African population was estimated on the basis of hut tax records with a multiplier for the average inhabitants per hut. As no taxes were collected in some areas in the north of the protectorate in 1901, their inhabitants were estimated on the basis of occasional official visits. It is believed that much of the country was reasonably well populated in the mid-19th century, but by the 1880s large areas had become underpopulated through devastating raids by the Ngoni people and the famines which they caused or as the result of slave raiding. There may well have been large areas in the Shire Highlands that had been virtually depopulated.

Some of the shortfall in population may have been made good by the inward migration of families groups of so-called "Anguru", Lomwe speaking migrants from the parts of Mozambique east of the Shire Highlands estates, who became estate tenants. They began to arrive from 1899, and the 1921 census counted 108,204 "Anguru". Neither the 1901 nor the 1911 censuses recorded tribal affiliation, but the very substantial population increases in districts adjacent to Mozambique, especially Blantyre and Zomba districts, whose recorded populations more than doubled in this decade, suggest substantial immigration. In this period, relatively few Africans left the protectorate as migrant workers, but outward labour migration became more common later.

British occupation did not significantly change African society within the protectorate until the First World War, with most people continuing to live under the social and political systems that existed before 1891. No attempt was made to remove or limit the powers of the Yao, Ngoni or Makololo chiefs (who had first entered the area in the 19th century) over the original inhabitants they had displaced, subjugated or assimilated, although the Swahili slave traders had been killed in the warfare of the 1890s or had left. One area in which early efforts to change the system manifestly failed was that of domestic slavery. Although slave-trading had been eliminated, and Johnston issued instructions that domestic slaves were to be emancipated, this particular form of slavery endured, particularly in the Central Region, well into the first quarter of the 20th century.

== Economy and transport ==
Throughout the period of the protectorate, most of its people were subsistence farmers growing maize, millet and other food crops for their own consumption. As the protectorate had no economic mineral resources, its colonial economy had to be based on agriculture, but before 1907 this had hardly started to develop. In pre-colonial times trade was limited to the export of ivory and forest products such as natural rubber in exchange for cloth and metals and, for the first few years of the protectorate, ivory and rubber collected from indigenous vines were the principal elements of a tiny export trade. The first estate crop was coffee, grown commercially in quantity from around 1895, but competition from Brazil, which had flooded the world markets with coffee by 1905, and droughts led to its decline in favour of tobacco and cotton. Both these crops had previously been grown in small quantities, but the decline of coffee prompted planters to turn to tobacco in the Shire Highlands and cotton in the Shire Valley. Tea was also first planted commercially in 1905 in the Shire Highlands, but significant development of tobacco and tea growing only took place after the opening of the Shire Highlands Railway in 1908.

Before the railway opened, water was the most efficient means of transport. From the time of Livingstone's 1859 expedition, small steamers navigated the Zambezi-Lower Shire river system, and they were later introduced on the Upper Shire and Lake Malawi. The Upper and Lower Shire were separated by about 100 kilometres (60 mi) of the Middle Shire, where rapids and shallows made navigation impractical, and both the Upper and Lower Shire were often too shallow for larger vessels, particularly in the dry season. In addition, the main areas of economic activity in the early protectorate were in the Shire Highlands, mainly near Blantyre, which was 40 km (25 mi) from Chikwawa, a small Shire River port. Transport of goods to river ports was by inefficient and costly head porterage, as the Shire valley was unsuitable for draught animals.

Shallow draught steamers carrying 100 tons or less had to negotiate Lower Shire marshes and low-water hazards in the Zambezi and its delta to reach the small, poorly equipped coastal port of Chinde in Mozambique. Low water levels in Lake Nyasa reduced the Shire River's flow from 1896 to 1934, so the main river port was moved, first to Chiromo, further from the main settlements below a steep escarpment and from 1908 to Port Herald (now Nsanje).

As early as 1895, Johnston suggested a line from the protectorate's main commercial town, Blantyre, to Quelimane in Mozambique. However, most of its proposed route was in Portuguese territory and Quelimane was only suitable for small ships. Also in 1895, Eugene Sharrer proposed building a railway from Blantyre to Chiromo, and he formed the Shire Highlands Railway Company Limited in December 1895 to achieve this. Although Johnston urged the Foreign Office to finance this railway, it declined to do so, but in 1901 it agreed in principle to the company building the proposed railway, and granted the company 146,300 hectares (361,600 acres) of land adjacent to the railway route. Because of delays over raising the funds needed for construction, and disputes over its route, it was not until early 1903 that construction began. The line was opened from Blantyre to Chiromo in 1907.

Modern communications began to be established in 1891, with the opening of the territory's first post office at Chiromo. This remained the main sorting office until after the railway was opened, when Limbe became the postal hub. A telegraph connection from Blantyre to Cape Town via Umtali was established in April 1898.

== History of the protectorate ==
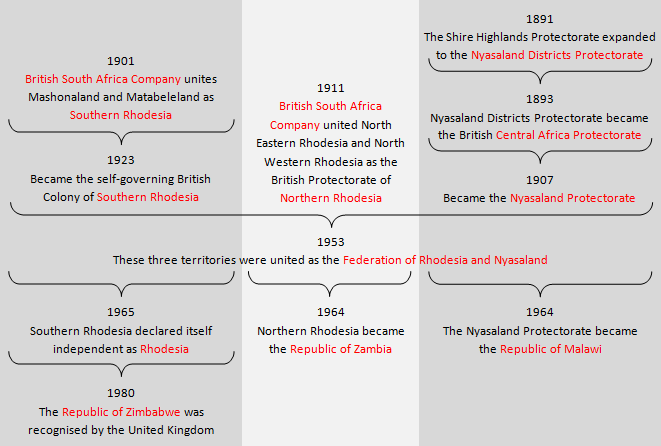
Evolution of the British Central Africa Protectorate

== Postage stamps and postal history ==
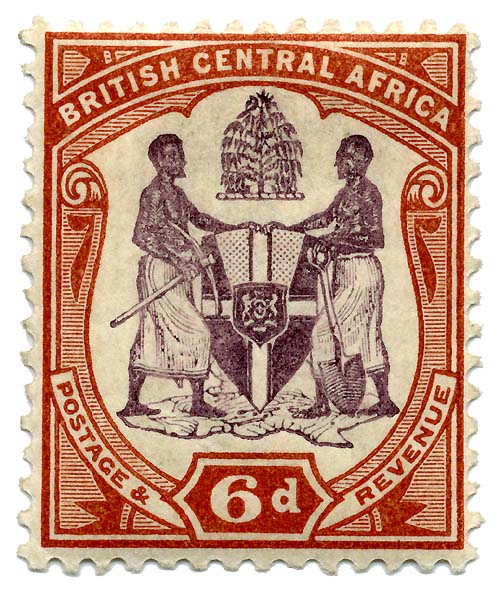
Stamp displaying the BCA coat of arms
