= Land tenure in England =

Aspect of English land law

Even before the Norman Conquest, there was a strong tradition of landholding in Anglo-Saxon law. When William the Conqueror asserted sovereignty over England in 1066, he confiscated the property of the recalcitrant English landowners. Over the next dozen years, he granted land to his lords and to the dispossessed Englishmen, or affirmed their existing land holdings, in exchange for fealty and promises of military and other services. At the time of the Domesday Book, all land in England was held by someone, and from that time there has been no allodial land in England. In order to legitimise the notion of the Crown's paramount lordship, a legal fiction—that all land titles were held by the King's subjects as a result of a royal grant—was adopted.

Most of these tenants-in-chief had considerable land holdings and proceeded to grant parts of their land to their subordinates. This constant process of granting new tenures was known as subinfeudation. It created a complicated pyramid of feudal relationships. (see also Lord of the manor). At the bottom of the feudal pyramid were the tenants who lived on and worked the land (called the tenants in demesne and also the tenant paravail). In the middle were the lords who had no direct relationship with the King, or with the land in question - referred to as mesne lords.

Land was granted in return for various "services" and "incidents". A service was an obligation on the part of the tenant owed to the landlord. The most important were payment of rent (socage tenure), military service (Knight-service), the performance of some form of religious service (frankalmoin) and personal/official service, including in times of war (serjeanty tenure).

Incidents, on the other hand, were rights conferred on the lord over the tenant's land or the tenant's person that arose in certain circumstances, most commonly on the death of the tenant. An important incident was that of escheat, whereby the land of the tenant by knight service would escheat to the Crown in the event either of there being no heirs, or the knight's being convicted of a felony.

== Spatial fragmentation of proprietary interests ==
The concept of land tenure has been described as a "spatial fragmentation of proprietary interests in land". No one person could claim absolute ownership of a parcel of land, except the Crown. Thus the modern concept of "ownership" is not helpful in explaining the complexity of the distribution of rights. In relation to a particular piece of land, a number of people had rights: first, the tenant in demesne with possessory rights; second the mesne lord to whom the tenant owed services; third, a tenant in chief to whom the mesne lord owed services; and finally the Crown who received services directly from the tenant in chief.

== Decline of land tenure ==
The feudal system in England gradually became more and more complex until eventually the process became cumbrous and services difficult to enforce. As a result, the statute of Quia Emptores was passed in 1290 to replace subinfeudation with substitution, so the subordinate tenant transferred their tenure rather than creating a new subordinate tenure. As tenancies came to an end, the number of layers in the feudal pyramid was reduced. The Tenures Abolition Act 1660 abolished knight service, converting all free tenures to socage tenure.

Quia Emptores and its equivalents do not apply to leases and life estates. In essence, lease of land to a tenant is a form of subinfeudation (unless the lease is granted by the Crown).

== Surveys of land ownership ==
The main two official surveys undertaken in the British Isles with the aim of identifying owners of land and land values are the Domesday Book of 1086 and the Return of Owners of Land, 1873.

== See also ==
- History of English land law
