= African Lakes Corporation =

British company

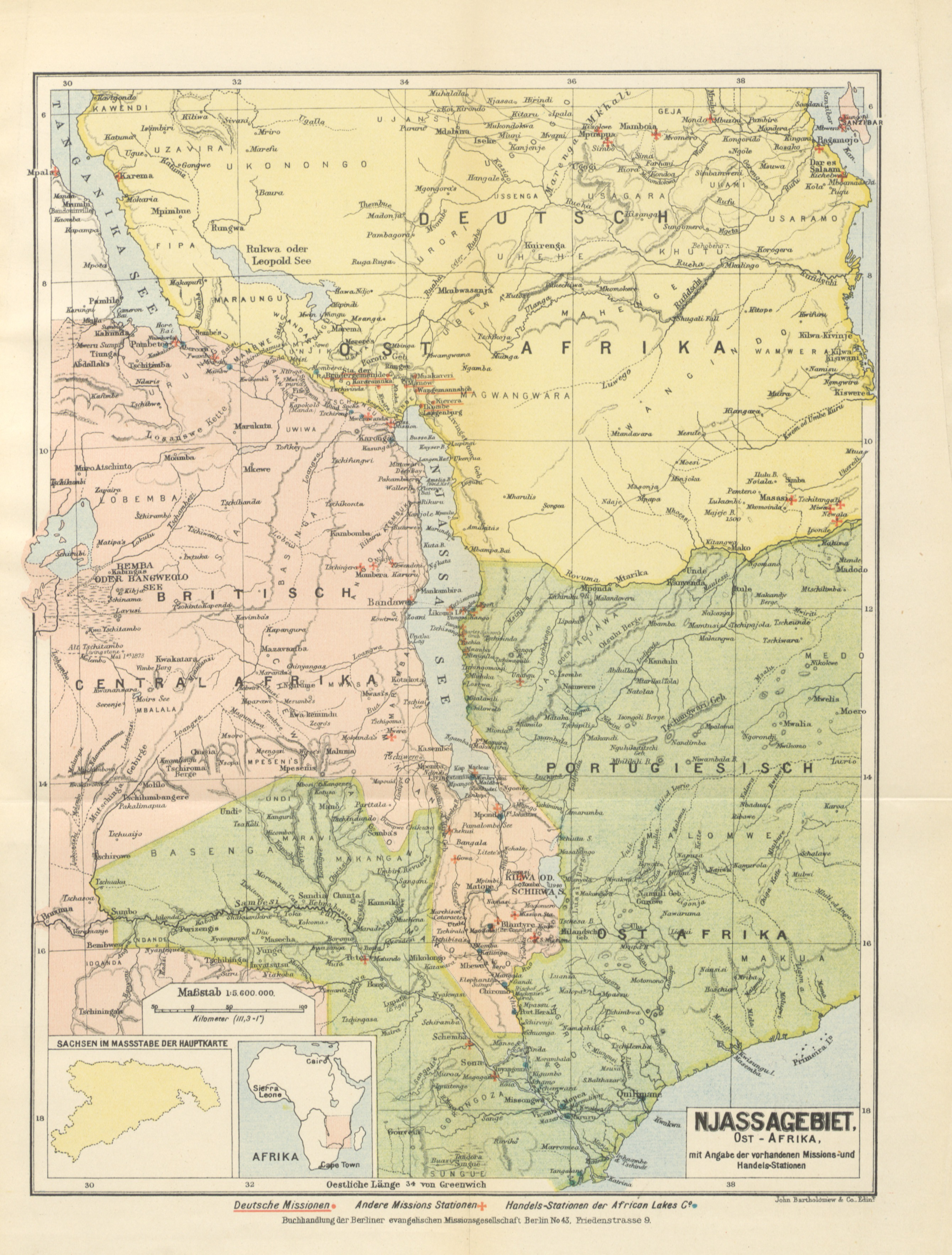

The African Lakes Corporation plc was a British company originally set-up in 1877 by Scottish businessmen to co-operate with Presbyterian missions in what is now Malawi. Despite its original connections with the Free Church of Scotland, it operated its businesses in Africa on a commercial rather than a philanthropic basis. It had political ambitions in the 1880s to control part of Central Africa and engaged in armed conflict with Swahili traders. Its businesses in the colonial era included water transport on the lakes and rivers of Central Africa, wholesale and retail trading including the operation of general stores, labour recruitment, landowning and later an automotive business. The company later diversified, but suffered an economic decline in the 1990s and was liquidated in 2007. One of the last directors of the company kindly bought the records of the company and donated them to Glasgow University Archive Services, where they are still available for research.

== Formation and activities in the colonial era ==
The predecessor of this company was established as the Livingstonia Central Africa Company in 1877 with its head office in Glasgow by a group of local businessmen. Its first directors were James Cochran Stevenson, John Stephen, James S Napier, James White and James Young, and David Livingstone's son-in law Alexander Low Bruce joined them soon after. Its first managers were two brothers, John Moir and Frederick Moir.

The company was renamed The African Lakes Company Limited in 1878 as the company intended to extend its operations to Lake Tanganyika but failed to do so before an Anglo-German agreement of 1885 allocated the lake's eastern shore to German East Africa. John Moir left the company in 1890, but Frederick Moir returned to Scotland in 1891 and continued to work for it there. All of the original directors of the company and several of its original shareholders were connected to the Foreign Missions Committee of the Free Church of Scotland, the parent body of Livingstonia Mission. Their aim was to set up a trade and transport concern that would work in close cooperation with the missions, aiming to combat the slave trade by introducing legitimate trade, to make a profit, and to develop European influence in the area.

By 1884 the African Lakes Company was almost bankrupt: its failure lay from the modest initial share capital of £120,000 it raised to achieve its ambitious plans and its failure to make adequate profits from its trading activities. The latter arose because it had difficulty supplying promptly the range of acceptable trade goods needed to exchange for ivory, and because it could not compete with Swahili traders. It tried to revive its fortunes by diverting ivory away the Swahili traders, which led to conflict.

The company established trading posts at locations along the shores of Lake Nyasa and in the Lower Shire Valley in the late 1870s and early 1880s. As first, its commercial activities were hampered by the requirement to supply the mission stations and by its lack of capital. Its managers, the Moir brothers, concentrated on trading ivory rather than cash crops but faced stiff completion from Swahili traders. From 1883, the company set up a base in Karonga to exchange ivory for trade goods. Ivory was mainly provided by a trader named Mlozi, who also traded in slaves. By 1886, the company's relationship with Mlozi and other Swahili traders deteriorated, partly because of its delays in providing suitable trade goods, and its unwillingness to supply guns and ammunition, but partly as the Swahili traders turned more to slaving, and began to attack Ngonde communities that the company had promised to protect. Its promise to defend the people of the Karonga lakeside against the well-armed Swahili traders seeking slaves as well as ivory involved the company in conflict against the Swahili and their allies. After some attempts at negotiating a settlement between the Swahili traders and Ngonde chiefs failed, the African Lakes Company began to intervene on behalf of the Ngonde. Fighting took place in the so-called "Arab War" between November 1886 and December 1887 and again from April 1888 to March 1889. In the latter phase, it engaged Captain Lugard of the Indian Army, later Frederick Lugard, 1st Baron Lugard to attack stockades built by the Swahili traders in June 1888 and January and February 1889, without success. Its lack of success in this put an end to its political claims in this area also.

Despite its lack of capital and poor trading performance in the first decade of its existence, the African Lakes Company had the ambition of becoming a Chartered company and controlling the route along the Shire River to Lake Nyasa. Accordingly, it made, or claimed to have made, treaties between 1884 and 1886 with local chiefs at the northwest of Lake Nyasa around Karonga, where it had a trading station and approached the British government in February 1886 to be granted a Charter. The company gave up any ambition to control the Shire Highlands in 1886, as local missionaries protested that did not have the capacity to police this area effectively. However, the company claimed the treaties it had made with the chiefs also entitled it to ownership of over 2.7 million acres, amounting to all of what was the North Nyasa District (covering all of today's Karonga, Chitipa and Rumphi District districts). Investigations in 1929 showed that the company's claims were spurious: some supposed treaties had never been made, others were with people who were not chiefs of the areas claimed, and some were obtained by deception. The company was said to have made almost no effort to develop its lands, but had sold off some of it to plantations, and local people were concerned that there would be further sales. By this time of this report, the company had been taken over by the British South Africa Company (BSAC), which agreed in 1930 to the cancellation of the land title in exchange for the grant of mineral rights over the same area.

The company's ambition to become chartered in 1886 was strongly opposed by local missionaries, and it was deemed incapable of administering the area around Lake Nyasa by the British government. However, as the government was unwilling at that time to assume responsibility for that area, and also considered a solution by which the BSAC would invest in the African Lakes Company might cause difficulties with the Portuguese or German governments, both of which had interests in the area. In 1891, the British government proclaimed a protectorate, the Nyasaland Districts Protectorate, over areas to the west and south of Lake Nyasa, and was willing for the BSAC to contribute to the cost of its administration. That company agreed to subscribe £5,000 for new African Lakes Company shares, and pay the company a £2,500 annual subsidy. Once the BSAC acquired control of the company, it lost its former connection with the Free Church of Scotland and, whatever had been its aim before, it became part of an exploitative operations of its parent company Although the BSAC had 97.5% control from 1891, the African Lakes Company's directors resisted their company being placed into liquidation until 1893, when the business of The African Lakes Company Limited was transferred to The African Lakes Trading Corporation Limited, a company registered in Scotland, which re-registered as a public limited company named The African Lakes Corporation plc in 1982.

The African Lakes Company was also involved in water transport and operated a number of steamboats on Lake Nyasa and the Shire River down to the mouth of the Zambezi River at Chinde. The British concession at Chinde was leased from the Portuguese government for 99 years from 1890 and became an ocean port served by Union-Castle Line and German East Africa Line ships until 1914, when services were suspended. A limited Union Castle service was resumed in 1918, but ceased in 1922, when a cyclone damaged the port. In 1897, African Lakes had a trading station at Chinde, at which passengers transferred to its fleet of around six small river steamers of up to 40 tons which took passengers and goods from there up the Zambezi and Shire River, along which it had other trading stations, to the British Central Africa Protectorate. It also had several trading stations around, and three lake steamers on, Lake Nyasa (the largest of 177 tons), a steamer and a large sailing boat on Lake Tanganyika and a small river steamer on the upper Shire. The development of the port of Beira, Mozambique, the construction of the Trans-Zambezi Railway towards Beira and a disastrous cyclone in 1922 which severely damaged Chinde sank brought most river traffic on the Zambezi to an end. The new Trans-Zambezi Railway Company took over the fleet of the African Lakes Company in 1923 and these vessels were used to ferry traffic across the Zambezi.

As early as the 1880s, the company recruited labour near Livingstonia Mission and transported them in its steamers to work on six-month contracts in the Upper Shire Valley, the start of labour migration in Central Africa; by 1894, it employed 5,500 migrant workers in the Shire Highlands. In addition to its trading stations, the company opened stores in towns aimed at wholesale trade and Europeans, and by 1911, it had also opened around 50 "Mandala" village stores. The colloquially name Mandala reputedly derived from the spectacles worn by John Moir, which reflected light like a pool of water. The company's original base in Blantyre, Mandala House, still exists and is a National Monument and the oldest building in Malawi. After the rail link to Beira led to the sale of its steamers, the company focused on its Mandala stores and established an automotive business, Mandala Motors in 1924, which grew to include 11 countries in Africa.

== Post-colonial activities and liquidation ==
During the 1980s and in order to utilise Advance corporation tax (ACT) paid on dividends to shareholders, the Company acquired several profitable motor dealerships in the United Kingdom. The performance of the investment was woeful. During the recession in the mid-1990s the Company was forced to dispose its UK Motor Group as these were incurring losses the Company could not sustain. It then successfully raised new capital, bringing in new investors, to clear residual debt and expand its activities. The Company was successful after this in raising additional capital and acquired further automotive and IT distribution companies, disposed of its hotel group in Malawi and then acquired Africa Online, an Internet Service Provider based in Nairobi.

Thus the Company focused on three core activities, automotive, IT distribution and internet in sub-Saharan Africa, but thereafter made the internet its focus. This proved to be the Company's and its Management's undoing. Ultimately in order to sustain the cash required for its early-stage internet operations and its projected expansion the Company was forced, in the absence of new capital, to dispose any assets it could to raise money. The Company sold its non-internet businesses including the Vizara Rubber Estate in northern Malawi for what could be considered a fraction of its actual worth to a consortium of three including the then General Manager of the estate Dinesh K Chugh in March 2003, while in May 2002 the entire Malawi automotive interests Mandala Ltd (T/A Malital Ltd and Malawi Motors) were sold to the French Group CFAO SA (formerly Compagnie Française de l'Afrique Occidentale).

Sales of profitable investments together with continued losses and massive provisions against the investment in its internet business led to significant losses, a deteriorating balance sheet and a very low share price. The Company had been listed since incorporation and had also listed shares on the Nairobi Stock Exchange, but following the collapse of its share price it was delisted in 2003 and became a private company. It ceased trading around 2004. On cessation of its listing its share price was less than 1 pence, the lowest in its 120-year history. Thereafter management restructured the balance sheet to wipe out a large number of shareholders.

Finally the receivers were called in. The Company sold Africa Online to Telkom South Africa as its last asset in 2007 for a portion of its original gross investment and is now being liquidated after over 130 years of operation.

== African Lakes Company Limited ==
On 18 December 2013, a company registered in Scotland (company number SC463944) and named African Lakes Company Ltd was incorporated. This new company is not the same company as that incorporated in 1877 and renamed The African Lakes Company Limited in 1878, nor in any sense a successor to the original African Lakes Corporation Ltd, as it did not acquire any of the original company's assets and has a distinct legal personality. It remained a Dormant company with minimal share capital until May 2017, when between 25 May and 29 September acquired new directors, reorganised its Share capital and issued loan capital, adopted Articles of Association and moved the company's registered office to Edinburgh. As at 11 November 2017, the company had 17 shareholders and it has the status of an active company In 2017 a group of Scottish investors decided to use the African Lakes Company Ltd name as a vehicle for responsible Scottish investment in Malawi, with the goals as stated in their website being to encourage investment in Malawian businesses, build sustainable livelihoods, generate a financial return for investors and reduce Malawi's dependence on aid. The website claims that this project has the support of the Scottish and Malawian Governments and number of experienced Scottish investors
