= Abrahams Commission =

Commission of inquiry in Nyasaland Protectorate

The Abrahams Commission (also known the Land Commission) was a commission appointed by the Nyasaland government in 1946 to inquire into land issues in Nyasaland. This followed riots and disturbances by tenants on European-owned estates in Blantyre and Cholo districts in 1943 and 1945. The commission had only one member, Sir Sidney Abrahams, a Privy Counsellor and lawyer, the former Attorney General of the Gold Coast, Zanzibar and Uganda, and the former Chief Justice, first of Uganda and then Ceylon. There had been previous reviews to consider the uneven distribution of land between Africans and European, the shortage of land for subsistence farming and the position of tenants on private estates. These included the Jackson Land Commission in 1920, the Ormsby-Gore Commission on East Africa in 1924 and, most recently, the Bell Commission on the Financial Position and Development of Nyasaland in 1938, but none of these had provided a permanent solution. Abrahams proposed that the Nyasaland government should purchase all unused or under-utilised freehold land on European-owned estates, which would then become Crown land, available to African farmers. The Africans on estates were to be offered the choice of remaining on their current estate as paid workers or tenants, or of moving to Crown land. These proposals were not implemented in full until 1952. The report of the Abrahams Commission divided opinion. Africans were generally in favour of its proposals, as were both the governors in post from 1942 to 1947, Edmund Richards (who had proposed the establishment of a Land Commission), and the incoming governor, Geoffrey Colby. Estate owners and managers were strongly against it, and many European settlers bitterly attacked it.

== Origins of the Land Issue ==
In pre-colonial times, the rules of customary law in much of what is today Malawi attributed the ownership of land to the African communities that occupied it. Community leaders could allow community members to use specified areas of communal land and to retain it for as long as it was in productive use, but they did not usually grant its use to outsiders. Neither the leaders nor the current members of a community could alienate its land, which they held in trust for future generations.

In the period before a British protectorate was proclaimed 1891, the African Lakes Company and several individuals, notably Eugene Sharrer, Alexander Low Bruce (the son-in-law of David Livingstone) and John Buchanan and his brothers, claimed that they had made treaties of protection or purchase agreements with various chiefs, under which they had become owners of large areas of land. The chiefs had no understanding of English concepts of land tenure and may have intended only to grant a right to cultivate vacant land in exchange for protection. In addition, documentation was often lacking or ambiguous and, in the case of purchases, the buyers gave only trivial quantities of goods in exchange for large landholdings.

Harry Johnston was appointed as the first Commissioner of the British Central Africa Protectorate in July 1891. Johnston did not consider that the Crown had a general claim to sovereignty over any land unless it had been expressly transferred by cession. Without sovereignty, the Crown had no right to alienate that land. However, some treaties made after July 1891 did cede sovereignty over land to the crown, but also granted the communities involved in the transfer the right to retain any land that they actually occupied as Crown tenants, leaving any vacant land free for the Crown to alienate as it saw fit. Johnston also accepted that the treaties and agreements made before the start of the protectorate might be evidence of sales of land. Even though he accepted that the land belonged to its African communities, not the chiefs, Johnston proposed the legal fiction that the people had given their chiefs the right to sell it. This interpretation validated the chiefs’ sales and grants of unused land to Europeans. He also claimed that he was entitled to investigate whether these sales were valid and, if they were, to issue Certificates of Claim (in effect a registration of freehold title over the land) to the new owners.

Johnston stated that a review of land claims was necessary because the proclamation of the protectorate had been followed by a wholesale land grab, with huge areas of land bought for trivial sums and many claims overlapping or requiring adjustment. He sought confirmation that the chiefs who sold the land and had received a fair price, but his estimates of land value were very low, from a halfpenny an acre up to a maximum of threepence an acre. The existing African villages and farms were exempted from these sales, and the villagers could retain their homes and fields under “non-disturbance” clauses in most Certificates of Claim.

When the legality of the Certificates of Claim system was challenged in 1903 on the basis that the agreements made by the chiefs breached the rights of their community members, the Appeals Court upheld their validity. The court did, however, rule that many aspects of the agreements made by the chiefs were unfair and one-sided, favouring the European parties.

In total, 59 Certificates of Claim to land rights were registered, mostly between 1892 and 1894, covering an area of 3.7 million acres, almost 1.5 million hectares or 15% of the total land area of the Protectorate. This included 2.7 million acres, over 1 million hectares, in the North Nyasa District, which the British South Africa Company had acquired because of its mineral potential, and very little of which was ever turned into plantations or estates. Most of the remaining alienated land, some 867,000 acres, or over 350,000 hectares of estates, included much of the best arable lands in the Shire Highlands, the most densely populated part of the country.

== Development of the Land Issue ==
Customary law had little legal status in the early colonial period, as in 1902 the Parliament of the United Kingdom provided that English Law would generally apply in the British Central Africa Protectorate, and that the Crown had sovereignty over all of the land in the protectorate. Landowners had a title to their land by virtue of a grant from the Crown, but any land which had not been so granted remained as Crown Land, which could be alienated in the future. Under this doctrine, African communities had no existing legal title to the land they occupied, and the colonial administration was free to grant away title to such land until 1936. At that time, it was recognised that much of the remaining Crown Land was unsuitable to be converted into estates and that there were few new European settlers and consequently little demand from new estates. The needs of African communities were given greater prominence and any further conversion of Crown Land to freehold was prohibited. In addition, from 1916, governors of Nyasaland had been able to reserve areas of Crown Land for the African people inhabiting it. These areas were termed “Native Trust Land”, to be held in trust by the British Secretary of State for the Colonies for the benefit of those African communities. The area of Native Trust Land was about 2.5 million acres. From 1936, Native Authorities appointed under the policy of Indirect Rule from among traditional chiefs and appointed headmen were given powers to allocate Trust Land to their communities in accordance with customary law.

John Chilembwe (1871–1915) was a Baptist minister, who returned to Nyasaland after education at the Virginia Theological Seminary and College, (now Virginia University of Lynchburg) in 1900 and founded the Providence Industrial Mission. Initially, Chilembwe avoided direct criticism of the colonial authorities, but after 1913 he had become more politically militant and openly criticised the government over African land rights and the conditions of tenants on European-owned estates. The outbreak and effects of the First World War was the key factor in moving him from vocal criticism to planning an uprising, which he believed would achieve the deliverance of his people. He planned to attack government centres and European estates in the Shire Highlands in January 1915. The plan failed almost completely; Chilembwe was killed and many of his followers were executed after summary trials under Martial law, but the uprising was a severe blow to the colonial authorities. For many years after the initial shock of the Chilembwe uprising, both the Nyasaland and British governments did little to deal with the problem of land grievances, despite recognising that this problem existed. Generally, the supposed needs of the European estate owners were given priority and legislation in 1917, 1928 and 1952 was overtly race-based, as it involved using the categories “Native” or “African” to determine legal rights.

The Land Commission of 1920 sought to address increasing African landlessness and recommended strict observance of the “non-disturbance” clauses contained in the Certificates of Claim. However, these clauses were largely ineffective, because landowners routinely ignored them and because the practice of shifting cultivation meant that the land occupied by tenants had changed since the time the certificate were issued.

Another aim of the 1920 Land Commission was to promote European agriculture by curbing the growing of economic crops by Africans where this competed with Europeans. It also aimed to restrict the amount of land reserved for those Africans living outside the estates to only as much as was currently sufficient for their use, with some allowance for future needs. The remainder was to become available to form small to medium size European plantations. Even though large areas of the original European estates were underdeveloped or completely unused, their owners were unwilling to sell surplus land to new European farmers except for unrealistically high prices, so the commission looked to 700,000 acres of Crown land that it considered was potentially available to create future estates for these expected incomers, mainly outside the Shire Highlands, which contained many existing estates. The commission also estimated that the African population of Nyasaland would double by 1950, but it considered that the very low estimate that 3.2 million acres of cultivable land, with appropriate pasturage, would be sufficient to feed this anticipated future population.

However, in 1924 the governor, Sir Charles Bowring, reported that Nyasaland was unsuitable for settlement by large numbers of Europeans. From then on, the dominant European voices in Nyasaland were those of its colonial civil servants, unlike in the Rhodesias, where the permanent settlers were predominant. This led to the Colonial Office rejecting the Land Commission's report to the extent it promoted further European settlement. To prevent large-scale evictions from private estates, Bowring also suggested that the Nyasaland government should acquire blocks of estate land of a sufficient size to accommodate those Africans who were resident on the estate. The Ormsby-Gore East African Commission of 1924 added that it was anomalous that the Nyasaland government was forcing African residents on estates in southern Nyasaland to accept obligations imposed by landowners which were not specified in the land titles. Similar claims to impose these additional burdens were not upheld by the same Nyasaland government in northern Nyasaland, and such claims were not even recognised by government of Northern Rhodesia. The main causes of discontent among tenants on private estates were their lack of security of tenure and the demands made on them to provide significant amounts labour in lieu of rent under the system known as thangata to which they were subject. The most urgent problem was that tenants did not have security of tenure rather than the levels of labour services or rent they faced. There was also a sense of grievance that Europeans were holding large tracts of undeveloped land while Africans were suffering land shortages.

The British government was not prepared to support Bowring's proposal or deal with the anomaly noted by Ormsby-Gore. Instead, legislation passed in Nyasaland in 1928, the Natives on Private Estates Ordinance 1928, provided that each African resident in an estate was entitled to a hut site and a plot of cultivable land, in return for which they had either to work for the landowner for wages or in lieu of rent, or to grow economic crops to give the owner in lieu of rent. This measure failed in practice as it did not provide a permanent solution satisfactory either to estate owners or tenants, particularly during the worldwide economic depression of the early 1930s. The 1938 Bell Report noted that many estate owners had little need of tenants’ labour and could not pay them wages or purchase the crops they produced. Some of these tenants were obliged to find work outside their estate to pay their rents in cash.

During the Second World War and after, the Nyasaland government faced increasing African opposition. Many grievances came from the tenants on European-owned estates who increasingly resented the imposition of thangata, originally a form of labour rent but now often a form of sharecropping. Not only was thangata itself hated, but several estate managers increased tensions by denying the sons-in-law of existing tenants the right to settle in accordance with former practice, delaying payment of wages, demanding that tenants grow cash crops rather than food or by large-scale evictions. Smallholders living on Native Trust Land often suffered overcrowding, made worse by new methods of cultivation and soil conservation advocated by the colonial Agricultural Department and the eviction of former estate tenants. African smallholders widely opposed the imposition of rules designed to limit soil erosion which involved them in considerable extra labour, so the department decided to use compulsion to enforce these rules.

In 1942, many hundreds of African tenants were served with notices to quit in 1943. In the Blantyre District hundreds refused to leave since there was no other land for them. Two years later the same difficulty arose in the densely populated Cholo District, two-thirds of whose land constituted private estates. Eviction notices served on 1,250 tenants were resisted, and the government was forced to intervene to reduce the figure of those actually removed to one-tenth of the number served with notices.

After the Second World War, it became clearer to the British government that its African colonies were moving towards self-government at a faster pace than previously envisaged, so the condition of African residents on the estates could no longer be ignored. African political consciousness was growing and unused and under-used estate land could no longer be justified by an appeal to dubious 19th century claims. The increasing disturbances made resolution more urgent, and a commission of enquiry was set up.

== Abrahams Commission ==
Abrahams spent around 10 weeks in Nyasaland in 1946, taking evidence from colonial officials, estate owners and settlers, missionaries, African politicians and chiefs, and visiting almost all parts of the protectorate. He submitted his report in October 1946 and it was published in early 1947. Abrahams identified the main problem was the conflicting African and European concepts of land ownership. In addition, many European landowners either acted illegally towards tenants or exercised their rights harshly and without consideration of customary practices. In part, this was because the system set up following the 1928 Natives on Private Estates Ordinance neither provided the owners with a reliable pool of labour nor enabled them to reduce the numbers living on their estates. Many African tenants, in Abrahams’ view, failed to understand their obligations or the limits on their legal rights. Many Africans living on Native Trust Land felt strong resentment at the large areas of under-used estate land.

European owners wanted rent in cash, kind or labour at their discretion and the ability to select tenants and workers, evicting those they did not want, without reference to any customs that restricted these objectives. Africans wanted to occupy estate land under the same conditions as Trust Land: rent-free, without any obligation to provide labour or sell crops to the estate owner, and following traditional customs. Abrahams saw these views as irreconcilable and considered that African residents in estates should be “emancipated”, free to leave the estate and be resettled on Trust Land or to stay on terms negotiated with the owner, not imposed by legislation. This could not be done while much Native Trust Land was overcrowded, so he suggested that the unused and under-used estate land should be acquired for the re-settlement of those leaving estates and also to accommodate some of the excess population already on Trust Land. Abrahams thought that the majority of estate residents would choose to leave, so the owners could then develop the remaining largely unoccupied parts of their estates.

Between Abrahams’ visit to Nyasaland and the publication of his report, Edmund Richards, the governor from 1942 to 1947, strongly advocated to the Colonial Office that the Nyasaland government should purchase the Magomero estate of A L Bruce Estates, a single block of approximately 162,000 acres surrounded by very congested areas of Native Trust Land. The Colonial Office was only prepared to allow the Nyasaland government to offer five shillings an acre, a high price for land which a government survey showed had been over-used and deforested, but too low to be acceptable to the owner.

Both the Abrahams report and the earlier Bell report considered that the resolution of the land issue should have been a policy priority for the Nyasaland and British governments. However, neither Kittermaster, who was governor from 1934 to 1939, nor Mackenzie-Kennedy, his successor until 1942, was able to take any significant action. Their successor, Richards, supported Abraham's suggestions but left Nyasaland in early 1947, so it was left to Colby to give effect to Abraham's proposals. The first problem was that these were of a general nature and not based on any detailed surveys of the estates. The second was that Colby believed that compulsory purchase would alienate resident Europeans, deter future European investment and increase racial tensions.

== Aftermath of the Abrahams Report ==
As a result of the Abrahams report, the Nyasaland government set up a Land Planning Committee of civil servants in 1947 to advise on implementing its proposals and deal with the acquisition of land for re-settlement. Its original official members co-opted six representatives of the estate owners and six missionaries, but no Africans, although it took evidence from several chiefs. The committee realised the difficulty of its task, and considered it would be expensive and time-consuming to complete. However, it was pressed to achieve results and decided to concentrate on the Shire Highlands. The committee did not go as far as Abrahams proposed, and its guiding principle was that land should be put to the best use possible, whether as working estates or African farmland. It recommended that government should only re-acquire land which was either undeveloped or occupied by large numbers of African residents or tenants. On the other hand, land capable of future “European development” (the phrase used by the Land Planning Committee) should be “protected against indiscriminate settlement and unorganised cultivation” (in Abraham's words).

The main problem was that those areas where the Native Trust Land was most overcrowded were also those where there was the least available under-used land on estates. If the most under-utilised estate land were acquired for resettlement, it would involve the significant population movement of those residents leaving estates. The Land Planning Committee advocated compulsory resettlement to distant areas if necessary. Another problem was that, if parts of smaller estates were earmarked for resettlement, the remaining parts might not be economically viable: this meant that the whole estate would have to be bought. This difficulty had not been foreseen by Abrahams. The committee was conscious of the political repercussions that might arise if African expectations were not met.

The land it thought should be acquired included about two-thirds of the land held by the British Central Africa Company, most of which had never been developed. The committee's official members expected that the major estate owners, whose representatives they had co-opted, would be willing to sell parts of their land voluntarily. However, both A L Bruce Estates Ltd and particularly the British Central Africa Company Ltd proved very reluctant to comply. The committee considered that the local management of the British Central Africa Company did not realise how discontented its tenants were, nor that it needed to sell much of its estates, but it did not wish to acquire the company's land compulsorily.

The programme accelerated after 1951, and within six years the government had re-acquired most of the land it had targeted by negotiated purchase. By June 1954, 350,000 acres had been re-acquired leaving only 3.7% of land in the protectorate in estates. At independence in 1964, this had been reduced to less than 2% per cent. The Abrahams report stated that, in 1946, 173,000 Africans in 49,000 families were resident on estates. Land acquisition and re-settlement reduced this to 9,000 families by 1962, most of which had opted to stay as workers or tenants on the estates when offered re-settlement, often at some distance from their estate.

A L Bruce Estates Ltd was under-capitalised, but before the 1940s it had refused to sell off any of its land to raise new funds. However, in 1945, the company announced it wished to sell its main estate, and the governor felt it was necessary to negotiate to buy it, even though it had been badly managed and deforested. Bruce Estates wanted a price sufficient to wipe out all its past losses since 1925, but this was considered excessive, and in 1947 the company tried to sell its land to a private buyer, but the sale fell through. Some of the A L Bruce Estates land was sold to private buyers, but the government's need for land for re-settlement after the 1949 famine caused it to restart negotiations with the company in 1952. Around 75,000 acres was bought by the government, much of which was of poor quality.

In 1948, the British Central Africa Company Ltd was unwilling to sell the better parts of its land to the government. However, it was prepared to sell inferior land, and in 1948 the government bought freehold land from the company in the Chingale area in the western part of Zomba District to convert it into land held by customary tenure and resettle Africans evacuated from other estates in the Shire valley and highlands on it. The Chingale resettlement scheme took place from 1948 to 1954. Following a serious famine in 1949, Geoffrey Colby, the Governor of Nyasaland from 1948 to 1956, attempted to get this company to sell its under-used land to the government for resettlement. However, Colby made it clear he would not use the compulsory purchase powers he had been granted, preferring voluntary agreement. By ruling compulsion out, he gave unintended encouragement to the British Central Africa Company's plans to retain its estates. In 1955, the Nyasaland government agreed to purchase almost 36,470 acres in Cholo District with 24,600 residents from the British Central Africa Company for resettlement. Before this, the company had owned 74,262 acres with 36,400 residents. The company retained 38,143 acres, but of the 11,800 residents, 3,240 were moved onto Crown lands. It was only in 1962, when independence was clearly in prospect, that the company accepted the need to sell its surplus land, retaining only its most profitable assets.

While the 1950s saw the beginnings of the policy of actually re-acquiring lands for African occupation, it was only in the 1960s that the programme was completed and schemes for the allocation of land acquired to be formulated. In the 1940s aggrieved African residents objected to having to pay rent to the estate owners, as their counterparts on African Trust Lands lived rent free. They complained of a reduction in the size of their gardens and of the difficulties experienced by their children in building their own huts and starting new gardens. On the other hand, the planters in the Cholo Tea Association complained of shortages of labour, which they claimed was due to the increase of income in the villages through increased wages, financial assistance from relatives working abroad and the proceeds from the sale of cash crops. There was a conflict of interests: “. . . natives feel they have a strong customary right to settle their families in their home village, while on the other hand the landlord would do anything to contest that he was legally obliged to find accommodation on his land for the descendants of his tenants.”

Abrahams reached the conclusion that the only solution was to end the status of resident native, leaving him free to quit the estate or to stay there on terms satisfactory both to himself and the landlord, substituting contractual rights for statutory ones. The 1948 Land Planning Committee of senior civil servants did not wholly agree with Abraham's recommendations, holding the view that 'African and European enterprise in Nyasaland are complementary and inter-dependent; neither can progress without the goodwill of the other; both must be prepared to co-operate for their mutual benefit and progress'. Under this two-fold policy land could still, under certain conditions, be alienated to non-Africans.

The main provisions of the Africans on Private Estates Ordinance, 1952 were that the presence of all resident Africans on estates was to be legalised; a register was to be kept of all resident Africans and every resident was entitled to that extent of cultivable land already under his crops at the time of the implementation of the Ordinance in 1952. The quinquennial period of evictions was abolished, and future evictions could only take place if approved by an Arbitration Board consisting of three representatives of estate owners and three Africans, under the chairmanship of the Provincial Commissioner. However, the resident's land could be taken away if not put to good use. There were other details which provided for controlled rent, graduated rent for females, the right of unmarried women who were daughters of a resident to permanent residence (a resident's son, however, could only remain on an estate after reaching the age of eighteen with the owner's permission) and for the growing by Africans of cash crops only by contract with the owner.

== Sources ==
- Baker, Colin (1993). Seeds of Trouble: Government Policy and Land Rights in Nyasaland, 1946–1964. London: British Academic Press. ISBN 978-1-85043-615-7.
- Baker, Colin (1994). Development Governor: A Biography of Sir Geoffrey Colby. London: British Academic Press. ISBN 978-1-85043-616-4.
- Barber, William J. (1961). The Economy of British Central Africa: A Case Study of Economic Development in a Dualistic Society. Stanford University Press. ISBN 978-0-8047-0189-1.
- Johnston, Sir Harry H. (1897). British Central Africa: An Attempt to give some Account of a Portion of the Territories under British Influence North of the Zambezi. New York: Edward Arnold.
- Kandawire, J.A.K. (1977). "Thangata in Pre-Colonial and Colonial Systems of Land Tenure in Southern Malawi, with Special Reference to Chingale". Africa: Journal of the International African Institute. 47 (2): 185–191. doi:10.2307/1158737. JSTOR 1158737. S2CID 146188640.
- Kettlewell, R.W. (1960). Agricultural Change in Nyasaland: 1945-1960 (PDF) (Report). pp. 229–285.
- "Land Tenure (Nyasaland)". Hansard, Commons Debates, vol 423 columns 194-5. 29 May 1946.
- McCracken, John (2012). A History of Malawi, 1859–1966. James Currey. ISBN 978-1-84701-050-6.
- "Nyasaland (Land Policy)". Hansard, Commons Debates, vol 387 columns 1175-6. 17 March 1943.
- "Nyasaland (Economic Development)". Hansard, Commons Debates, vol 526 columns 361-3. 15 April 1954.
- Nyasaland Protectorate (1920). Report of the Land Commission under Judge Jackson (Report). Zomba: Government printer.
- Pachai, Bridglal (October 1973). "Land Policies in Malawi: An Examination of the Colonial Legacy". The Journal of African History. 14 (4): 681–698. doi:10.1017/S0021853700013116. S2CID 162918655.
- Pachai, Bridglal (1978). Land and politics in Malawi, 1875-1975. Kingston, Ontario: Limestone Press. ISBN 9780919642829.
- Palmer, Robin (1986). "Working conditions and worker responses on Nyasaland tea estates, 1930-1953". Journal of African History. 27 (1): 105–126. doi:10.1017/S0021853700029224. JSTOR 181339. S2CID 161274415.
- Pike, John G. (1968). Malawi: A Political and Economic History. London: Pall Mall Press. ISBN 978-0-269-67214-9.
- Shepperson, George; Price, Thomas (1958). Independent African: John Chilembwe and the origins, setting, and significance of the Nyasaland native rising of 1915. Edinburgh University Press.
- Silungwe, Chikosa Mozesi (April 2009). "Customary land tenure reform and development: a critique of customary land tenure reform under Malawi's National Land Policy". Law, Social Justice and Global Development Journal.
- Tangri, Roger (1971). "Some New Aspects of the Nyasaland Native Rising of 1915". African Historical Studies. 4 (2): 305–313. doi:10.2307/216419. JSTOR 216419.
- Tenney, Sarah; Humphreys, Norman K. (2011). Historical Dictionary of the International Monetary Fund. Lanham, Maryland: Scarecrow Press. ISBN 978-0-8108-7531-9.
- Report of the Commission Appointed to Enquire into the Financial Position and Further Development of Nyasaland (Report). London: UK Colonial Office. 1938.
- White, Landeg (1987). Magomero: Portrait of an African Village. Cambridge University Press. ISBN 978-0-521-38909-9.
