= Nyasaland emergency of 1959 =

State of emergency declared in Nyasaland from March 1959 to June 1960

- Date: 3 March 1959 – 16 June 1960
- Location: Nyasaland, Federation of Rhodesia and Nyasaland
- Result: British/Rhodesian-Nyasaland victory: Leading Nyasaland African Congress members arrested; Nyasaland African Congress suppressed

Parties
United Kingdom: Federation of Rhodesia and Nyasaland	Nyasaland African Congress

Lead figures
(United Kingdom) Robert Armitage; Roy Welensky	Hastings Banda; Henry Chipembere; Kanyama Chiume; Dunduzu Chisiza; Yatuta Chisiza

Casualties and losses
- 51 killed, 79 injured, 3,300 arrested

The Nyasaland emergency of 1959 was a state of emergency in the protectorate of Nyasaland (now Malawi), which was declared by its governor, Sir Robert Armitage, on 3 March 1959 and which ended on 16 June 1960. Under the emergency powers that operated during the Emergency, over 1,300 members or supporters of the Nyasaland African Congress (Congress) were detained without trial, and most of the party's leaders including its president, Dr. Hastings Banda, were imprisoned in Southern Rhodesia after being arrested on 3 March. Many other Africans were jailed for offences related to the Emergency, including rioting and criminal damage. In the week before the Emergency was declared and during its first month, over 50 Africans were killed and many more wounded by the colonial security forces, which included many European troops from Southern Rhodesia. Others were beaten by troops or armed police or had their huts destroyed and their property seized during punitive operations undertaken during the Emergency.

Nyasaland had a history of problems arising from the limited access that African peasant farmers had to agricultural land, and of opposition to the Federation of Rhodesia and Nyasaland, which Nyasaland had joined in 1953. Although opposition to Federation was at first limited to a relatively small group of educated Africans, the imposition of agricultural rules designed to reduce soil erosion, which took significant amounts of land out of cultivation and involved additional work by the smallholders affected, made it more widely unpopular. On his return to Nyasaland, Banda used dissatisfaction with these schemes to spread his message that Nyasaland should leave the Federation.

The stated aim of the State of Emergency was to allow the Nyasaland government to restore law and order after the increase in lawlessness following Dr Banda's return to the protectorate in July 1958. However, it is clear from government documents released in the 1990s that the British Colonial Office took the view that, if Nyasaland were to remain in the Federation, Banda and the Congress had to be neutralised and that the Federal Government under its Prime Minister Roy Welensky wished to ensure that African nationalists, in Northern Rhodesia and Southern Rhodesia as well as Nyasaland, would not interfere with his plans to achieve Dominion status for the Federation and reduce British influence in its two northern territories following a constitutional review due in 1960.

After a short initial period of rioting, damage to property and strikes after the Emergency was declared, most of the strikers returned to work and Nyasaland became calm but tense, apart from remote areas in the Northern Region, where resistance continued for several months. This unrest was countered by a campaign of harassment by troops and police, including hut burning, arbitrary fines and beatings. However, Armitage had no plans to resolve the political crisis in Nyasaland, other than expecting that the elimination of Banda and Congress would allow alternative politicians willing to cooperate with the colonial government to emerge. Instead, the Malawi Congress Party was formed as the successor to the banned Nyasaland African Congress in August 1959 and rapidly grew into a larger mass-movement than Congress had been. By the end of 1959, the new Colonial Secretary, Iain Macleod realised that he would have to negotiate with Banda and that such negotiations would involve ending the Emergency, releasing the remaining detainees, and Nyasaland's eventual withdrawal from the Federation.

Armitage strongly resisted Macleod's proposals, particularly the release of Banda and other former Congress leaders, and it was unlikely that he would be able to negotiate effectively with Banda on constitutional progress. Because of his strong opposition to the release of Banda and others and their return to Nyasaland if they were released, British ministers decided to nominate Armitage's successor on 1 April 1960, the same day that Banda was released. The State of Emergency ended on 16 June 1960: Armitage was seen as an obstacle to progress, and he left Nyasaland permanently in August 1960.

At the end of 1958, the Colonial Office had concluded that allowing Congress to continue as a legal political party under Banda's leadership was incompatible with the continued existence of the Federation, so it decided to eliminate Congress using emergency powers. Within a year, it reached a similar conclusion regarding the Malawi Congress Party and Federation, but in view of the strength of African opposition, it decided that Federation could only be imposed on Nyasaland through the use of significant force for an indefinite period, something that the British government was not prepared to do.

== Background ==
=== Land issues ===
The violent uprising of John Chilembwe in 1915 was an expression of the frustration of educated Africans denied an effective political voice and of the grievances of ordinary Africans denied a share in the benefits of the colonial economy as well as of religious radicalism. After the Chilembwe uprising, protests against colonial rule were muted and concentrated on economic and social improvement for Africans, with political advancement a distant aspiration. However, a 1930 declaration by the British government that white settlers north of the Zambezi could not form minority governments able to dominate local Africans stimulated political awareness. In the 1940s and early 1950s, the most pressing problem was African access to land. Between 1892 and 1894, about 15% of the total land area of the Nyasaland, including some 867,000 acres, or over 350,000 hectares of the best land in the Shire Highlands, the most densely populated part of the country, had been turned into European-owned estates. Africans living on these estates were required to pay rent, normally satisfied by their undertaking agricultural work for the owner under the system known as thangata, which later developed into a form of sharecropping in some areas.

For many years, neither the Nyasaland government nor the British government had dealt with African land grievances, despite recognising that a problem existed. Generally, the supposed needs of the estate owners were given priority. Thangata was regulated by the Natives on Private Estates Ordinance 1928. However, this allowed landowners to evict up to 10% of residents at five-yearly intervals. It did not provide a permanent solution, as it did not deal with the problem of estate land that was under-utilised but not available to African farmers, nor with the owners' ability to evict tenants. The legislation was overtly race-based, as it used the category of "Native" (or African) to determine land rights. There were no large-scale evictions in 1933 and few in 1938, but in 1943 hundreds of families in the Blantyre District refused to leave their tenancies as there was nowhere for them to go, and the colonial authorities declined to use force. The evictions due in 1948 were suspended because of a serious famine: they took place in 1950 but were resisted.

Tensions between estate owners and tenants remained high during the early 1950s. In the overcrowded Cholo district, the British Central Africa Company treated tenants on its tea estates harshly, and there were riots there in 1945. Between 1950 and 1953, the company tried to evict about 1,250 tenants and increase the rents of the remainder. Many refused to pay rent or taxes and occupied land on undeveloped parts of company estates. Serious riots broke out in Cholo in August 1953, leading to the death of eleven people and the injury of seventy-two. The Abrahams Commission (also known as the 1946 Land Commission) was appointed by the Nyasaland government in 1946 to inquire into land issues in Nyasaland following riots and disturbances by tenants on European-owned estates in Blantyre districts in 1943 and 1945. Abrahams proposed that the Nyasaland government should purchase all unused or under-used freehold land on the estates, which would become Crown land allocated to African smallholders as Native Trust Land. Africans on the estates were to be offered the choice of remaining there as workers or tenants, or of moving to Crown land. The programme of land acquisition accelerated after 1951, and by 1957 the government had negotiated the purchase of most of the land it had targeted. By June 1954, 350,000 acres had been re-acquired, leaving only 3.7% of Nyasaland's land in private estates. At independence in 1964, this had been reduced to less than 2% per cent.

=== Political issues ===
In the same period that the economic position of Nyasaland's Africans was improving, their political aspirations received a major set-back. Agitation by the government of Southern Rhodesia led to a Royal Commission, the Bledisloe Commission, on the future association between Southern Rhodesia, Northern Rhodesia and Nyasaland. Despite almost unanimous African opposition, its report in 1939 did not rule out some form of future association, provided that Southern Rhodesian forms of racial discrimination were not applied north of the Zambezi. The danger of Southern Rhodesian rule made demands for African political rights more urgent, and in 1944 James Frederick Sangala promoted the union of various local African associations in the protectorate into the Nyasaland African Congress. One of its first demands was to have African representation on the Legislative Council, which advised governors on local legislation. Before 1949, African interests were represented on this council by a single white missionary, but in 1949, three Africans were nominated by the governor to sit on the Legislative Council.

From 1946, the Nyasaland African Congress received financial and political support from Hastings Banda, then living in Britain. Despite this support, Congress grew slowly at first, until it was reanimated by new Southern Rhodesian proposals for amalgamation and a decrease in membership fees. By 1953 it had around 5,000 members. Post-war British governments of both main parties agreed to a federal solution for Central Africa, not the full amalgamation that the Southern Rhodesian government preferred, and the Federation of Rhodesia and Nyasaland was pushed through in 1953 against very strong African opposition. The main African objections to the Federation were summed up in a joint memorandum prepared by Hastings Banda for Nyasaland and Harry Nkumbula for Northern Rhodesia in 1951. These were that political domination by the white minority of Southern Rhodesia would prevent greater African political participation and that control by Southern Rhodesian politicians would lead to an extension of racial discrimination and segregation. After the Federation was imposed, the Nyasaland African Congress promoted a campaign of non-violent resistance. However, the Nyasaland government reacted to the Cholo disturbances of August and September 1953, where the Congress campaign may have been a factor in addition to local land issues, by threatening the President of Congress and forcing him to end it. This lost Congress much of its support and its membership fell to only four or five hundred until the party's revival in 1956.

== Prelude ==
=== Congress radicalised ===
In 1955, the Colonial Office agreed to the suggestion of the Governor, Geoffrey Colby, that African representation on Nyasaland's Legislative Council should be increased from three to five members, and that the African members should no longer be appointed by the governor, but nominated by Provincial Councils. These councils were largely composed of chiefs but, as their members were receptive to popular wishes, this allowed the Provincial Councils to nominate Congress members to the Legislative Council. In 1956, Henry Chipembere and Kanyama Chiume, two young radical members of Congress, were nominated together with three moderates who broadly supported Congress aims. This success led to rapid growth in Congress membership in 1956 and 1957. Between April 1956 and October 1957, a concerted recruitment drive increased party membership from around 1,000 to over 13,000.

Several of the younger members of the Nyasaland African Congress had little faith in the ability of its leader, T D T Banda, who had only succeeded the veteran Congress leader James Frederick Sangala in January 1957, because of his weak performance when discussing possible constitutional changes with a government representative in September and October 1957. They also accused of dishonesty in misappropriating Congress funds, and wished to replace him with Dr Hastings Banda then living in the Gold Coast. Dr Banda announced he would only return if given the presidency of Congress: after this was agreed he returned to Nyasaland in July 1958 and T D T Banda was ousted. Dr Banda was absolutely opposed to the Federation, but otherwise quite moderate and far less radical than the younger Congress members.

Although the Nyasaland African Congress was at first based in Blantyre, many branches were established in the Northern Province after 1955. Schemes to prevent cutting down and burning trees to assist the cultivation of finger millet, and to restrict the numbers of cattle owned, had begun in that region in 1938, but from 1947 they were increasingly enforced through fines. From 1951, unpaid work on schemes designed to prevent soil erosion was imposed by the Nyasaland government. Resistance to these measures created a climate of rural radicalism in the Congress branches in the Northern Region, which organised a campaign of sabotaging rural conservation schemes. A wider campaign of demonstrations, many leading to riots, started before the State of Emergency was declared. These intensified after 3 March, particularly in Karonga District, where armed Congress supporters evaded arrest by the small numbers of local police with the active support of the local population. Outside the Northern Province, rural support for Congress was patchy, being strong in the Cholo and Lower Shire districts in the Southern Province and Nkhotakota District in the Central Province but weak elsewhere. In Blantyre and other towns, Congress attracted young, marginalised men ready to participate in demonstrations.

=== Banda’s influence ===
On his return to Nyasaland, Banda made clear his implacable opposition to the Federation, which ran counter to Welensky's intention, declared in 1957, to reduce British influence in the two northern Federation territories and press for Dominion status for the Federation as early as 1960. Banda also sought self-government rather than immediate independence. In the nine months between his return and the declaration of a State of Emergency, Banda combined opposition to the Federation with more popular causes, such as the African smallholders' dislike of agricultural practices imposed on them to promote soil conservation and also the remnants of thangata. Banda's strategy was to use these popular issues to mobilise Congress supporters into strikes, demonstrations, disobedience and non-violent protests that would disrupt the everyday operation of the colonial government.

Up to late October 1958, the leadership of Congress did not promote or endorse violent action by its members and was in constitutional discussions with the Nyasaland government that gave some promise of African political advancement. However, when the new Head of Police Special Branch arrived in Nyasaland in September 1958, one of his first tasks was to update a list, originally prepared in June, of those to be arrested if a State of Emergency were declared. The Colonial Office's rejection of Armitage's very limited proposals for reform and, from late October, increasingly aggressive Congress demonstrations directed against Europeans and Asians and intimidation of African opponents increased tensions.

=== Increasing unrest ===
At the end of 1958, Banda and other Congress leader attended an All-African People's Conference in Accra, in recently-independent Ghana and they returned to Nyasaland determined to press for constitutional change When the Federation of Rhodesia and Nyasaland was set up in 1953, provision had been made for the Federal Constitution to be reviewed in 1960, including a review of which territories it would include, and Banda wanted to ensure an African, and hopefully NAC, majority on the Legislative Council, one of the bodies which would review Nyasaland's continued membership of the Federation.

Sir Robert Armitage, who had become governor in April 1956, was not opposed to limited constitutional development, envisaging autonomy for Nyasaland with the Federation, with African majority rule at some future date, but not in the immediate future. His constitutional proposals of October 1958 ignored Banda's demands that Nyasaland's Africans should have adequate representation on the bodies to be involved in the 1960 constitutional talks on the Federation's future. Although Banda was willing to make concessions on a future electoral franchise, he was strongly opposed to proposals that massively over-represented the tiny minority of Europeans and Asians. Armitage's proposals were for 15 out of 29 seats on the Legislative Council to be filled by officials, with only 14 other members elected under a complex voting system that would probably mean 6 of the 14 elected seats would be filled by Europeans. However, Alan Lennox-Boyd, the Colonial Secretary rejected any plan for local autonomy for Nyasaland and the proposals for elections to the Legislative Council and, in early January 1959, the Colonial Office made it clear that the protectorate would not be allowed to secede from the Federation nor to proceed toward self-government with an African majority in its legislature for a lengthy period. In consequence, it suggested that Banda and Congress would have to be neutralised to ensure that neither of these eventualities would arise.

Both the Nyasaland government and Congress were convinced that time was running out. Armitage felt that the protectorate was becoming ungovernable, but Banda saw delay as assisting Welensky to achieve his aim of making Federation permanent and free of British oversight. In the first days of January 1959, Banda presented the Congress further proposals on constitutional reform to the governor, Armitage. These were for an African majority in the Legislative Council and at least parity with non-Africans in the Executive Council. As this would inevitably lead to a demand for withdrawal from the Federation, the governor refused. When the constitutional talks ended in apparent stalemate early in January 1959, Henry Chipembere and Kanyama Chiume led to demands within Congress for an escalation of anti-government protests and a more aggressive campaign of disobedience. Their programme proposed active disobedience to colonial laws and demonstrations which would lead to arrests, to be followed by protests in favour of those arrested and the arrest of those protestors, and the intimidation of, and sometimes assaults on, police and government workers trying to enforce the laws, in a cycle designed to cause chaos.

Even after the stalling of his talks with the Nyasaland government, Banda had to decide on whether to try to achieve constitutional advance through the intervention of the British government or by direct and increasingly violent action. Immediately after the talks broke up, Armitage had proposed that Lennox-Boyd should visit Nyasaland, but Lennox-Boyd suggested on 4 February 1959 that Lord Perth, the Minister of State for Colonial Affairs should visit East Africa in early March. However, by mid-February, action by Congress supporters became more violent and statements by its leading activists were increasingly inflammatory so the governor's choices were to carry on with the visit by Lord Perth in the hope that the discussions would help to lower the political temperature, or declare a State of Emergency. As late as 18 February, Armitage was still hopeful that a meeting between Lord Perth and Banda would go ahead, and noted that the Special Branch report on a murder plot was based on second-hand information, but he decided against offering concessions soon after, and, after discussions with Roy Welensky the Prime Minister of the Federation, he advised the Colonial Office on 26 February to cancel Lord Perth's visit. Even before this, he made preparations for mass arrests.

Armitage first asked for police reinforcements from Northern Rhodesia and Tanganyika, then on 18 February for the battalion of the King's African Rifles based in Northern Rhodesia to be transferred to Nyasaland to strengthen the locally based battalion: this arrived on 26 February After consulting the Federal Prime Minister, Welensky, and Southern Rhodesia Premier, Edgar Whitehead, and with the approval of the Colonial Office, over 1,000 Southern Rhodesian troops were then sent to Nyasaland. These included European troops of the Rhodesia Regiment, the first of which arrived by plane on 27 and 28 February and two companies of the Rhodesia African Rifles. Both Armitage and Welensky wanted to use white Southern Rhodesian troops in the likely areas of conflict, even if they were barely trained conscripts, while keeping the experienced and professional King's African Rifles and other African soldiers in reserve, as they both feared a mutiny by black soldiers.

This was not Armitage's first contact with Emergency powers. He had previously been Governor of Cyprus and had there been discouraged by the Colonial Office from declaring a State of Emergency in response to the EOKA insurrection and campaign of assassination, which broke out in April 1955. Armitage, nervous of loss of control, wanted to "nip trouble in the bud" there by detaining leading members of EOKA, and he later did so under a Detention of Persons Law without any formal State of Emergency.

=== The "murder plot" ===
In deciding to make widespread arrests, covering almost the whole Congress organisation, Armitage said he was influenced by reports of a secret meeting of Congress leaders (held in Banda's absence) on 25 January 1959, which approved a policy of strikes, retaliation against police violence, sabotage and defiance of the government. One agent code-named Baker, who claimed to have been present, confirmed that a campaign of violence had been discussed, as did a second, who was not present. These two reports were discussed with the Federal Intelligence and Security Bureau, which prepared a report for the Federal Prime Minister, Welensky, on 10 February. A further report from an African opponent of Banda that Congress planned his assassination and a detailed report by another police informer on 11 February, who claimed that a local Congress chairman had briefed him on the plan for systematic killings on "R-day", if Banda were arrested, were also made.

These two later pieces of information from informants not present at the meeting, rather than the earlier and less specific reports, were the basis for the claim by the Commissioner of Police that the meeting had planned the indiscriminate killing of Europeans and Asians, and of those Africans opposed to Congress, the so-called "murder plot". Whatever inflammatory rhetoric may have been used by Congress leaders, there is no evidence that they planned to match their words with actions. However, Banda and his colleagues refused to condemn the violent actions of Congress members, which were increasingly directed toward Africans who failed to support Congress, who the party denounced as "stooges".

There is uncertainty about what the Nyasaland and British governments considered was the true extent of the murder plot. The Commissioner of Police reported to the Governor on 18 February that:

"The Nyasaland African Congress has prepared plans for the mass murder throughout the Protectorate of all foreigners, by which is meant all Europeans and Asians, men, women and children, to take place in the event of Dr Banda being killed, arrested or abducted."

This report also claimed that African "quislings" would be murdered, and attached a more detailed report from the Head of Special Branch to the Police Commissioner stating that, in the event of Banda being neutralised, an "R-Day" was planned for the murder of the governor, senior civil servants, missionaries and other Europeans, and of Asians, including women and children, and that the plan was to be communicated to Congress Party branch chairmen and secretaries throughout Nyasaland.

Armitage forwarded the Commissioner's report to the Colonial office on 19 February, with a covering note referring to a deteriorating security situation, including demonstrations, illegal meetings and minor disorders as part of Congress programme agreed at the meeting of 25 January, but his note made no mention of plans for killing Europeans. Subsequently, Lennox-Boyd said in the House of Commons on 3 March 1959 that he had seen information which made it clear:

"plans had been made by Congress to carry out widespread violence and murder of Europeans, Asians and moderate African leaders; that, in fact, a massacre was being planned. "

Julian Amery, the Under-Secretary of State at the Colonial Office, used the words "massacre" and "bloodbath" later in the same debate.

The Special Branch report was forwarded separately to the Colonial Office Intelligence and Security Department (ISD), whose head considered it on 25 February. His assessment was that there was no evidence that Congress had started to act on the more extreme plans reported and that, until 20 February, Banda was still hopeful that a proposed meeting with Lord Perth, the Minister of State for Colonial Affairs would lead to useful constitutional discussions. It was the cancellation of this meeting, according to this assessment, that led Congress to begin an all-out campaign of violent action. The British ISD believed that the information obtained by the Nyasaland Special Branch about plans for violence were broadly accurate, although it recognised that it was the actual violence that Congress members were already engaged in, not any hypothetical murder plot, that provoked Armitage to declare an Emergency.

During the debate House of Commons debate of 3 March 1958, it was claimed by the opposition that the allegations of a murder plot were "cooked up", and Cuthbert Alport, Minister of State at the Commonwealth Relations Office advised on 10 March that more evidence of this plot must be obtained. An ISD operative visited Nyasaland shortly after the Emergency was declared and, on 31 March, reported that he had a dossier of evidence, some obtained from detainees. The key witness was a Congress member, Thomas Karua, who was present at the meeting as a Congress employee and who had been detained on 3 March. He provided what ISD considered was a detailed and accurate statement, corroborated by other witnesses, Karua subsequently repudiated his statement and appeared before the Delvin Commission in London.

The Nyasaland Police Special Branch in 1959 comprised eight European officers and between 20 and 30 African ones. It was the latter, not the Europeans, who recruited and managed a number of undercover informers; each informer reporting directly and exclusively to a particular African officer, who they owed their loyalty to. At most, one informant was present at the secret meeting of 25 January 1959; other informants’ reported at second hand, and the Head of the Special Branch reporting to Armitage was four or five removes from anyone that had spoken at the meeting. As the minutes of evidence taken by the Devlin Commission were destroyed for reasons of confidentiality by the Commission's Secretary soon after its Report was published, and not copied to the Colonial Office or Nyasaland government, what details of the supposed "murder plot" it heard from informants are now unclear. However, the disparity between the vague reports of police informers, translations of which were appended to the Commission's Report, and the unqualified assertion of the Commissioner of Police, supported by the report of the Head of Special Branch, of a plot for the indiscriminate killing of all Europeans and Asians has led to speculation that the murder plot was a Special Branch fabrication.

The Nyasaland government took no immediate action against Banda or other Congress leaders, and continued to negotiate with them until late February. The governor also made no specific reference to the "murder plot" until after his declaration of a State of Emergency had failed to restore order quickly. The Devlin Commission later asked whether it would have been better for the government to have published its belief in the murder plot before taking that action, as there was substantial measure of disbelief about the plot when it was publicly mentioned only after the arrests had taken place.

No European or Asian was killed from the date of the secret Congress meeting until the Emergency ended, although there were several opportunities for crowds of Congress supporters to do so, and no reports of serious injuries to European or Asian civilians. Six non-fatal injuries to members of the security force were recorded during the Emergency, against 149 fatal and non-fatal recorded among insurgents and civilians. However, Congress intolerance of African support for the Federation or even moderation, both regarded as treachery, had been evident at all levels up to and including Banda. Although this did not lead to killings, there were physical assaults, threats to kill and the destruction of, or damage to, the homes and property of dissenters, and many local Congress branches drew up lists of "stooges" to be targeted. Although Congress leaders denied to the Commissioners that they planned to massacre Europeans, they did not deny they contemplated aggressive action against Africans who did not supporting their cause or violent resistance to police action.

Armitage did not believe that a coldly calculated plan worked out in detail and in advance by the equivalent of a military staff did exist. However, he did believe that there might have been some plan for violent action, possibly including the assassination of him and senior European members of the Legislative Council and Civil Service, and that he had to take action to deal with any contingency made possible by the plans that the clandestine Congress bush meeting might have made.

== The Emergency declared ==
=== The Nyasaland emergency ===
After the breakdown of talks in late February, Armitage made preparations for a State of Emergency in Nyasaland, which were approved by the Colonial Office. On 26 February, the Governor of Southern Rhodesia declared a State of Emergency there, the purpose of which was stated to free up troops and police to be sent to Nyasaland. In total, over 1,000 troops were sent to Nyasaland from Southern Rhodesia and others from Northern Rhodesia, including European troops of the Royal Rhodesia Regiment and African troops of both the Rhodesia African Rifles and the Northern Rhodesian Rifles.

On 3 March 1959 Armitage, as governor of Nyasaland, declared a State of Emergency over the whole of the protectorate and arrested Dr. Hastings Banda, its president and other members of its executive committee, as well as over a hundred local party officials. The Nyasaland African Congress was banned the next day. Those arrested were detained without trial, and the total number detained finally rose to over 1,300. Over 2,000 more were imprisoned for offences related to the Emergency, including rioting and criminal damage. The stated aim of these measures was to allow the Nyasaland government to restore law and order after the increasing lawlessness following Dr Banda's return. Rather than calming the situation immediately, 51 Africans were killed between 20 February 1959 and 19 March 1959, 44 men and 4 women by gunfire, and three men by bayonet or baton. Another 79 people were known to have been wounded by bullets, but the total number of injuries was under-reported, as the less seriously wounded, fearing arrest, did not report their injuries. During the punitive operations undertaken during the Emergency large numbers of people were beaten or 'roughed up'.

In the debate in the House of Commons on 3 March 1959, the day that the State of Emergency was declared, Lennox-Boyd, the Colonial Secretary, stated that it was clear from information received that Congress had planned the widespread murder of Europeans, Asians and moderate Africans, which was the first public mention of a murder plot and, later in the same debate, the Under-Secretary of State at the Colonial Office, Julian Amery, reinforced what Lennox-Boyd had said with talk of a conspiracy of murder and "a massacre ... on a Kenyan scale". During the debate, opposition politicians made allegations in the House of Commons of collusion between the Federal Prime Minister, Welensky and Armitage to arrest Congress supporters in order to preserve the Federation rather than to secure peace and good order in Nyasaland. Although this was denied by the government, Welensky had, in fact, sent advice to Armitage about a possibly declaring an Emergency, and had provided the troops that made declaring it possible.

=== Emergency powers ===
Emergency powers in British colonial territories were based on the 1939 Emergency Powers Order in Council, as amended, or a local equivalent, and the grant of such powers did not require British parliamentary legislation or approval. The Order in Council granted powers to the relevant Governor in Council to proclaim a State of Emergency, and allowed that governor to issue any emergency regulations that appeared to him necessary for securing the public safety, the maintenance of public order and the suppression of rebellion or riots and for maintaining essential supplies and services. Emergency regulations could suspend any law but not set up any court or tribunal to try offenders against the emergency regulations. The emergency regulations issued in Nyasaland in 1959 contained both control provisions and counter-insurgency provisions. The control provisions, which were a normal feature of emergency regulations, allowed for detention without trial, the imposition of collective fines, house searches, restrictions on movement, curfews, compulsory identity cards and censorship, and allowed the security forces to use significant force to disrupt opposition.

Counter-insurgency provisions, which had previously been applied in the Malayan Emergency, Cyprus Emergency and the Mau Mau Uprising, empowered the security forces to engage insurgents by setting-up zones, termed Special Areas in Nyasaland, where lethal force could be used freely and without legal consequences. The security forces were free to shoot to kill anyone entering these areas without permission who failed to stop when challenged and, of the 47 inquests held on people killed by the security forces in Nyasaland, 45 recorded verdicts of justifiable homicide or accidental death. However, the weakness of the safeguard of requiring a challenge is shown by the example quoted in the House of Commons debate of 28 July, describing the fatal shooting of an African woman carrying a baby in the dawn twilight: she was challenged by a Rhodesian soldier in English, which she did not understand, ran and was shot dead.

Detention without trial was monitored by an advisory committee which, although chaired by a judge, was not bound by normal legal rules regarding procedure or evidence and was only able to make recommendations to the governor. Detainees were allowed to consult a lawyer before their hearing, but not to be represented at it, or to cross-examine witnesses. Detainees were only given very general indications of the reasons for their detention, and Special Branch police attended hearings to make recommendations, usually against release.

As early as 5 March 1959, Armitage was in discussion with the Colonial Office about keeping some or all of the Congress leaders in detention after the State of Emergency was ended and the emergency regulations issued under his emergency powers lapsed. This could have led to challenges under the European Convention on Human Rights, but the Colonial Office considered that suitable legislation could be drafted if a "state of public danger" existed in circumstances that fell short of those for a full State of Emergency. Initially, Lennox-Boyd was doubtful about the political consequences of introducing such legislation and, hoping that the Devlin Commission would recommend the continuance od detention without trial, deferred a decision pending its report.

When the State of Emergency ended on 16 June 1960, the emergency regulations issued under the Governor's emergency powers, including internment without trial would have ended unless the additional measures previously discussed were introduced. As the Nyasaland government was concerned that a small number of detainees would resume violent activities and intimidation, legislation was introduced in May 1960 to extend the detention of several named individuals: all these were released by 27 September.

=== Operation Sunrise ===
The arrests were made as part of "Operation Sunrise", so called because the State of Emergency was declared just after midnight on 3 March and arrest squads were sent out at 4.30 am. By 6 am most principal Congress leaders had been arrested and detained, by 9 pm that day 130 had been arrested but even by 5 March a quarter if those listed for arrest had not been detained. Some were released very quickly, but 72 prominent detainees, including Dr Banda, were flown to Southern Rhodesia later on 3 March: others were detained in Nyasaland. In the course of arresting the detainees, no-one being arrested was killed although five were injured, none seriously. However, in the aftermath of these detentions, 21 people were killed on 3 March when protesting against the detentions.

Of these, 20 were killed at Nkhata Bay, where those detained in the Northern Region were being held prior to being transferred by Lake Steamer to the south. A local Congress leader, who had not been arrested, encouraged a large crowd to gather at the dockside at Nkhata Bay, apparently to secure the release of the detainees. A small detachment of troops had arrived on the vessel, but a larger group which should have arrived in the town early on 3 March were inexplicably delayed. As the handful of soldiers holding back the crowd were in danger of being overwhelmed and the promised reinforcements had not arrived, the District Commissioner felt the situation was out of control, and handed over his powers to the military, who then opened fire. Subsequent research has shown that, including those that later died of their wounds, the total death toll at Nkhata Bay was 28. The other death on 3 March was in Blantyre, and there were six more deaths in the Northern Region and five in Machinga District up to 19 March. Most of these deaths occurred when soldiers of the Royal Rhodesia Regiment or Kings African Rifles were ordered to open fire on rioters. The remainder of the 51 officially recorded deaths were in military operations in the Northern Region, termed "Operation Crewcut".

The District Commissioner based in Nkhata Bay in 1959 was John Brock. He subsequently told the Devlin Commission that he had been advised of the "murder plot" and, although Brock thought it was only a wild idea, his actions on 3 March were directed at protecting local European residents in Nkhata Bay. This was the one clear example that rumours of this plot had an effect on events. In fact, the European residents were unmolested throughout the day.

The failure of the Nyasaland operation to round up all intended detainees quickly, and the deaths and initially widespread disturbances that followed that operation, was in contrast to the efficient Southern Rhodesian operation to detain 400 Southern Rhodesia African National Congress members undertaken shortly before the Nyasaland Emergency. The Southern Rhodesian government relied on the strength of the paramilitary British South Africa Police, backed by European conscripts in the Royal Rhodesia Regiment, to quell any disturbances. The Nyasaland operation demonstrated that the protectorate lacked an efficient security service on the Southern Rhodesian model.

=== Operation Crewcut ===
Although the initial reaction of many Congress supporters was rioting, damage to government and European property and strikes, within a few days action by the police and troops ensured that the Southern Region became calm but tense and the strikers returned to work. However, in the more remote areas, particularly of the Northern Region, resistance in the form of the destruction of bridges and government buildings and attacks on agricultural conservation schemes, continued for several months, particularly in the Misuku Hills, a remote area of rural Congress radicalism close to the border with Tanganyika Territory. By October 1958, there were 48 Congress branches in the Northern Region, whose members were the nucleus for a campaign of sabotage that began in that poorly-policed area in mid-February 1959 when constitutional talks broke down and continued until August 1959 when its leader was captured.

This continued resistance was countered by what the governor described as a campaign of harassment, a series of punitive operations undertaken by soldiers rather than police in what were considered "disaffected" areas, mostly in the north of the protectorate. The operation against armed resistance in the Karonga District was known as "Operation Crewcut", and the aim of the campaign here and elsewhere was to restore government authority. Suspected members of Congress were arrested and temporarily detained, subject to the governor later ordering long-term detention, or together with other Africans, were charged with criminal offences, either under the emergency regulations or normal laws: a total of 1,040 persons were convicted by the courts and 840 acquitted up to the end of October 1959, when this campaign in the north ceased. In addition, collective fines were imposed on some of these areas under the emergency regulations and, during the operations, homes and property were destroyed and large numbers of Africans were physically abused. The allegations of brutality and wanton destruction made against the security forces were later considered by the Devlin Commission. It rejected claims of rape and torture made against Federation troops during Operation Crewcut, but it upheld complaints of the frequent burning of houses, the imposition of arbitrary fines and bullying behaviour, including beatings with rifle butts or fists, all of which it considered to be illegal and excessive.

== The Devlin Commission ==
Within two days of the declaration of the State of Emergency, the British cabinet under Harold Macmillan decided to set up a Commission of Inquiry into the disturbances. Despite strong parliamentary pressure for its members to be involved, the cabinet decided on a "limited factual enquiry" into the recent disturbances in Nyasaland and the events leading up to them would be carried out by a Commission of Inquiry composed of a judge and three other members. In addition, a wider Royal Commission on the future of the Federation of Rhodesia and Nyasaland was to be held in 1960, which was the Monckton Commission.

The four Commissioners were believed to belong to the British Establishment and of a conservative disposition. However, its chairman, Patrick Devlin, was independently-minded and opposed to what he saw as oppression and injustice. His three colleagues had a variety of relevant experience: one was described as the personification of decency and fair play and the two other Commissioners were both experienced and independently-minded. Macmillan did not choose Devlin as chairman, and later criticised his appointment on the basis of his Irish ancestry and Catholic upbringing, and also of supposed professional disappointment. Macmillan and his cabinet colleagues not only broadly rejected the detailed Devlin Report, but engineered the production of the rival Armitage Report, which was prepared very quickly and released on the same day as the Devlin Report.

The Commissioners arrived in Nyasaland on 11 April 1959 and went about their work in a way that concerned the Nyasaland government. It was apparent that they intended a thorough investigation into the declaration of the State of Emergency and the murder plot, and were unlikely to vindicate the actions of the Nyasaland government, the police and troops. The British and Nyasaland governments were concerned that Devlin would question the roles of the Federal and Southern Rhodesian governments in influencing Armitage's decision to declare a State of Emergency, but they were generally successful in steering the Commission away from evidence of any plan to eliminate Banda and the NAC in order to preserve the Federation.

The Commission's Report was largely drafted by Devlin who, while in summarising the facts, added inferences to be drawn from them, directing the Secretary of State towards particular conclusions. It concentrated on three areas: the State of Emergency, the murder plot and African opposition to Federation. It found that the declaration of an Emergency was necessary to restore order, but criticised instances of the illegal use of force by the police and troops, although rejecting claims of rape and torture by them. Its strongest criticism was over the "murder plot", which it concluded did not exist as a formed plot, except in the imagination of Special Branch, and condemned using it to justify the Emergency. Finally, it noted an almost universal rejection of Federation in Nyasaland and suggested the British government should negotiate on the country's constitutional future.

The Commission also found that the Nyasaland government's suppression of criticism and of support for Congress justified calling it "a police state". No colonial government had been so heavily criticised by an official enquiry before this. The Colonial Office obtained a draft of the Commission's report and used it to prepare an attack in parliament. The government claimed that it had the right to accept what was favourable in the Report, such as that the State of Emergency was necessary, and reject the rest. The Attorney-General Sir Reginald Manningham-Buller attacked the Repart's use of the expression "police state" and its rejection of talk about a coherent murder plot: he also claimed that any illegal force used was a regrettable operational necessity

The Commissioners felt let down by this reaction, but one anticipated that the Report would soon be vindicated, as it was within a year after Iain Macleod replaced Lennox-Boyd in October 1959. Although their Report was initially discredited, in the longer term it helped to convince the British Government that the Federation was not acceptable to the African majority in Nyasaland. The Devlin Report is the only example of a British judge examining whether the actions of a colonial administration in suppressing dissent were appropriate. It was not only a significant incident in British decolonization, but an expression of the values of judicial independence and commitment to the rule of law even in emergency conditions, when they are most under threat.

== Ending the Emergency ==
Armitage had no plans to resolve the political crisis in Nyasaland, other than the elimination of Banda and Congress and, from March 1959, he repeatedly sought Colonial Office approval either to ban Banda from returning to Nyasaland after his detention or to extend his detention (in Rhodesia or Nyasaland) indefinitely, and he was also unwilling to release most of the detainees. The Malawi Congress Party was formed as the successor to the banned Nyasaland African Congress by Orton Chirwa after his release from detention in August 1959 as interim President, although he acknowledged Banda as the party's true leader, a position that Banda assumed on his own release and return to Nyasaland. Those other African politicians that had put themselves forward as moderate alternatives to Banda were, Armitage himself admitted, not credible and without influence. Armitage's hopes of negotiating with Orton Chirwa instead of Banda were dashed when Chirwa said that only Banda had the authority to do so.

Armitage was resistant to releasing detainees to reduce their numbers, and his insistence on a detailed review of each case and his statement in July 1959 that he could not envisage releasing a hard core of 49 detainees caused tension with Macleod. In January 1960, Armitage also asked for extra troops from Southern Rhodesia when Banda was due to be released, a request that Macleod declined to authorise. Although Armitage and the Federal and Southern Rhodesian governments were apparently willing to use significant levels of force to keep Nyasaland in the Federation, by the start of 1960, the British government was no longer prepared to do so.

The Royal Commission on the future of the Federation of Rhodesia and Nyasaland (the Monckton Commission) toured the Federation in February 1960. It had been given limited terms of reference and was boycotted by the opposition Labour Party and the African nationalists in Nyasaland and Northern Rhodesia. As the Commission's composition seemed weighted towards a continuation of the Federation, its report disappointed the British government. The Monckton Commission reported widespread and sincere opposition to the Federation in the two northern territories. It considered Federation could not survive without at least a major devolution of powers to Nyasaland and Northern Rhodesia, giving more voting rights to Africans and lessening racial discrimination. Most importantly, it also recommended that Britain should retain the right to allow the secession of either northern territory, recognising that African nationalists would not accept even a modified Federation.

The British government broadly accepted the Monckton report, signalling a withdrawal of support for the Federation and the acceptance of early majority rule for Nyasaland and Northern Rhodesia. Accordingly, and despite opposition from Armitage, from the governments of the Federation and Southern Rhodesia, and from some colleagues in the cabinet, Macleod released Banda from detention on 1 April 1960 and immediately began to negotiate with him on Nyasaland's constitutional future. The State of Emergency was lifted on 16 June 1960. Following an overwhelming Malawi Congress Party victory in August 1961 elections, preparations were made for independence, which was achieved on 6 July 1964.

Even before Macleod's appointment, Lord Perth and Colonial Office officials expressed doubts in October 1959 about Armitage's belief that sufficient moderates could be found to supplant Congress or in his ability to negotiate with Banda, assuming the latter were released. Armitage was informed by Macmillan on 4 January 1960 of the proposal to release Banda in February (this was later deferred to 1 April) in an acrimonious meeting in which he accused Macmillan of being prepared to risk lives in Nyasaland for reasons of political expediency in Britain. This was during Macmillan's visit to Blantyre, part of the Prime Minister's six-nation African tour, during which demonstrations were held in Blantyre against the continuation of the Emergency, and a number of British journalists present made allegations of police brutality against what they described as a boisterous but largely peaceful demonstrators. Several British newspapers called for an impartial inquiry into the police handling of the demonstration, which Armitage opposed. However, Macleod bowed to press and parliamentary pressure and, on 2 February, agreed to a judge-led inquiry, instructing Armitage to arrange it. The ensuing Southworth Commission cleared the Nyasaland police of brutality and criticised British correspondents for distorting events. However, the press coverage highlighted to the British public and parliament the strength of African opposition to the Federation of Rhodesia and Nyasaland and the degree of coercion needed to preserve it, and further discredited Armitage.

Macmillan and Macleod decided not to dismiss Armitage immediately, but in April 1960 they designated Glyn Smallwood Jones as his successor to take over in due course. Following Banda's release and the ending of the State of Emergency on 16 June 1960, Armitage, who did not trust Banda, was seen by Macleod as discredited and as an obstacle to constitutional progress. In August 1960, Macleod advised Armitage to go on leave pending his retirement, and he retired in April 1961 without returning to Nyasaland.

== Recent research on the Emergency ==
The Colonial Office was largely successful in concealing from the Devlin Commission evidence that it, Armitage and Welensky wished to eliminate Banda and the NAC to preserve the Federation. Later research has established the degree of interference by the Federal and Southern Rhodesian governments in the declaration of the Nyasaland Emergency. Although it was claimed at the time that the Southern Rhodesian Premier, Whitehead, had proclaimed a State of Emergency there to free up troops to send to Nyasaland in response to the concerns Armitage had expressed in mid-February, it is now clear that Whitehead had been planning to suppress the Southern Rhodesia African National Congress (SRANC) since December 1958, despite little or no evidence that it was acting unlawfully, and that he had Welensky's approval for this action.

Armitage was only made aware of the planned action against the SRANC at a meeting of Prime Ministers and governors in Salisbury on 20 February, at which the governor of Northern Rhodesia, Sir Arthur Benson was also put under pressure to act against African anti-Federal parties and declare a State of Emergency in Northern Rhodesia. Benson resisted this pressure, but did place restrictions on 47 Zambian African National Congress activists. Whitehead also wished to take control of security in southern Nyasaland as the price for loaning 900 Southern Rhodesian police to Nyasaland following Armitage's request for police reinforcements: it was an offer Armitage felt obliged to decline.

Baker, who had served for eight years in the colonial civil service in Nyasaland, made a number of criticisms of the Devlin Commission and Report. Baker's account of the 1959 State of Emergency was criticised by Macmillan as based largely on official documents in government archives and on the papers of, and interviews with, former British and colonial officials, but involved no similar interviews with former Congress members, such that it amounts to a partisan defence Sir Robert Armitage and his officials. Armitage, in Macmillan's opinion, failed in Cyprus and failed again in Nyasaland through a lack of political judgement, including a failure to understand nationalism in either dependency. McCracken also considers Armitage had failed to control a political crisis in Cyprus, so was determined not to fail again in Nyasaland, and that, by October 1959, the contempt he expressed for African political aspirations, even in official correspondence, amounted to racial paranoia. McCracken also suggests that Baker's underlying aim was to "set the record straight" by restoring the reputation of Nyasaland's colonial officials of the 1950s and 1960s, while attacking African nationalists and their sympathisers. Like Macmillan, he notes Baker's reliance on official sources, including Special Branch reports, and the recollections of expatriates, and the reduction of African leaders to stereotypes.

== Sources ==
- C. Baker, (1993). Seeds of Trouble: Government Policy and Land Rights in Nyasaland, 1946–1964, London, British Academic Press.
- C. Baker, (1997). State of Emergency: Nyasaland 1959, I.B.Tauris. ISBN 1-86064-068-0.
- C. Baker, (1998). Retreat from Empire: Sir Robert Armitage in Africa and Cyprus, I. B. Tauris. ISBN 978-1-86064-223-4.
- C. Baker, (2007). The Mechanics of Rebuttal: The British and Nyasaland Governments' Response to The Devlin Report, 1959, The Society of Malawi Journal, Vol. 60, No. 2.
- J. Brock, (2014). District Commissioner John Brock's Personal Account of the Events at Nkhata Bay on 3 March 1959, The Society of Malawi Journal, Vol. 67, No. 2.
- R. Coffey (2015). Does the Daily Paper rule Britannia: The British Press, British Public Opinion, and the End of Empire in Africa, 1957–60.
- J. Darwin, (1994). The Central African Emergency, 1959, in R Holland (editor), Emergencies and Disorder in the European Empires After 1945, Abingdon, Routledge. ISBN 0-71464-109-X.
- D. French, (2011). The British Way in Counter-insurgency, 1945 -1967. Oxford University Press. ISBN 978-0-19958-796-4.
- D. French, (2016). Nasty, not nice: British counter-insurgency doctrine and practice, 1945 -1967, in M Hughes (editor), British Ways of Counter-insurgency: A Historical Perspective. London, Routledge. ISBN 978-1-13492-045-7.
- Hansard, House of Commons, (1959). Nyasaland (Report of Commission of Inquiry) Debate 28 July 1959 Vol. 610 Columns 317-449.
- A. Horne, (2008). Macmillan: The Official Biography, Pan Macmillan. ISBN 0-230-73881-8.
- J. McCracken, (1998). Democracy and Nationalism in Historical Perspective: The Case of Malawi, African Affairs, Vol. 97, No. 387.
- J. McCracken, (2002). The Ambiguities of Nationalism: Flax Musopole and the Northern Factor in Malawian Politics, c. 1956–1966, Journal of Southern African Studies, Vol. 28, No. 1, Special Issue: Malawi.
- J McCracken, (2003). 'Setting the Record Straight'? Transition in Colonial Malawi, Journal of Southern African Studies, Vol. 29, No. 3.
- J. McCracken, (2012). A History of Malawi, 1859–1966, Woodbridge, James Currey. ISBN 978-1-84701-050-6.
- H. Macmillan, (1998). Review of “State of Emergency: Crisis in Central Africa”, Journal of Southern African Studies, Vol. 24, No. 3.
- P. Murphy, (2010). A Police State? The Nyasaland Emergency and Colonial Intelligence, Journal of Southern African Studies, Vol. 36, No. 4.
- P. Murray (editor), (2005). British documents on the end of Empire, Central Africa, Part 2. University of London: Institute of Commonwealth Studies. ISBN 978-0-11290-587-5.
- B Pachai (1973). Land Policies in Malawi: An Examination of the Colonial Legacy, The Journal of African History, Vol. 14, No. 4.
- B. Pachai, (1978). Land and Politics in Malawi 1875–1975, Kingston (Ontario), The Limestone Press.
- R. Palmer, (1986). Working Conditions and Worker Responses on the Nyasaland Tea Estates, 1930–1953, Journal of African History, Vol. 27, No. 1.
- C. Parkinson, (2007). Bills of Rights and Decolonization: The Emergence of Domestic Human Rights Instruments in Britain's Overseas Territories, Oxford University Press. ISBN 0-19-923193-1.
- D. Percox, (2004).Britain, Kenya and the Cold War: Imperial Defence, Colonial Security and Decolonisation, London, I.B.Tauris. ISBN 978-1-85043-460-3.
- J. G. Pike, (1969). Malawi: A Political and Economic History, London, Pall Mall Press.
- J. Power, (2010). Political culture and nationalism in Malawi: building Kwacha. University Rochester Press. ISBN 1-58046-310-X.
- T. Ranger, (2009). The 1959 Emergency Conference, Zomba, 2009 - a personal perspective, The Society of Malawi Journal, Vol. 62, No. 2.
- A. C. Ross, (2009). Colonialism to cabinet crisis: a political history of Malawi, African Books Collective. ISBN 978-99908-87-75-4.
- R. I. Rotberg, (1965). The Rise of Nationalism in Central Africa: The Making of Malawi and Zambia, 1873–1964, Cambridge (Mass), Harvard University Press.
- C. Sanger, (1960). Central African Emergency, London, Heinemann.
- A. W. B. Simpson, (2004). Human Rights and the End of Empire: Britain and the Genesis of the European Convention. Oxford University Press. ISBN 978-0-19926 789-7.
- B. Simpson, (2002). The Devlin Commission (1959): Colonialism, Emergencies, and the Rule of Law, Oxford Journal of Legal Studies, Vol. 22, No. 1.
- S. Tenney and N. K. Humphreys, (2011). Historical Dictionary of the International Monetary Fund, Toronto, Scarecrow Press. ISBN 978-0-8108-7531-9.
