= Certificates of Claim =

Legal instrument in the British Central Africa Protectorate

Certificates of Claim were a form of legal instrument by which the colonial administration of the British Central Africa Protectorate granted legal property titles to individuals, companies and others who claimed to have acquired land within the protectorate by grant or purchase. The proclamation of the British Central Africa Protectorate was endorsed by the British Foreign Office in May 1891, and Harry Johnston as Commissioner and Consul-General examined and adjudicated on all claims to the ownership of land said to have been acquired before or immediately after that date. Between late 1892 and March 1894, Johnston issued 59 Certificates of Claim for land, each of which was equivalent to a freehold title to the land claimed. Very few claims were disallowed or reduced in extent, and around 3.7 million acres, or 15% of the land area of the protectorate, was alienated, mainly to European settlers. No Certificates of Claim were issued after 1894, but this form of land title was never abolished, and some land in Malawi is still held under those certificates.

== Background to the land issue ==
In pre-colonial times, the right of land ownership in much of Malawi belonged under the rules of customary law to the African communities that occupied it. Community leaders could allocate the use of communal land to its members, but usually declined to grant it to outsiders, follow established custom. Neither the leaders nor the current members of a community could alienate its land, which they held in trust for future generations. Customary law had little legal status in the early colonial period, as in 1902 the Parliament of the United Kingdom enacted the British Central Africa Order, which provided that English Law would generally apply in the British Central Africa Protectorate and that the Crown had sovereignty over all the land in the protectorate, which others held as its tenants.

In the period after 1860, southern Malawi suffered insecurity through warfare and slave raiding: this led to the widespread abandonment fertile land. Local chiefs tried to gain protection from European companies, settlers or missionaries who entered the area from the 1860s by granting them the right to cultivate vacant, insecure land. The African Lakes Company was formed in 1877 to cooperate with the missions established in central Africa by combating the slave trade, introducing legitimate trade and developing European influence there. Despite its benevolent aims, its local agents claimed to have made treaties or agreements with several chiefs, although there was little documentation for its large claims. Some of these treaties claimed to a transfer of sovereignty to the company, which may have had the ambition to become a Chartered company. Three others individuals claimed to have purchased large areas of land. Eugene Sharrer claimed to have acquired 363,034 acres, and he had attempted to induce chiefs to give up their sovereign rights: he may also have intended to form his own Chartered company. Alexander Low Bruce, the son-in-law of David Livingstone and a director of the African Lakes Company, claimed 176,000 acres, and John Buchanan and his brothers claimed a further 167,823 acres. These lands were purchased for trivial quantities of goods under agreements signed by chiefs with no understanding of English concepts of land tenure.

== Johnston's review of land claims ==
The British government appointed Harry Johnston, later Sir Harry, as Commissioner and Consul-General of the protectorate from 1891. Johnston rejected the suggestion that it could have any treatsἑ made before the protectorate was established could transfer sovereignty to individuals or companies. However, he did accept that these treaties and other agreements might be evidence of sales of land. Before the British Central Africa Protectorate was proclaimed in June 1891, Johnston had only made treaties of friendship with local chiefs, which did not surrender sovereignty to the Crown, and he did not consider that the Crown had a general claim to sovereign ownership of any land unless this had been expressly transferred by cession. Without sovereignty, the Crown had no right to alienate that land. The treaties that he made from July 1891 did cede sovereignty over land, but granted the chiefs and people involved the right to retain the land that they actually occupied, leaving all the unoccupied land free for the Crown to dispose of. Although the protectorate had been proclaimed on the understanding that British South Africa Company would contribute to the costs of its administration, Johnson, refused to act as the company's agent and resisted its demand that the Crown lands forming about 20% of the protectorate should be transferred to company control and that Johnson should also facilitate the transfer of African lands, about 40% of total land, to it

Although Johnston accepted that the land belonged to its African communities, so their chiefs had no right to alienate it to anyone, he put forward the legal fiction that each chief's people had tacitly accepted he could assume such a right. Although under this interpretation chiefs could cede land to the Crown or sell or grant land not currently being used by the community to Europeans, Johnston claimed that, as Commissioner, he was entitled to investigate whether these sales were valid and, if they were, to issue a Certificate of Claim (in effect a registration of freehold title) in the land to the new owners. Johnston had no legal training and the protectorate has no law officers until 1896. However, when the legality of the Certificates of Claim system was challenged in 1903 on the basis that the agreements made by the chiefs breached the rights of their community members, the Appeals Court upheld the validity of the certificates, ruling that that title arose from a grant by the Crown's representative, not from any agreements made by the chiefs. The court did however judge that many aspects of the agreements were unfair and one-sided.

Johnston recorded that his review of land claims begun in late 1892 was necessary because the proclamation of the protectorate had been followed by a wholesale land grab, with huge areas of land being bought for trivial sums and many claims overlapping or requiring adjustment. He regarded long occupation and improvement of the land as the best way to justify a claim, but it was rare. Failing this, he or an assistant sought confirmation that the chiefs named in agreements had agreed to sell the land and had received a fair return for the sale. However, his estimates of land value were very low, from a halfpenny an acre for indifferent land up to a maximum of threepence an acre for fertile land in the most favoured districts. The existing African villages and farms were exempted from these sales, and the villagers were told that their homes and fields were not being alienated. Initially, the exact boundaries in many of Johnston's land grants were unclear, but in 1895 government surveyors were appointed and to record these boundaries on official plans

=== Non-disturbance clauses ===
In addition, most Certificates of Claim included a non-disturbance clause providing that existing African villages and planted areas were not to be disturbed without consent from the protectorate government. The non-disturbance clauses were largely ineffective, firstly because the landowners routinely ignored them with impunity, secondly because the land occupied by Africans at the date of the certificate was not recorded and thirdly, the practice of shifting cultivation meant that much of what Johnston thought was unoccupied or waste land near villages was land that was temporarily out of use and resting under local variants of the Chitemene system that is still employed in parts of Zambia.

In the early years of the protectorate, the owners usually did not object to Africans resident on their estates practising shifting cultivation and moving their fields every few years, as they wanted to retain existing residents and attract new ones as a workforce. However, any new residents, many of which were migrants from Mozambique, were obliged to provide unpaid labour in lieu of rent for the land they occupied, under the system of thangata. Although original residents were, at least in theory, exempt from this form of labour rent, once cotton started to be grown commercially after 1901, followed by widespread planting of tobacco from 1905, this exemption came under attack. Both crops needed a great deal of labour during their growing seasons, and owners attempted to reduce all residents to the status of insecure labour tenants, who could be evicted at will. This was resisted, and some original residents or their descendants moved to land outside the estates rather than remain as labour tenants. The situation was not finally resolved until the colonial administration's Natives on Private Estates Ordinance 1928 removed the distinction between descendants of original residents and others by abolishing non-disturbance clauses.

== Certificates of Claim granted ==
Johnston received and reviewed 66 claims related to land and seven for mineral rights. Of the land claims, five related to land in German East Africa or North-Eastern Rhodesia so Johnston only had jurisdiction over 61 claims. Only two of these claims were rejected outright, with a handful reduced in size, and Johnston issued 59 Certificates of Claim for land in British Central Africa. Only one certificate was issued to an African in his own right; this was for 37,947 acres granted to Kuntaja. Kuntaja had bought this land from various chiefs between 1888 and 1891 and he did so acting not as a community leader or representative but as an entrepreneur in his own right. His claim to the Chilingani Estate, Blantyre, was granted in 1893 and the land was disposed of at a profit in the same year to three European buyers, including 26,537 acres sold to Joseph Booth of the Zambezi Industrial Mission. The largest certificate granted related to land in what is now the Northern Region of Malawi but almost all the others were for land in the Southern Region, particularly the Shire Highlands, a largely fertile area with reasonable transport links to the east coast.

The largest grant under a Certificate of Claim was of over 2.7 million acres, amounting to almost all of what was then the North Nyasa District (covering all of today's Karonga, Chitipa and Rumphi districts). The African Lakes Corporation made, or claimed to have made, treaties between 1884 and 1886 with local chiefs in the area northwest of Lake Nyasa near Karonga, where it had a trading station. However, a report in 1929 questioned the validity of the claims, and investigation showed that many of the supposed treaties were spurious and lacked credible documentation. Some supposed treaties had never been made at all, others with people who were in no sense chiefs or agents authorised by legitimate chiefs, and some others did not relate to the areas claimed or were obtained by deception. The African Lakes Company had made almost no effort to develop its land and had not imposed any obligations on the local Africans to work for it or to pay rent. The company had, however, sold off some of the land it claimed to plantations which did impose these obligations, and local people were concerned that there would be further sales. By the time of this report, the African Lakes Company had been taken over by the British South Africa Company, which agreed in 1930 to the cancellation of the Certificate of Claim in exchange for the grant of mineral rights over the same area. The African Lakes Company also received seven other certificates covering almost 45,000 acres. Three were for small bases at ports by the Shire or Lake Nyasa, the others were for moderately-sized estates in the Shire Highlands. However, African Lakes failed to substantiate two other claims. The first was a large claim in the South Nyasa District, now Mangochi District comprising all the land south of Lake Nyasa and west of the Shire, which was said to have been purchased for £5. The other was in Mlanje District, where the company tried to occupy land without any semblance of buying it. The company was also awarded mineral rights in five areas.

Each of the three next-largest claims had been purchased by individuals but later transferred to companies. Eugene Sharrer acquired 363,034 acres in three large and two smaller estates; about half his land was in the Shire valley, where he grew cotton from 1901. He had earlier experimented with coffee, and by 1891 he planted the greatest area of coffee in the protectorate, and he also farmed tobacco. In 1902, Sharrer formed The British Central Africa Company Ltd to consolidate his business and land interests, and became a director and the principal shareholder of that company. John Buchanan in partnership with his brothers claimed 167,823 acres in three large and four smaller estates, all in the Shire Highlands. Buchanan was originally a gardener and was the first planter to grow coffee and Virginia tobacco commercially in British Central Africa. He died in 1896 and the estates of the Buchanan Brothers partnership were taken over by a group of largely Scottish landowners who became the shareholders of Blantyre and East Africa Ltd, a company formed in 1901. Alexander Low Bruce received 176,000 acres, almost all of which were in the large Magomero estate. On his death on 1893, this land passed to the A L Bruce Trust, whose main beneficiaries were his two sons. In 1913, these sons purchased the assets of the A L Bruce Trust and incorporated A L Bruce Estates Ltd. The four companies (including African Lakes) together held 22 of the 59 Certificates of Claim issued relating to land: these comprised around 95% of all the land alienated by these certificates. Of the remaining Certificates of Claim, 18 were granted to missions, generally for small areas of land although the largest was for the islands of Likoma District. The remaining 19 Certificates of Claim were for a number of estates: 17 were in the medium size range (2,000 to 12,000 acres). The two larger estates were both soon broken up by sales into a number of medium-sized estates.

== Later history of Certificates of Claim ==
No Certificates of Claim were issued after March 1894, when it was calculated that 3,705,255 acres has been alienated, although later, more accurate, surveys reduced the total to 3,691,767 acres. When further areas of Crown land were alienated, or where parts of any estate that had been comprised in a Certificate of Claim was sold, the owner was granted a freehold title. When land comprised in such a certificate came into the ownership of the protectorate through purchase or forfeiture, it became Crown land. Most unalienated Crown land became Native Trust Land in 1936 by virtue of the Nyasaland Protectorate (Native Trust Lands) Order, 1936.

The amount of land held under Certificates of Claim was still in excess of 600,000 acres in 1948, when a Land Planning Commission reviewed landownership, but the future of many estates was in doubt by then, and at independence in 1964 only 422,000 acres of European-owned estates remained, mainly tea estates, not all held under Certificates of Claim. From 1962, landless peasants began to occupy significant amounts of unused land on the remaining estates, principally areas of land in the tea estates in Mulanje and Thyolo districts that had not been planted with tea bushes. These encroachments were organised by officials of the Malawi Congress Party and, although not sanctioned by the party's national leaders, were not challenged until after independence in 1965, after Cabinet Crisis of 1964 in Malawi led to the resignation or sacking of ministers favourable to such direct action. President Hastings Banda introduced the Land Act of 1965, which gave greater legal security to landowners holding land under Certificates of Claim and ensured that the police evicted squatters. Section 2 of the Land Act of 1965 defines private land in Malawi as, “All land which is owned, held or occupied under a freehold title, or a leasehold title, or a Certificate of Claim or which is registered as private land under the Registered Land Act”. This legislation made no attempt to question the legal validity of Certificates of Claim, and as several estates are still owned by descendants of, or companies formed by, their original owners, Certificate of Claim still form the basis for their ownership today.

=== Economic effects ===
John Buchanan, and possibly others among the major landowners, intended to sell off parts of their holdings to later settlers as medium-sized estates. However, although Johnston registered most of the land acquisitions made before 1891 and soon after, his policies had the effect of freezing the situation as it existed in the early 1890s. Firstly, he discouraged further large alienations by making unalienated land Crown Land available to its African communities. This prevented the growth of an indigenous landless proletariat forced to work on European-owned estates, as in much of South Africa or Southern Rhodesia, although it did permit the migration of Mozambican migrants, who formed much of the early estate workforces. Secondly, Johnston discouraged resale of estate land by fixing high prices of five shillings an acre in settled areas and two shillings and sixpence an acre elsewhere. This left the large estates unable to raise capital by selling surplus land. The undercapitalised estates could only farm a fraction of their land, and as a result the economy of Nyasaland stagnated.

== See also ==
- Nyasaland
- Thangata
