= British Central Africa Company =

Former company in Nyasaland

The British Central Africa Company Ltd was one of the four largest European-owned companies that operated in colonial Nyasaland (current Malawi). The company was incorporated in 1902 to acquire the business interests that Eugene Sharrer, an early settler and entrepreneur, had developed in the British Central Africa Protectorate. Sharrer became the majority shareholder of the company on its foundation. The company initially had trading and transport interests, but these were sold by the 1930s. For most of the colonial period, its extensive estates produced cotton, tobacco or tea but the British Central Africa Company Ltd developed the reputation of being a harsh and exploitative landlord whose relations with its tenants were poor. In 1962, shortly before independence, the company sold most of its undeveloped land to the Nyasaland government, but it retained some plantations and two tea factories. It changed its name to The Central Africa Company Ltd and was acquired by the Lonrho group, both in 1964.

== Corporate history ==
The British Central Africa Company Ltd was said to be "of London", implying that it was once registered in England, but no current English registration can now be traced, although the company had a London office based at Thames House London EC2. The company's name was changed to The Central Africa Company Ltd and it became a subsidiary of Lonrho (Malawi) Ltd in 1964. The original Malawi headquarters of the company were at the Kabula Stores Ltd offices and warehouses on Kabula Hill, part of one of Eugene Sharrer's estates. The company moved from Kabula to Limbe around the time of the opening of the Shire Highlands Railway to Limbe. The company's base is still in Limbe and the company is still in existence. Lonrho sold the Central Africa Company Ltd to African Plantations Corporation in June 1997.

== Predecessor ==
Eugene Sharrer, who was described as an archetypal colonial outsider, arrived in Central Africa in 1888 and soon began working in the ivory trade. His trading venture developed into the wholesale and retail business of Kubula Stores Ltd, and he diversified by acquiring large landholdings and building up a successful farming business. Sharrer also built up and operated one of the fleets of steamers on the Zambezi and Shire rivers through the Sharrer's Zambezi Traffic Company Ltd. These rivers formed the main route into British Central Africa, and to improve transport links, he promoted the development of the first railway in the country, whose construction was agreed in 1902. Shortly after this, he left Africa permanently for London, although he retained his financial interests there.

== Trading ==
The British Central Africa Company Ltd took over Sharrer's Kubula Stores Ltd in 1902. This was one of several European-owned firms engaged in general wholesale and retail trading. The largest of these was Mandala, owned by the African Lakes Corporation which, in addition to its main urban stores, had opened a chain of around 50 rural retail stores. After the First World War, Kubula Stores was the main rival to Mandala but it largely failed to penetrate the rural areas. The Kubula Stores business was sold to the African Lakes Corporation in the 1920s and the Kubula Stores Ltd company was struck-off the Register of Companies in 1943.

== Transport ==
=== River transport ===
The business of Sharrer's Zambezi Traffic Company Ltd was transferred to the British Central Africa Company Ltd in 1902. The company ran riverboat services from the British concession of Chinde at the mouth of the Zambezi to Chiromo on the Shire River until the opening of the Shire Highlands Railway to Port Herald downriver of Chiromo in 1908. Port Herald then became the new terminus for river services. The Central Africa Railway Ltd was opened from Port Herald to Chindio on the north bank of the Zambezi in 1914, after which the British Central Africa Company ran its service from Chinde to Port Herald in the wet season, but only to Chindio when water levels were low. When the Trans-Zambezia Railway Ltd completed its line from the south bank of the Zambezi to Beira in 1922, that company took over the British Central Africa Company's remaining river fleet for use as cross-river ferries.

=== Railways ===
The British Central Africa Company Ltd was a major shareholder in the Shire Highlands Railway Company and the Central Africa Railway Ltd. In 1930, Nyasaland Railways Ltd was formed to acquire the business of the Shire Highlands Railway Ltd and the share capital of the Central Africa Railway Ltd. This left the British Central Africa Company as a significant shareholder in Nyasaland Railways Ltd. The company, whose name was now The Central Africa Company, became a subsidiary of Lonrho (Malawi) Ltd in 1964 Lonrho bought The Central Africa Company Ltd mainly because of its railway shares, but also acquired a 3,500 acre tea plantation, two tea factories and some other small estates.

== Landholdings ==
The British Central Africa Company Ltd was the second-largest of four estate-owning companies in colonial Nyasaland which together owned over 3.4 million acres of land, including the majority of the fertile land in the Shire Highlands. Eugene Sharrer had been the owner of three large and two smaller estates, all largely undeveloped when he transferred them to the company. These included land in the Shire Highlands, but also in the Shire valley. The British Central Africa Company Ltd acquired 372,500 acres from Sharrer in 1902. Its two most productive estates were in the Shire valley: Kupimbi of around 68,000 acres in the Middle Shire, which grew tobacco, and Chelumbo of about 132,000 acres in the Upper Shire, which grew cotton. A third Shire valley estate of about 17,000 acres near Chikwawa also grew cotton. The company also owned two estates in the Shire Highlands. Its estate at Cholo was originally its largest one, of over 150,000 acres, but by 1920 around 20,000 acres had been sold or leased. Around 6,000 acres of the 28,000 acre Kubula estate, northwest of the centre of Blantyre had also been sold or leased, but it was overpopulated, with 5,713 registered tenants on 1929 and 4,500 in 1939, most of whom were heads of families. By 1924, the company had sold or leased almost 77,000 acres of its original 372,500 acres. Of the 295,500 acres the British Central Africa Company Ltd held directly in that year, it actively farmed only 6,000 acres itself, the remainder was cultivated by tenants or fallow. Until the mid-1930s, the British Central Africa Company Ltd was relatively relaxed about collecting rents from its tenants, but as the Natives on Private Estates Ordinance 1928 allowed estate owners to evict 10% of their tenants without cause in 1933 and every five years thereafter, it began to evict significant numbers its of tenants. The company Ltd exercised its right to expel the full 10% from its Cholo estates in 1933, the only estate owner in the protectorate to do so. By 1947, some of the earlier leases had ended, and the company directly held 329,000 acres and it actively farmed 29,000 of them.

In 1948 the government set up a Land Planning Committee, whose first report recommended that government should re-acquire land which was either undeveloped or occupied by large numbers of Africans. This included the projected re-purchase of about two-thirds of the British Central Africa Company's freehold land. The company had long fought to retain its landholdings, much of which was undeveloped, claiming that soil exhaustion and erosion, deforestation and poor husbandry would result if the land were resettled by smallholders. In 1948, the company was still unwilling to sell its better land to the government. However, it was prepared to sell inferior land, and in 1948 the government bought freehold land from the British Central Africa Company in the Chingale area in the western part of Zomba District to convert it to land held by customary tenure and resettle Africans evacuated from other estates in the Shire valley and highlands on it. The Chingale resettlement scheme took place from 1948 to 1954. Following a serious famine in 1949, Geoffrey Colby, the Governor of Nyasaland from 1948 to 1956, attempted to get the major estate companies to sell the under-used parts of their land to the government for resettlement. However, Colby made it clear he would not use the compulsory purchase powers he had been granted, preferring voluntary agreement. By ruling compulsion out, he gave unintended encouragement to the British Central Africa Company's plans to retain its estates. In 1955, the Nyasaland government agreed to purchase almost 36,470 acres in Cholo District with 24,600 residents from the British Central Africa Company for resettlement. Before this, the company had owned 74,262 acres with 36,400 residents. The company retained 38,143 acres, but of the 11,800 residents, 3,240 were moved onto Crown lands. However, it was only in 1962, when independence was clearly in prospect, that the company accepted the need to sell its surplus land, retaining only its most profitable assets. At the time of its takeover by Lonrho (Malawi) Ltd in 1964, the Central Africa Company Ltd owned a 3,500 acre tea plantation, two tea factories and some other small estates. The Central Africa Company Ltd, with its remaining agricultural assets, was sold by Lonrho to African Plantations Corporation June 1997.

== Agricultural activities ==
The basis of estate agriculture in Nyasaland for much of the colonial period was the system of thangata which, in the early colonial period, meant that African on estates had to perform agricultural labour in lieu of the rent for a plot of land on which they could grow food. At first, estates usually required two months’ labour a year from adult men, one month for their rent, the second in reimbursement of the Hut tax paid by the landowner on behalf of tenants. Widows and other single women who were tenants were usually exempted from the rental obligation and did not pay hut tax. However, on some estates the obligations of labour tenants were extended, and abuses such as requiring 30 days work (five weeks of six days), rather than allowing Sundays as rest days, for each month of thangata or requiring that women heading households should work to satisfy rent due were introduced. The demand for estate labour declined in the 1920s, and British Central Africa Company was the first estate owner to modify thangata. The company issued seed to African tenants so that they could grow cotton or tobacco under supervision, and then sell their crops to the company at low prices. The Natives on Private Estates Ordinance 1928 formalised this arrangement by allowing landlords to receive rents in cash, in a fixed quantity of acceptable crops or by direct labour. The types of permissible crops and their quantities were fixed for each district by government officials. At this time, the term thangata applied both to rent in kind, common on tobacco and cotton estates, and to the older form of labour thangata, which persisted on the tea estates that required direct labour.

=== Cotton ===
Cotton was first planted in the Shire valley by Eugene Sharrer, and the British Central Africa Company continued to grow cotton on its Chelumbo and Chikwawa estates. From 1903 the company also encouraged cotton cultivation by African smallholders in the Upper Shire District, by distributing cheap Egyptian cotton seed. The company gave instruction on the method of cultivation and agreed to buy the future crop at a guaranteed (but low) price. There was no significant shortage of land for peasant farming in the Upper Shire Valley, as the British Central Africa Company only exploited a small proportion of its land and, until the 1930s, the company tolerated squatters who did not pay rent on its land. Its tenants had to perform labour thangata or grow cotton for sale to the company, but in general there was plenty of land available for food production. The efforts of the colonial administration to introduce cotton as a peasant cash-crop were largely unsuccessful, as the prices paid to the peasants were low, so they concentrated on growing food. The British Central Africa Company Ltd also had a cotton ginnery for processing its own and smallholder cotton until at least 1961. In 1971, the purchase and processing of smallholder cotton was taken over by a parastatal body.

=== Tobacco ===
In 1902, Sharrer's landholdings in Cholo district were sold to the British Central Africa Company Ltd. For the first two decades of the 20th century, the area remained undeveloped and relatively under-populated. Small amounts of cotton, sisal and tobacco were grown but the tobacco was hit by disease, the value of sisal was low and the cool weather was unsuitable for cotton. With the construction of the Shire Highlands Railway from Port Herald to Blantyre, which opened in 1908, the estates began to grow Flue-cured tobacco, and The British Central Africa Company Ltd was able to interest the Imperial Tobacco Company in Nyasaland tobacco. The company imported good quality seed and brought in experts, at first aiming to produce cigar leaf, but later concentrating on flue-cured leaf for cigarettes. By 1907, the British Central Africa Company had 14 barns for flue-curing tobacco, out of a total of 119 such barns in the protectorate. At the end of the First World War, the company started a scheme for settling ex-servicemen on its undeveloped land as tobacco growers. About 50 men took up farms, usually of 1,000 acres. Many failed in the period from 1920 to 1924, as none had a farming background or any farming training. Some survived until a drastic fall in prices for flue-cured tobacco after 1927, but then took up whatever employment they could find. After 1927, the production of dark-fired tobacco by African farmers, either estate tenants or on Crown lands, overtook that of flue-cured tobacco, and the British Central Africa Company, which already had a scheme for its tenants to grow tobacco under supervision, became mostly a broker for the tobacco those tenants produced.

=== Tea ===
It took many years for tea to become a major crop in Nyasaland, and in the colonial period it was almost exclusively grown on estates. From 1922 to 1932, each year saw a small but significant increase in the acreage of tea, most of which was in Mlanje District. After 1931, tea growing expanded into Cholo District, where the British Central Africa Company had large estates, and for the two following decades the amount of tea grown increased steadily. The expansion of tea-planting in Cholo led to a shortage of African labour by 1938. During the Second World War, this labour shortage was contained, but after 1945 it became acute. In 1945, the British Central Africa Company planted 1,147 of the 12,321 acres of tea in Cholo District, making it the second largest producer in that district. The company had formerly relied on labour tenants for much of its workforce, but in 1946, its local Manager complained that thangata was virtually unenforceable, as the workers ignored their contracts with impunity. The company had a very poor relationship with the tenants on its two estates of in northern Cholo and was unable to enforce unpopular thangata agreements or Sunday working.

=== Cholo riots ===
The bulk of the 103,957 acres the company owned in the district were undeveloped, and local people wanted access to this land. After the company introduced restrictions on the size of the gardens that tenants could plant for their own use on company land in 1945, many of them refused to pay any rent. Some 1,250 tenants were threatened with eviction and, although the government limited the actual evictions to 120, those spared eviction still felt resentment towards the company. There was a further crisis in 1952 and 1953 when a collapse in world tea prices put the British Central Africa Company into a financial deficit. Its local General Manager tried to make good the loss of income by increasing tenants’ rents. Until 1952, the maximum rent permitted by the 1928 Natives on Private Estates Ordinance was 20 shillings or £1 but in that year the 1952 Africans on Private Estates Ordinance proposed an increase in the maximum to 52 shillings and sixpence (£2.625) from July 1953. Although most other estate companies agreed not to charge this maximum, the British Central Africa Company demanded the 52 shillings and sixpence maximum from December 1952. A number of tenants resisted the increase, and the company issued eviction notices, which the government was legally obliged to enforce, but was reluctant to do. In June 1953, the company agreed not to enforce either the evictions or the rent increase. However, its tenants had begun to clear land on undeveloped parts of the company's estates and start cultivation. Many local people refused to pay taxes or attend courts, and riots broke out in Cholo in August 1953, leading to eleven dead and seventy-two injured. Following these riots, Governor Colby urged that another 300,000 acres, including much British Central Africa Company land, should be acquired through voluntary purchase, but the Colonial Office did not support this, so little happened. In 1963, the company still retained a 3,500 acre tea plantation and two tea factories.

== Sources ==
- C. Baker (1993). Seeds of Trouble: Government Policy and Land Rights in Nyasaland, 1946–1964, London, British Academic Press.
- M. Vaughan (1987). The Story of an African Famine: Gender and Famine in Twentieth-Century Malawi, Cambridge University Press.
- R. Palmer (1986). Working conditions and worker responses on Nyasaland tea estates, 1930–1953, Journal of African History, Vol. 27, No. 1
- J. McCraken (2012). A History of Malawi, 1859–1966, Woodbridge, James Currey. ISBN 978-1-84701-050-6
- Tom Bower (1993). Tiny Rowland: A Rebel Tycoon, London,
- J. Telford (1987). The life story of John Telford: Footprints in the Sands of my Time, Westville (South Africa), King & Wilks.
- J. Lamport-Stokes (1983). Blantyre's Early Buildings The Society of Malawi Journal, Vol. 36, No. 2.
- Europa Publications (2003). Africa South of the Sahara 32nd Edition, Abingdon Routledge.
- Industrial Relations Court of Malawi https://web.archive.org/web/20150402194454/http://www.malawilii.org/mw/judgment/industrial-relations-court/2010/3.
- W.H.J. Rangeley (1958). The Origins of the Principal Street Names of Blantyre and Limbe, The Nyasaland Journal, Vol. 11, No. 2.
- S. Tenney and N.K. Humphreys (2011). Historical Dictionary of the International Monetary Fund, Lanham (MD), Scarecrow Press. ISBN 978-0-81086-790-1.
- The London Gazette, 30 April 1943, p. 1965 http://www.london-gazette.co.uk/issues/35998/pages/1965/page.pdf
- G.L. Gamlen (1935). Transport on the River Shire, Nyasaland, The Geographical Journal, Vol. 86, No. 5.
- J. Perry (1969). The growth of the transport network of Malawi, The Society of Malawi Journal, 1969 Vol. 22, No. 2.
- C. Baker (1994). Development Governor: Sir Geoffrey Colby - A Biography, London, British Academic Press
- The Independent Thursday 1 September 1994, Casting a flamboyant spell from a private plane, https://www.independent.co.uk/news/business/casting-a-flamboyant-spell-from-a-private-plane-1446001.html
- Sunday Times (South Africa). 8 June 1997, Tiny mourns Lonrho's journey to the breaker's yard, http://www.btimes.co.za/97/0608/news/news5.htm
- B. Pachai (1973). "Land Policies in Malawi: An Examination of the Colonial Legacy", The Journal of African History Vol. 14, No. 4.
- J.A.K. Kandawire (1977). Thangata in Pre-Colonial and Colonial Systems of Land Tenure in Southern Malawi, with Special Reference to Chingale, Africa: Journal of the International African Institute, Vol. 47, No. 2.
- L. White (1987). Magomero: Portrait of an African Village, Cambridge University Press. ISBN 0-521-32182-4
- P.T. Terry (1962). The Rise of the African Cotton Industry in Nyasaland, 1902 to 1918, The Nyasaland Journal, Vol. 15, No. 1.
- M. Vaughan (1982). Food Production and Family Labour in Southern Malawi: The Shire Highlands and Upper Shire Valley in the Early Colonial Period, The Journal of African History, Vol. 23, No. 3.
- K. Garbett (1984). Land, Labour and Cotton in the Lower Shire Valley, Malawi. Social Analysis, No. 16.
- R.B. Boeder (1982). Peasants and Plantations in the Mulanje and Thyolo Districts of Southern Malawi, 1891–1951. University of Witwatersrand African Studies Institute.
- W.H.J. Rangeley (1957). A Brief History of the Tobacco Industry in Nyasaland (Part I), The Nyasaland Journal, Vol. 10, No. 1.
- J.E.R. Emtage (1984). Reminiscences - Nyasaland 1925 – 1939, The Society of Malawi Journal, Vol. 37, No. 2.
- C.A. Baker (1962). Nyasaland, The History of its Export Trade, The Nyasaland Journal, Vol. 15, No.1.
- R. Palmer (1985). The Nyasaland Tea Industry in the Era of International Tea Restrictions, 1933–1950, Journal of African History, Vol. 26, No. 2.
