= Ormsby-Gore Commission =

The Ormsby-Gore Commission was a Parliamentary Commission, with the official title The East Africa Commission. Its chairman, William Ormsby-Gore, later the fourth Baron Harlech, was appointed in June 1924 together with two other Member of Parliament as commissioners. The terms of reference for the commission, which was appointed by the short-lived First MacDonald ministry, included to report on measures to accelerate economic development, to improve the social conditions of African residents, to investigate employment practices and to secure closer cooperation between the five British dependencies in East and Central Africa.

The commission recommended that transport and other infrastructure should be improved as a precondition of possible later administrative union. It expressed concern over issues of land ownership and the conditions of Africans living on European owned estates, and suggested that promoting commercial agriculture by Africans could be a solution to the problem of labour migration. By the time the commission reported in April 1925, the MacDonald ministry had lost power and, although Ormsby-Gore had become Under-Secretary of State for the Colonies in the new government, little action was taken on its proposals. In 1926, the Hilton Young Commission on Closer Union of the Dependencies of East and Central Africa was appointed. Its report in 1929 re-examined and supported the closer union of Kenya, Uganda and Tanganyika, but this was not acted on owing to financial constraints.

== Background ==
Following the indecisive general election of December 1923, which created a hung parliament, the Conservative government of Stanley Baldwin remained in office until January 1924 and was then replaced by the Labour government of June to November 1924. J. H. Thomas, the Secretary of State for the Colonies created an East Africa Committee, also known as the Southborough Committee, composed of sixteen members including parliamentarians and business representatives, to promote economic development and African advancement in that area.

Only a minority of East Africa Committee members represented the interests of Africans and, after it appointed the Ormsby-Gore Commission, and following the resignation of the First MacDonald ministry and the publication of that Commission's report, the Southborough Committee was disbanded in June 1925 as being no longer required. Baldwin's Conservative government which replaced MacDonald's ministry took little action on the Ormsby-Gore Commission's report, but appointed the Hilton Young Commission in 1926 to look into the possible closer union of the British territories in East and Central Africa. The later commission placed less emphasis on African advancement and more on a possible closer union of the British colonies and protectorates.

== The commission ==
In June 1924, the Parliamentary Commission officially named "The East Africa Commission" was appointed with the mandate:-

"To visit Northern Rhodesia, Nyasaland, Tanganyika Territory, Uganda, and Kenya with a view to obtaining as much information as possible in the time available on all subjects covered by the terms of reference to the East Africa Committee, and to report to the Secretary of State on any facts which they may consider have a bearing upon the above matters."

The terms of reference to the East Africa Committee were:— "To consider and report:—

(a) on the measures to be taken to accelerate the general economic development of the British East African Dependencies and the means of securing closer co-ordination of policy on such important matters as transportation, cotton-growing, and the control of human, animal, and plant diseases;

(b) on the steps necessary to ameliorate the social condition of the natives of East Africa, including improvement of health and economic development;

(c) on the economic relation between natives and non-natives with special reference to labour contracts, care of labourers, certificates of identification, employment of women and children;

(d) on the taxation of natives and the provision for services directed to their moral and material improvement".

The commission visited the Africa territories named in its mandate between August and December 1924. However, it reported that, owing to transport difficulties, its visits to Northern Rhodesia and Nyasaland were short, and it was unable to visit any of North-Eastern Rhodesia, northern Nyasaland, southern Tanganyika or the Lake Tanganyika area. Two members of the Commission also visited Zanzibar, although this was not within its original terms of reference.

== The commissioners ==
Ormsby-Gore, the commission's Chairman was the Conservative Member of Parliament (MP) for Stafford from 1910 to 1938 and Under-Secretary of State for the Colonies from 1922 to 1929, except during the period of the MacDonald ministry from June to November 1924. He was regarded by Robert Coryndon, then governor of Kenya, as being sympathetic to African peasant production and opposed to European settler demands both for control over more land for self-determination, conceding only limited suffrage to Asians and Africans. By the time he was appointed to head the commission, Ormsby-Gore was more supportive of a dual policy of Europeans producing the more valuable export crops while Africans produced food and those cash crops that did not compete with European growers, but he never accepted the political aspirations of the settlers

Besides Ormsby-Gore, a Conservative MP, the commission included A.G Church, a Labour MP and F. C. Linfield, a Liberal MP, with a senior Colonial Office civil servant as secretary. Church's main interest was promoting trade between Britain and its colonial Empire and, as a result of his visit to East Africa, he supported the political ambitions of white settlers for internal self-government on the model of Southern Rhodesia, in defiance of official Labour Party policy. Linfield also had a strong interest in colonial development and suggested the creation of an Imperial Development Board largely financed by the British exchequer. He also advocated that the African people should have sufficient land to grow both food and economic crops, rather than expanding European land ownership.

By the time the commission returned to Britain, the 1923 United Kingdom general election had taken place and Stanley Baldwin had returned at the head of a Conservative ministry in which Ormsby-Gore was again Under-Secretary of State for the Colonies. Church and Linfield both lost their parliamentary seats in the election.

== Report ==
The commission's report contained five topic sections, the three most important being on Transport and Communications, Native Policy and Trade and Commerce; sections on the six territories visited, including Zanzibar, a Conclusion and a supplementary memorandum by Linfield. Much of the information contained in the report was prepared by the colonial administrations of each territory in advance of the visit.

=== Transport and Communications ===
The commission noted that the economic development of large areas of East and Central Africa was hampered by limited transport facilities and high transport costs. It stated that the development of railways, and to some extent lake transport, should be preferred to roads as the main solution". It suggested a rail link from North-Eastern Rhodesia and Northern Nyasaland to the existing Tanganyika Railway Central Line. Although the Hilton Young Commission endorsed this proposal, no comparable link was completed before the TAZARA Railway in 1975.

The report also supported the building a Zambezi Bridge, and a detailed report proposing what became the Dona Ana Bridge was published in 1929. The commissioners realised it was unlikely that major infrastructure projects such as railways and improvements to ports would be undertaken without substantial British government investment, and recommended that, where railways were in private hands, they should be brought under state control.

=== Native Policy ===
This longest section, almost one-third of the whole report, restated the principles of the Devonshire Declaration of 1923, that the Africans in Kenya and Uganda were as much under British government "Trusteeship" as those in Tanganyika were under its League of Nations mandate, and that African interests must be paramount in Kenya. It also considered the Devonshire Declaration should apply to all British dependencies in East and Central Africa, defining "Trusteeship" as including both the social and educational development of African people and development of the economic resources of those dependencies. The commissioners accepted Indirect rule should continue where it already existed and was effective, particularly in Uganda. However, the commission considered that it was in decline elsewhere and that, where direct rule by British administrators had replaced the power of chiefs, the latter should only be used to assist these administrators.

In most of the territories, systems of land tenure included land recognised as belonging to their African peoples (native land) which was dealt with under customary law, land alienated to non-natives as freehold or leasehold land, and a residual category of Crown land, capable of being declared native land or alienated to Europeans. This last category included forests and game reserves. The commission suggested that land policy should evolve to promote individual ownership of agricultural land by Africans, that Crown land, where suitable for cultivation or pastoralism should be reserved for African use unless manifestly surplus to expected future requirements, and that African tenants on European owned-estates should be protected from exploitation.

The commission also recommended that cultivation of food resources and economic crops by Africans should be encouraged and pastoralism discouraged, except in drier areas unsuited to crop cultivation. It suggested that colonial agricultural departments should be strengthened, and the production of suitable exportable crops in each territory should be promoted. The supply of African labour for public works and on European owned-estates competed with encouraging African production, but the commission believed the shortage of labour would be reduced if the large numbers of adult males who were currently labour migrants outside their home territory were repatriated and redeployed in productive agricultural work on native land or estates, and if local employers offered better pay and conditions. Education was also seem as the path to African economic development.

African education had, before the commission's visit, been left to the missionaries, and only a small proportion of pupils had been educated beyond an elementary level. The commissioners suggested that the administration of each dependency should give financial assistance to those mission schools found to be efficient, but should also create government schools for the education of African teachers and to teach technical skills. Similarly, colonial medical and veterinary services had neglected African users, but the Commission recommended that they should be extended to reduce epidemic diseases among Africans and improve the condition of their livestock.

=== Trade and commerce ===
The commission accepted that trade and commerce was generally underdeveloped, more particularly in Nyasaland, and in Northern Rhodesia where copper mining was only just starting. International shipping and banking and credit were both underdeveloped in East Africa and this hampered economic development. The Commission recommended that the commercial law of all the territories should be standardised in line with British law, including the law relating to companies, insolvency and trademarks, and that an East African Trade Bureau should be set up in London, similar to existing Canadian and Australian trade bodies.

=== Other issues ===
The report contained a section on the serious problems caused by the tsetse fly in many areas of East and Central Africa, and suggested that the territories should coordinate efforts to eliminate the flies or their carriers and to treat human sleeping sickness and animal trypanosomiasis with a view to their eradication. It also considered the importance of promoting scientific research in many fields, including crop production, forestry, fisheries and animal husbandry, and suggested that much of this should be financed by the British Government rather than from local revenue sources.

=== Linfield's memorandum ===
In the section on the policy adopted for African labour, the report discussed the "contact theory" that Africans benefited by contact with, and especially working for, Europeans, in terms of learning skills, receiving rudimentary health care and possibly some education. The report did not fully endorse this view, mainly because much of such work was temporary. However, Linfield argued more strongly against this theory, on the basis that lengthy absences by male workers from their homes damaged African societies and reduced their ability to be self-supporting. He claimed that European skills and education were best imparted in their Africans' home and family setting. Linfield also advocated more protection for African-owned land, particularly in Kenya.

== The dependencies ==
Much of the reports on the individual territories are compilations of statistics provided by their administrations. The issues it discussed with the greatest subsequent importance are summarised below.

=== Northern Rhodesia ===
The commission considered it was important for the protectorate to have more direct railway access to the coast. It did not consider a westward route was viable, although this was built later as part of the Benguela railway once copper production became significant. Most of the European population of the protectorate lived in North-Western Rhodesia, along the line of the railway, and representatives of these settlers had proposed that all or most of North-Western Rhodesia should be amalgamated with Southern Rhodesia, and North-Eastern Rhodesia and any other areas not so amalgamated should be combined with Nyasaland in some way. The Commission did not consider such a division should be made.

=== Nyasaland ===
The report noted that production of cotton and tobacco, the two most important export crops, was declining as the land was continuously cultivated without fertilizer being applied, and the quality of both crops grown was poor. The protectorate's difficult financial position was caused by large debts incurred in the construction of the Shire Highlands Railway and its extension: the commission hoped it would be improved if the Zambezi Bridge were built and the railway extended to the port of Beira, Mozambique. The commission also expressed concern at the large amount of land alienated to Europeans under Certificates of Claim, and the under-development of much of this alienated land.

=== Tanganyika ===
Tanganyika, which had been ravaged by fighting in the East African Campaign of the First World War, was a League of Nations mandated territory, whose administration was to be carried on in line with the mandate of 1922. The existence of this mandate, which suggested impermanence, and the wartime destruction had hampered investment and many government departments were under-staffed or under-resourced. The commission considered that the territory could best be developed if the existing railways were repaired and extended and roads and port facilities improved.

=== Zanzibar ===
Zanzibar had become a British protectorate in 1890 after Germany had secured the cessation of most of its mainland territories to German East Africa, and was ruled by a sultan advised, initially by a locally based British resident. However, the governor of Kenya, based in Nairobi had, since 1914, also been the British High Commissioner for Zanzibar, an arrangement that caused delays, as no matters of importance could be settled locally. The commissioners recommended that the post of High Commissioner should be abolished and its powers devolved to the British resident. They also recommended replacing the Sultan's consultative Protectorate Council with a Legislative Council, as was normal in other African dependencies, and including more unofficial members.

=== Uganda ===
The commission recommended the extension of the Uganda Railway west and north of its existing terminus, to open more areas for cotton cultivation, the most valuable export of the protectorate, and to reduce transport costs in those areas where cotton was already grown. It also referred to the problems that had arisen in the Kingdom of Buganda over pre-colonial land rights, and the more general issue of the relationship of Buganda to the protectorate

=== Kenya ===
The colonial administration had encouraged Europeans to settle as farmers in the colony since 1903, and numbers had increased significantly after the First World War. In consequence, a considerable proportion of Kenya's best agricultural land had been allocated to these settlers as medium-sized or large farms, and the bulk of export crops were grown on these farms. African agriculture had been neglected, but the commission suggested that growing maize and groundnuts for domestic consumption and export should be encouraged by training African instructors. The extension of European agriculture was causing demands for African workers that competed with opportunities for them to cultivate their own land or to migrate to work in the towns. As the supply of African labour was limited, the commission advocated limiting the influx of settlers wishing to take on new large farms and restricting further conversion of African-occupied lands into such farms

== Aftermath ==
Much of the work of the Ormsby-Gore Commission was called into question by the change in government which took place while its members were in Africa. However, the subsequent Hilton Young Commission endorsed certain of the earlier commission's conclusions, including the desirability of not including Nyasaland and Northern Rhodesia in any East African union, at least initially. A majority, excluding the chairman, also discounted the idea that all or part of Northern Rhodesia should be amalgamated with Southern Rhodesia. The Hilton Young Commission also accepted that African interests must be paramount, that African development must be the first priority of all the colonial administrations and that indigenous African communities should have enough land reserved for them to grow sufficient food and economic crops, and that this land should not be available to be alienated to non-Africans. These all reflected the Ormsby-Gore Commission findings.

Shortly before the East Africa Commission was appointed, the Secretary of State for the Colonies had appointed an Advisory Committee on Native Education in the British Tropical African Dependencies, which included Ormsby-Gore and Church, two Anglican bishops and five other members. The Advisory Committee reported after Ormsby-Gore and Church had returned from East Africa, and its report included the results of their review of educational provision in East and Central Africa. This report advocated adapting teaching to the needs of the local communities by using vernacular languages as well as English, training more African teachers and establishing higher-level vocational and technical training. It also promoted the education of girls and young women and the establishment of a hierarchy of schools that would eventually include university-level institutions. This report formed the basis for educational development in East Africa until the late 1940s. Although the numbers attending schools did not increase beyond one-third of school-age children, the majority of these had at least four years' of education and, between 1925 and 1939 the standard of education in the British dependencies in Africa improved considerably and secondary education became available, although only to a small number of pupils. In all of these areas, Ormsby-Gore laid the educational foundations for the first generation of African professional men and women in these territories, and for such future political leaders as Jomo Kenyatta, Kwame Nkrumah and Jaramogi Oginga Odinga

Ormsby-Gore was promoted away from the Colonial Office in 1929, but returned as Secretary of State for the Colonies between 1936 and 1938. In 1936, he announced that the government had no plans for the political amalgamation either of East Africa or the Rhodesias, and continued to promote education and railway development in East Africa, but much of his time was taken up with the situation in Palestine

== Sources ==
- M. R. Dilley, (1966). British Policy in Kenya Colony (second edition), London, Frank Cass & Co. ISBN 0-71461-655-9.
- P. S. Gupta (1975). Imperialism and the British Labour Movement, 1914–1964. London, Macmillan Press. ISBN 978-1-34902-441-4.
- F. F Hammond (1929) Report on the Nyasaland railways and proposed Zambesi Bridge, London, HMSO.
- Hansard, (1936). House of Commons, 10 June 1936, vol. 313, col. 194.
- E. Hilton Young, R. Mant, G Schuster and J H Oldham. (1929) Report of the Commission on Closer Union of the Dependencies in East and Central Africa, London, HMSO.https://www.scribd.com/doc/74835698/CAB-24-201-Report-of-the-Commission-on-Closer-Union-of-the-Dependencies-in-Eastern-and-Central-Africa-1929
- O. J. M. Kalinga, (2012), Historical Dictionary off Malawi, (4th edition), Lanham, Rowman and Littlefield. . ISBN 978-0-81085-961-6.
- R. R. Kuczynski, (1948). Demographic Survey of the British Colonial Empire (Vol. 2). Oxford University Press. https://archive.org/details/in.ernet.dli.2015.275004
- B. Malinowski, (1929). Report of the Commission on Closer Union of the Dependencies in Eastern and Central Africa, Africa: Journal of the International African Institute Vol. 2, No. 3.
- R. Miller, (2016). Britain, Palestine and Empire: The Mandate Years pp. 164–8, London, Routledge. ISBN 978-0-75466-808-4.
- B. R. Mngomezulu, (2012). Politics and Higher Education in East Africa: (From the 1920s to 1970), Bloemfontein, Sun Press. ISBN 978-1-92038-211-7.
- A. B. Mukwaya, (1953). Land Tenure in Buganda, Kampala, Makerere Institute of Social Research, East African Studies No. 1.
- R. Oliver and A. Atmore, (2005). Africa since 1800 (fifth edition). Cambridge University Press. ISBN 0-52183-615-8.
- W. Ormsby-Gore, the Bishop of Liverpool, A. G. Church and others (1925). Educational Policy in British Tropical Africa (Cmd 2374). London, His Majesty's Stationery Office.http://www.historicalpapers.wits.ac.za/inventories/inv_pdfo/AD1715/AD1715-19-27-001-jpeg.pdf
- W. Ormsby-Gore, A. G. Church and F. C. Linfield (1925). Report of the East Africa Commission (Cmd. 2387). London, His Majesty's Stationery Office.http://www.waado.org/colonial_rule/east_africa/east_africa_commission_1925.pdf
- H. I Wetherell, (1979). Settler Expansionism in Central Africa: The Imperial Response of 1931 and Subsequent Implications, African Affairs, Vol. 78, No. 311.
- C. P. Youé, (1986). Robert Thorne Coryndon: Proconsular Imperialism in Southern and Eastern Africa, 1897-1925. Waterloo, Wilfrid Laurier University Press. ISBN 9780861402045
