= Chindio =

- Village
- Location within Mozambique
- Coordinates: 17.678681°S 35.272613°E
- Country: Mozambique
- Provinces: Tete Province
- District: Mutarara District
- Elevation: 176 m (577 ft)

Chindio was a village and rail and ferry terminal on the north bank of the Zambezi River in Mozambique, downstream of its junction with the Shire River. As the railway and ferry have been defunct since 1935, the name Chindio no longer appears on modern maps. The present day village of Chingano is in roughly the same location.

Chindio is not the same place as Chinde, although they are both on the Zambezi and in Mozambique.

Between 1908 and 1914, riverboat services ran from the terminus of the Shire Highlands Railway at Port Herald in Nyasaland, now Malawi to the British concession of Chinde at the mouth of the Zambezi in Mozambique, where passengers and goods were transferred to seagoing ships. This was the main route for goods and passengers to and from Nyasaland. However, as the Shire River was difficult to navigate in the dry season when water levels were low, the British South Africa Company built the Central African Railway, 61 miles long, from Port Herald to Chindio on the north bank of the Zambezi. This line was opened in 1914. Between 1914 and 1922, the African Lakes Corporation and British Central Africa Company both ran steamer services from Chindio to Chinde in the dry season, but from Port Herald to Chinde when water levels were sufficient. In 1922, the Trans-Zambezia Railway Ltd completed its line from Murraça, on the south bank of the Zambezi opposite Chindio to Beira, and cross-river ferries ran between the Chindio and Murraça.

For two months in the dry season the capacity of the ferry was limited and wet-season floods often washed parts of the railway track away. In 1937, a Zambezi Bridge, the Dona Ana Bridge was opened at Mutarara near Sena, 25 miles upriver from Chindio, with a new alignment of track via Sena connecting the Central African Railway to the Trans-Zambezia Railway. The line on the north bank of the Zambezi to Chindio was abandoned, and the ferry closed.
