= Thangata =

Term with various meanings in Malawian agriculture

Thangata is a word deriving from the Chewa language of Malawi which has changed its meaning several times, although all meanings relate to agriculture. Its original, pre-colonial usage related to reciprocal help given in neighbours' fields or freely-given agricultural labour as thanks for a benefit. In colonial times, between 1891 and 1962, it generally meant agricultural labour given in lieu of a cash rent, and generally without any payment, by a tenant on an estate owned by a European. Thangata was often exploited, and tenants could be forced to work on the owners' crops for four to six months annually when they could have cultivated their own crops. From the 1920s, the name thangata was extended to situations where tenants were given seeds to grow set quotas of designated crops instead of providing cash or labour. Both forms of thangata were abolished in 1962, but both before and after independence and up to the present, the term has been used for short-term rural casual work, often on tobacco estates, which is considered by workers to be exploitative.

== Thangata in Malawi ==
=== Origins and meaning ===
The term "thangata" has had several meanings in Malawi in the last 120 years, and its traditional or pre-colonial use was very different from its uses in colonial and modern times. The word exists in the Chewa and the related Mang'anja languages, and its first pre-colonial meaning was "help" or "to assist", in the sense of freely-given reciprocal help such as neighbours might give each other building huts or clearing fields. It also had the meaning of the agricultural work that a member of the village community did for his chief. The ownership of land in much of Malawi was vested in the community, not individuals. Traditional leaders acted as trustees over communal land, and granted the right to use it to individuals in their communities. By custom, these leaders received in gifts in kind or labour from those in their community who had benefited. This was also called thangata: although the term was first recorded with this meaning in 1921, the practice is believed to have existed for many centuries before then. When communal land was plentiful, community leaders could not demand thangata, but once it became scarcer in the colonial period, and particularly after the introduction of Indirect rule on 1933, the chiefs could impose a condition of thangata work on any grant. In the last two or three decades, chiefs have begun to require cash sums or rents to allow the use of communal land, but these cash payments are not called thangata.

=== In early colonial Nyasaland ===
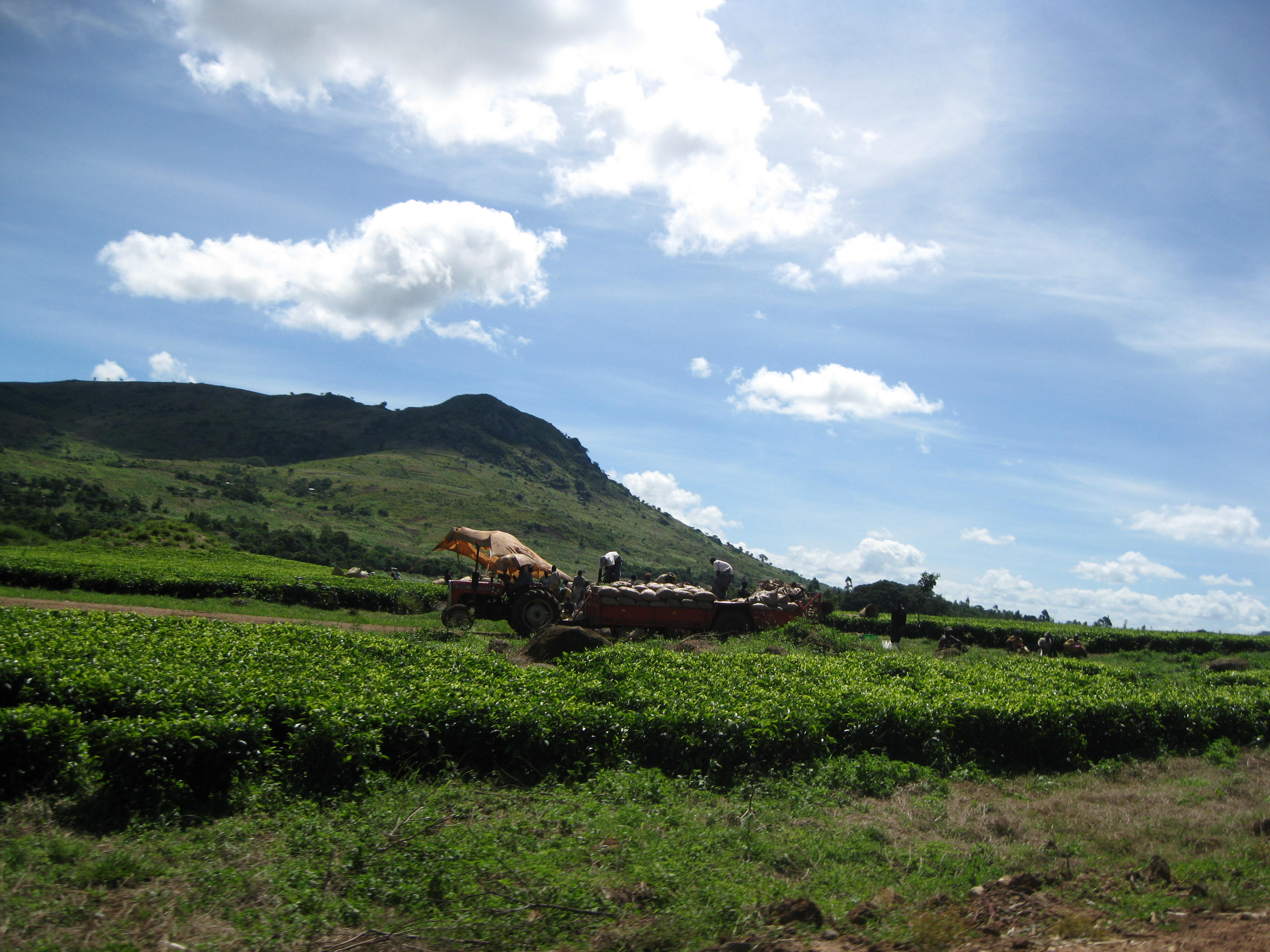
Modern-day view of a tea plantation near Mulanje

The 1870s and 1880s in Malawi were unsettled, and local chiefs sought to gain European protection from their enemies by granting the settlers what they probably considered was only a right to cultivate vacant land. Soon after the British Central Africa Protectorate was proclaimed in 1891, these Europeans secured legal ownership of this land from the protectorate administration. The new owners also claimed all rights that the traditional leaders had or were thought to possess, asserting that thangata work was an obligation that the landlord could impose on tenants. In the early colonial period, thangata took on a new meaning of performing labour in lieu of rent. In the early years of the protectorate, the estates established in under-populated areas needed workers to establish plantations. Few Africans were resident on estate lands, and some of those who remained left when labour rents were introduced. New workers, who were often migrants from Mozambique, were encouraged to move onto estates and grow their own crops, but were required to pay rent and Hut tax, usually satisfied by two months' labour a year at this time.

Before 1905, relatively little land on the estates was planted, as the owners were experimenting with a variety of crops. However, from 1905, cotton was successfully grown in commercial quantities. Cotton has a 5 or 6 month growing season, throughout which it needs much labour, particularly for weeding and gathering, to achieve a successful result. Between 1910 and 1925, tobacco was also grown in plantations and, like cotton, it required a great deal of labour to grow successfully. As tenancies were based on verbal contracts, tenants had little or no chance to dispute the owners' interpretations of their conditions. On several estates, the obligations of labour tenants were extended, sometimes to a total of four or five months a year, for thangata labour rent and Hut tax. Much of this labour was demanded in the growing season, leaving tenants with little time to grow their own food. As the Crown lands near the estates were already crowded, and as most of estate tenants were migrants from Mozambique with no claim to communal land, they had little option but to remain. In this situation thangata came to mean forced labour.

=== Attempted reform and opposition ===
The Nyasaland High Court in 1903 exempted the original inhabitants of estates from thangata and gave them some security. Legislation allowing other tenants to pay rent rather than thangata, and to receive cash wages if they performed more than the required thangata was enacted in 1908, but not implemented. Soon after the outbreak of the First World War, in December 1914, the Nyasaland government introduced a Nyasaland Defence Ordinance, requiring men to serve as porters in support of local armed forces. This service was equated with thangata, as those conscripted were forced to work on something that did not benefit them. The harshness of thangata, including the conscription of porters was at least one of the reasons underlying the 1915 uprising led by John Chilembwe. Following this revolt, a new attempt to abolish thangata in favour of cash rent was made, but it failed because of the political influence of the estate owners that opposed the measure. The thangata system was a bar to progress and impoverished people by limiting the amount of time they could work for themselves. There was no place for crafts or skills in thangata: it reduced all tenants to unskilled manual labour, and was likened to a form of serfdom.

Even after Chilembwe's revolt, the labour obligation on many estates was only slightly modified, sometimes amounting to six months for thangata and rent. When the Ormsby-Gore East African Commission visited Nyasaland in 1924, it was highly critical of the treatment of all Africans resident on private estates tenants supplying their labour, contrary to the exemption from thangata offered to those who were occupants when the original certificates of title certificates were granted. The commission suggested that, even though recent immigrants were not entitled to the same protection, they should be treated in the same way as the original residents and excused from thangata. However, local administrators were subject ti settler pressure and, although some abuses were curtailed, others such as equating a month of thangata to 30 days (or five weeks of six days' work), and requiring the wives of absent migrant workers, widows and single women to work in breach of custom, persisted. However, by 1918 most cotton, and by 1925 most tobacco, was not grown on estates by direct labour, but by smallholders on Crown lands. As the demand for estate labour declined in the 1920s, the owners claimed that, as they had insufficient work for their tenants to meet their thangata obligations, they had become rent-free squatters.

=== In later colonial Nyasaland ===
Some smaller estates failed, but others were saved from collapse by a scheme that was first adopted by one large owner, The British Central Africa Company Ltd. Instead of using direct labour, it issued seeds to tenants, who could grow cotton and tobacco under supervision and sell their crops to the planters at low prices. This system was formalised in legislation, the 1928 Natives on Private Estates Ordinance, which modified thangata by allowing rents to be paid in cash, in a fixed quantity of acceptable crops or by direct labour. The true value of the crop, usually tobacco, given in lieu of rent greatly exceeded the nominal cash rent, and some landlords refused to accept cash when it was offered.

Estate landlords also benefited from restrictions on smallholders growing tobacco on Crown lands, who might otherwise have competed with the estate tenants. Although the estates now largely acted as brokers for their tenants' produce and the name thangata, "tobacco thangata", named after its most common form, was sometimes applied to rent in kind. The older form of labour thangata persisted on tea estates and elsewhere if the owner wished to grow crops through direct labour.

It was estimated that about 9% of Malawi's Africans lived on estates in 1911: in 1945, it was about 10% with 173,000 residents on estates in 49,000 families. In the 1940s and the early 1950s, there were tensions between estate owners and tenants over evictions and the tenants' wish to sell produce of their choice in local markets, not through the owner. The expansion of tea-planting led to a shortage of African labour, which became acute after 1945. The British Central Africa Company Ltd had relied on labour tenants for most of its workforce, but in 1946m its local Mmnager complained that the company was unable to enforce unpopular thangata agreements or Sunday working although it had threatened many tenants with eviction.

There was a further crisis in 1952–1953, when the British Central Africa Company tried to increase tenants' rents substantially against the advice of the Nyasaland government. A number of tenants resisted the increase, and the company issued eviction notices to them. The tenants' resistance included clearing land for cultivation on the undeveloped parts of the company's estates and refusing to pay taxes or attend courts. Riots broke out in Cholo in August 1953, and attempts to quell rioting led to 11 dead and 72 injured. The tensions were lessened by government purchases of the land of former estates for resettlement and so by 1962, the number of estate residents had been reduced to 9,000 families. In 1962, the 1928 Ordinance was replaced by a 1962 Africans on Private Estates Ordinance that granted tenants security of tenure and abolished all forms of thangata that required labour or the production of amounts of designated crops by replacing them with cash rents.

Although tenants had produced tobacco on many estates in the Southern Region, by 1935, 70% of the national tobacco crop was grown in the Central Region, which had fewer freehold estates. At first, the tobacco was grown by Africans on Crown land, and later, leasehold land of former Crown land had been granted to Europeans. The leaseholders engaged African sharecroppers under contract to grow one annual tobacco crop at a time, the "visiting tenant" system. Ithad some similarities to estate tenancies in the Shire Highlands (called thangata, whether the rent was satisfied in labour or produce), but it was distinct, as the visiting tenants had permanent homes away from the places where they grew their crop. Like estate tenants, visiting tenants were underpaid for their crop because they were forced to sell it to the landowner.

Although it was originally distinct from thangata, in 1963 shortly before independence, Hastings Banda, who was Minister of Agriculture, fiercely attacked the visiting tenant system and equated it to the hated thangata. Despite this rhetoric, when thangata was abolished in 1962, a temporary exemption was given for visiting tenants in the Central Region. However, using the term thangata to apply to the visiting tenant system for political purposes both extended its meaning to a situation to which it had not previously applied and made its meaning less clear.

=== In post-colonial Malawi ===
By the late 1960s, politicians of the ruling Malawi Congress Party were involved in tobacco growing on the former European estates that the colonial government had bought, and which were sold or leased to the party elite after independence. Further elite-run estates were later created on what had previously been communal lands. By 1990, there were 675,000 registered estate tenants with little security, and another 580,000 "squatters" lived on surplus land with no security, who formed a pool of casual labour. Few tenants or squatters grew all their own food and most relied on casual paid labour or food-for-work arrangements on the estates to supplement what they could grow. The preferred term for short-term rural casual work paid for in cash or in kind (usually food) is ganyu.

The term "Ganyu" is said to derive from the Portuguese "ganho" (sometimes spelled "ganyao"), meaning something gained or a bonus. It originally denoted food or beer given as appreciation for neighbours when they worked on another's fields, then the work a poor person did for food or cash for more prosperous neighbour. Tobacco estates are now the largest employers of ganyu workers, who may stay for the growing season or be visiting tenants, or they may travel daily. Larger estates may pay the minimum cash wage; smaller estates usually only give food. These arrangements are sometimes called thangata, as in the 2007 documentary "Thangata: social bondage and big tobacco in Malawi".

== Similar systems ==
Of all countries in Southern and Central Africa, Nyasaland was the most notorious for the duration of thangata and its importance to the colonial economy. Labour tenancy and sharecropping continued to exist in other less developed parts of Southern and Central Africa in the 20th century but without the same social and political impact as in Nyasaland. In much of South Africa and Southern and North-Western Rhodesia, the growth of the money economy rapidly led to waged employment that replaced labour in lieu of rent, and in North-Eastern Rhodesia estate, agriculture was less dominant and land reasonably plentiful. In early Natal, the shortage of capital caused landowners to extract rent from African tenants in the forms of produce or labour, which applied in Zululand until the early 20th century. However, in central Natal, employment for wages took over in the last third of the 19th century. African tenant farmers on European-owned estates in Matabeleland in the early colonial period could either pay rent or provide labour in lieu of rent, but after 1910, it was more usual for these estates to employ Africans for wages.

The system that is probably closest to thangata is the institution that was called ubureetwa in Rwanda. Although there were few European landowners, the traditional leaders who controlled access land were from the dominant Tutsi group. The Europeans, after their occupation, manipulated what had previously been freely-given labour into an unpaid agricultural labour obligation. As Rwanda had a mobile population, chiefs could allocate land to clients outside the community that had a traditional claim to use the land, in a clear parallel to the Mozambican migrants on Nyasaland estates. The Rwandan incomers were prepared to agree to accept a heavy burden of labour for access to land. The colonial administration in Rwanda gave a legal status to ubureetwa and until the 1950s resisted abolishing it or commuting it to cash.

In the Congo Free State, forced labour amounting to virtual slavery was widely used by the government on public works and to compel Africans to gather ivory or wild rubber. Although forced labour in the Belgian Congo was abolished in theory in 1908, the government from 1917 implemented a system of forced cultivation of cotton, coffee and rice, which began to be imposed on the peasant population, who were required to use their own land for one or more of these designated crops. On Belgian-owned estates, a Labour Code introduced in 1922 allowed employers to physically discipline their workers, so supposedly free labour was turned into a system of forced labour. However, the peasants and estate workers were not tenants and so the system was rather different from thangata.
