= Eugene Sharrer =

German-born British colonial entrepreneur

Eugene Charles Albert Sharrer was a German-born British subject who became one of the most influential colonial entrepreneurs in British Central Africa (now Malawi) during the late 19th and early 20th centuries. Active from 1888 to the early 1900s, he established a commercial empire that spanned retail and wholesale trading, large-scale land acquisition, agricultural estates, and river transport. He initially traded in ivory, then expanded into plantation agriculture, holding more land under cultivation than any other European settler, and was the first to grow cotton in the Middle Shire valley. He founded Kubula Stores Ltd, operated a fleet of steamers through Sharrer's Zambezi Traffic Company, and played a leading role in founding the Shire Highlands Railway Company.

Sharrer was a central figure in the formation of settler political associations that lobbied for European commercial interests. In 1902, he consolidated his companies, including agricultural estates, trading operations, and transport concerns, into the British Central Africa Company Ltd, becoming its principal shareholder. He left the territory shortly thereafter but retained financial ties. Little is known about his life prior to 1888. He died in London during the First World War while interned as a German national.

== Arrival in Central Africa ==
Very little is known about the early life of Eugene Sharrer, and his date or even year of birth is unknown. It is recorded that he was by origin a German from Hamburg and claimed to be a British subject by naturalisation. He was described as of Jewish appearance, if not of Jewish origin, by a colonial official and became an archetypal colonial outsider, financially successful but disliked by officials because of his national and ethnic origins. He arrived in what is today Malawi in 1888, before the country had become a British protectorate, with a consignment of trade goods and he initially joined forces with John Buchanan who had been trading there since 1881, but soon started trading on his own account. Sharrer was involved in the trade in ivory, until 1893 the main export product of the area, and from this trading venture there developed the wholesale and retail Kubula Stores Ltd. When the ivory trade declined as the elephants were killed off, he diversified, acquiring considerable landholdings and building up a successful transport and agricultural concern. Kubula Stores Ltd failed to compete with the rural network of "Mandala" village stores of the African Lakes Company and was sold to this rival in the 1920s.

Although a British consul was resident in Central Africa from 1883, as late as 1888 the British Foreign Office declined to accept responsibility to protect the tiny British settlements there. Sharrer claimed to have purchased 363,034 acres in the area, and had attempted to induce chiefs to give up all their rights to their land. He may have intended to form his own Chartered company, or as Harry Johnston who was appointed as British consul in 1891 suspected, to acquire a form of sovereignty over the Shire Highlands and sell his rights either to Britain or Germany. Johnston rejected the suggestion that any treaties made before the British Central Africa Protectorate was established in 1891 could transfer sovereignty to Sharrer, but he accepted that these treaties were evidence of sales of land to him.

== Development and Consolidation ==
The declaration of the protectorate left Sharrer in possession of three large and two smaller estates, initially largely undeveloped. Unlike other large landowners, whose holdings were concentrated in the Shire Highlands, about half of Sharrer's land was in the Shire valley. Sharrer sold off some land near the main settlement of Blantyre and also experimented with a variety of crops. He first tried coffee, and by 1891 he had the greatest area of coffee planted in the protectorate. He soon followed this up with tobacco, and was the first settler to grow cotton in the Middle Shire valley from 1901. By 1902 when Sharrer's landholdings were transferred to the British Central Africa Company Ltd, only a few thousand acres were being cultivated, although his estates had more land under cultivation than any other European landowner. Sharrer was one of the leading estate owners and formed the Shire Highland Planters Association in November 1891, becoming its Chairman. In 1895, it joined with its rival, the Nyasaland Planters Association, to form the British Central Africa Chamber of Agriculture and Commerce, a powerful pressure group for European planters and their businesses.

Perhaps because three of his estates were in the Shire River, in the 1890s Sharrer also built up and operated a fleet of steamers on the Zambezi and Shire rivers through a company named Sharrer's Zambezi Traffic Company Ltd. In 1890, the Portuguese government had granted the British government a Concession to establish a port Chinde on the Zambezi River delta. At the end of the 19th century, ocean-going ships were met at Chinde by small river steamers which took passengers and goods up the Zambezi and Shire rivers to British Central Africa, a journey of around seven days. The African Lakes Company maintained around six steamers on the rivers, and Sharrer's Zambezi Traffic Company had three more of 20 to 30 tons on this route. The business of Sharrer's Zambezi Traffic Company Ltd was transferred to the British Central Africa Company Ltd in 1902 and the company was liquidated in 1903.

Transport from the economic centre of Shire Highlands to river ports was by inefficient and costly head porter, and low water levels in the rivers made water transport difficult. Sharrer took the initiative in proposing the construction of a railway to the most suitable river port, Chiromo and the prospectus for the Shire Highlands Railway Company Ltd was published in December 1895. As Sharrer had acquired much of the land over which the proposed railway was to run, there was disagreement over the route, particularly from the African Lakes Company. Because of this and delays over raising capital and loans for construction, and it was not until early 1903 that construction work began. Sharrer became a director of the Shire Highlands Railway Company Ltd and continued as such after he left the protectorate, and was also a director of the Central Africa Railway Company Ltd which was built after his departure.

== Departure ==
In 1902, Sharrer formed the British Central Africa Company Ltd to consolidate his interests in the Shire Highlands Railway Company Ltd, his estates, Kubula Stores Ltd and Sharrer's Zambezi Traffic Company. He became a director and the principal shareholder of the British Central Africa Company Ltd, and Harry Johnston also became one of its directors. Shortly after this he left British Central Africa permanently for London, although retaining his financial interests in the territory. Eugene Sharrer died in London during the First World War when under confinement as a German by the Custodian of Enemy Property. His heirs could not be traced.

== See also ==
- British Central Africa Protectorate
- Category:Malawi
- African Lakes
- Henry Hamilton Johnston
- Malawi Railways
