= Natives on Private Estates Ordinance 1928 =

Colonial ordinance of the Nyasaland Protectorate

The Natives on Private Estates Ordinance, 1928 was a colonial ordinance passed by the Legislative Council of the Nyasaland Protectorate (now Malawi). The body was composed mainly of senior colonial officials, with a minority of nominated members, to represent European residents. The ordinance regulated the conditions under which land could be farmed by African tenants on estates owned by European settlers within that protectorate. The legislation corrected some of the worst abuses of the system of thangata under which tenants were required to work for the estate owner in lieu of paying rent.

However, the ordinance failed in its intention of encouraging these tenants to increase the production of crops on the undeveloped land within those estates because of the worldwide 1930s Great Depression. Tensions between estate owners and tenants continued in the 1940s and the early 1950s over evictions and the tenants’ desire to market their produce freely.

The legislation was modified in 1952 to meet some of these problems. It was only After the colonial government's purchase of estate lands to resettle former tenants after 1952 and the final abolition of thangata by the Africans on Private Estates Ordinance, 1962, which was passed shortly before independence, that an African peasantry was created with free access to farmland.

== Tenants on private estates ==
In the three decades after 1860, southern Malawi was transformed by a combination of warfare and raiding for slaves and ivory from a region where farming supported a reasonable population to one where the lack of security led to the widespread abandonment of agriculture land. Local chiefs attempted to gain protection from European settlers by granting them the right to cultivate land which, although fertile, was insecure and therefore vacant. Once the British Central Africa Protectorate had been proclaimed in 1891, these settlers gained legal ownership of this land from the protectorate administration. Although many of the grants contained “non-disturbance” clauses allowing resident Africans to continue to cultivate their existing fields rent-free, most owners claimed the right to demand labour in exchange for allowing them farm part of the estate land. The Nyasaland settlers adopted the term “thangata” for this from the Chewa language, where it meant freely-given help with agricultural work, but its colonial meaning was performing labour in lieu of rent.

In the early years of the Nyasaland protectorate, land was abundant but workers were in short supply. The estates needed workers to establish plantations, but many estates had been established in areas where few Africans lived because of insecurity. When the owners attempted to introduce labour rents, some of those who were living there moved to the rent-free land that their community had retained. New workers, often migrants escaping from harsh conditions in Mozambique, who did not belong to any local community, so had no claim to farm communal land, were encouraged to move onto estates and grow their own crops, but were required to pay rent and Hut tax, at first usually satisfied by two months’ labour a year. Before 1905, relatively little estate land was planted, because the owners still searched for economically viable crops. However, cotton was grown commercially in the south of the protectorate from 1905. Cotton needs a great deal of labour, particularly for planting and weeding, throughout its five or six month growing season for successful results. Between 1910 and 1925, tobacco was also grown in plantations and, like cotton, it required a significant amount of labour over several months. On several estates, labour tenants’ obligations were now extended, sometimes to a total of four to six months of thangata, to pay for the tenant's rent and Hut tax, leaving tenants with little time to grow their own food, as labour was demanded in the main growing season. A number of abuses grew up, including under-recording days worked, not making cash payments if tenants performed more than the required thangata and requiring 30 days work (five weeks of six days) for each month of thangata obligation. The wives of absent migrant workers, widows and single women were also forced to do thangata work, in breach of custom. In 1903, the Nyasaland High Court declared the original inhabitants of estates that had received government grants that contained “non-disturbance” clauses were exempt from thangata and had security of tenure. Legislation regulating some aspects of thangata was enacted in 1908, but not implemented in practice. The harshness of thangata was one reasons for the 1915 uprising led by John Chilembwe.

Following Chilembwe's rising, a radical new government ordinance was made in 1917 that attempted to abolish thangata in favour if cash rents by making it illegal for landowners to require labour services in lieu of rent. Had this measure taken effect, thangata would have been abolished, but it failed to be implemented because the estate owners threatened to evict large numbers of tenants who were in excess of their requirements for workers. Those evicted would become a pool of landless casual labour that the estates need only call on when they required. Even though the government acceded to the owners' threats, the latter still chose to expel significant numbers of tenants unable to work or considered to be troublesome in favour of tractable migrants from Mozambique.

Of the estate crops grown by direct labour, coffee had failed by 1905, cotton by 1918, and tobacco by 1925: only tea continued as a profitable estate crop. Some estates in the lower Shire River valley were abandoned and, on other estates, cultivation was scaled back. Most tobacco was now grown by smallholders on Crown land. As the demand for estate labour declined in the 1920s, the owners had insufficient work for their tenants to meet their thangata obligations and claimed that their tenants had become rent-free squatters who should be evicted if they refused to grow economic crops. Larger estates were saved from collapse by replacing direct labour with the scheme of tenants growing cotton and tobacco and selling these to the planters at low prices. This system was formalised in legislation, the 1928 Natives on Private Estates Ordinance, which modified thangata by allowing rents to be paid in cash, by a fixed quantity of acceptable crops or by direct labour. The estates now acted largely as brokers for their tenants’ produce, although the name thangata was now applied to rent in kind as well as labour rent. The older form of labour thangata persisted where owners wished to grow crops through direct labour. It was estimated that about 9% of Malawi’s Africans lived on estates in 1911. In 1945, it was about 10%, or 173,000 residents in 49,000 families. By 1962, this had been reduced to 9,000 families

== The legislation ==
Following the First World War, a Land Commission was set up in 1920 to determine how much of the land in Nyasaland should be made available for future European settlement, which of the existing rights of estate tenants should be preserved and what new ones should be given to them. The Commission recommended that all permanent rent-free tenancies under non-disturbance clauses should end, but that exiting tenants-at-will, who could be evicted without cause or notice under the existing rules, should be given some security of tenure. Apart from the elderly or widows, all tenants should pay rent, which could be satisfied in cash, in kind or by providing labour. The owners should also have the right to evict surplus tenants to stop their estates becoming overcrowded. The Colonial Office opposed abolishing rights under non-disturbance clauses without a long fixed tenancies, and a five-year term was agreed. By the time legislation was prepared in 1928, there was little demand for new European-owned plantations, as the existing estates were ending direct crop production in favour of marketing tenants’ produce. The legislation enacted in 1928 therefore emphasised that rents could be satisfied by delivering a fixed quantity of acceptable crops to the owner as well as by direct labour or in cash. It met some of the estate owners’ demands but also gave some protection to tenants from the worst excesses of thangata.

The question of how rents could be paid was a significant one: a Land Commission of 1903 reported that normal annual rent and Hut tax burden of tenants was six shillings, and from 1911 the legislation provided the option of providing fixed amounts of tobacco or cotton. However, estate owners in the early 20th century expected that their tenants would work for at least two months rather than pay rent in cash or kind. As the demand for labour increased, owners refused to accept cash, so the rent of six shillings, which remained virtually unchanged for over two decades before 1928, was purely nominal. By 1928, the value of the several months’ labour actually provided was roughly £1.

The full title of the legislation was “An Ordinance to Regulate the Position of Natives residing on Private Estates, (No 14 of 1928)” and it was normally called the Natives on Private Estates Ordinance, 1928. The Ordinance created a class of registered “Resident Natives”, who had entered into tenancy agreements: only these and their families had the right to live on the private estate of which they were tenants for the term of their lease. Male children of residents lost the right to live on estates at 16 years old, and owners could refuse to allow the husband of a resident’s daughter the right to settle. Every registered tenant, except the elderly or widows, had to pay a rent which could be satisfied in cash, by labour or by giving produce to the owner. From 1928, District Rent Boards fixed maximum cash rents: most chose a rate of £1 for an eight acre tenant’s plot although some estates charged less. The Boards also designated which crops were acceptable as rent in kind (mainly tobacco or cotton, sometimes maize) and fixed the amounts that had to be delivered to satisfy the cash equivalent of the rent in kind for the district. The required value of the different acceptable crops was generally fixed at between 30 and 50 shillings instead of the £1 cash rent. The value of maize required was fixed at particularly high levels, to discourage tenants from growing maize rather than exportable crops.

The owners of estates over 10,000 acres would be allowed to expel up to 10% of their tenants starting in 1933, and at five yearly intervals thereafter, without showing any cause: those expelled were to be re-settled on Crown Lands. There was provision for future compulsory purchase of up to 10% of estates over 10,000 acres as a last resort, if no Crown Lands were available. All owners could expel other tenants for cause at any time, including boys reaching the age of 16 and widowers of residents' daughter

== The effects of the legislation ==
The Natives on Private Estates Ordinance was intended to encourage African tenants to increase production, particularly of the more economically important exportable crops, on the large amounts of undeveloped estate land within Nyasaland. It failed because, in the world-wide economic depression of the early 1930s, estate owners could not buy all the crops offered in lieu of rent or employ all the labour that was available. It also failed to provide a permanent solution to the land question, as it neither deal with the problem of estate land that was under-utilised but not freely available to African farmers, nor with the owners' ability to evict tenants. The first evictions allowed under the Ordinance were due in 1933, but no large-scale evictions took place then. There were few evictions in 1938 either, because District Commissioners refused to enforce them where no land for the resettlement for those to be evicted was available.

Evictions in 1943 were also limited, as hundreds of Africans told to leave estates in the Blantyre District refused to leave, as there was no land for them to go to, and the colonial authorities declined to use force. The Governor expected that more evictions would take place in 1948 and also anticipated considerable trouble, as had happened in 1943. However, because of the serious famine in late 1948 and 1949, eviction notices were suspended until 1950. By September 1950, the government had obtained enough land for the resettlement of those to be evicted, and the evictions proceeded, although they were resisted. The Governor of Nyasaland therefore set up a committee to review the 1928 ordinance and to suggest amendments. The committee proposed to end 5-yearly evictions and growing economic crops in lieu of rent, and to increase cash rents to an economic level, but with reductions for unmarried and other single women.

Tensions between estate owners and tenants continued in the 1940s and early 1950s. The two main issues in contention were evictions and the tenants’ wish to grow the produce of their choice and sell it in local markets, not through the estate owners. New legislation was introduced in 1952, and the tensions were lessened by government land purchases, mainly of former tobacco estates, after 1952. The number of Africans resident on the estates also declined sharply in this period, from about 173,000 individuals in 49,000 families in 1945 to 9,000 families in 1962. However, many of the remaining tenants were in the overcrowded Cholo district, the main area of tea estates, which required large numbers of estate workers. Here, grievances over thangata in 1953 led to major disturbances in which eleven people died. In 1962, shortly before independence the 1928 Ordinance was replaced by a 1962 Africans on Private Estates Ordinance that granted tenants security of tenure and abolished all forms of thangata requiring labour or the production of designated crops, replacing them with cash rents.

== See also ==
- British Central Africa Protectorate
- Nyasaland
- Thangata
