= List of rivers of Malawi =

This is a list of rivers in Malawi. This list is arranged by drainage basin, with respective tributaries indented under each larger stream's name.

== Indian Ocean ==
- Ruvuma River (Mozambique)
  - Lugenda River (Mozambique)
    - Luchimua River
    - Mandimbe River
      - Ngalamu River
- Zambezi River (Mozambique)
  - Shire River
    - Ruo River
      - Thuchila River
        - Luchenza River
    - Likabula River
    - Namkurumadzi River
    - Lisungwe River
    - Rivi Rivi River
      - Liwawadzi River
    - Masanje River
    - Lake Malawi
      - Bwanje River
      - Lilongwe River
        - Diampwe River
        - Likuni River
      - Bua River
      - Dwangwa River
      - Luweya River
      - South Rukuru River
        - Kasitu River
      - Rumpi River
      - North Rukuru River
      - Lufilya River
        - Mbalizi River
      - Songwe River

== Lake Chilwa ==
- Sombani River
- Phalombe River
