= Phoka, Malawi =

Town in Rumphi District, Northern Region, Malawi

- Location within Malawi
- Coordinates: 10°52′21″S 33°45′52″E
- Country: Malawi
- Region: Northern Region, Malawi
- District: Rumphi District
- Traditional Authority: T/A Phoka
- Established: 1948

Government
  - Type: Unitary presidential republic
  - Traditional Authority: Chief Phoka

Area
  - Total: 35.2 km^{2} (13.6 sq mi)

Population (2018)
  - Total: 24,560
  - Density: 698/km^{2} (1,810/sq mi)

Racial makeup (2018)
  - Black African: 91.1%
  - Asian: 2.1%
  - White: 3.8%

First languages (2018)
  - Tumbuka: 70.2%
  - Phoka: 18.5%
  - Henga/Hewe: 10.2%
  - Other: 1.1%
- Time zone: UTC+2 (CAT)

Phoka is a town located in the Rumphi District of the Northern Region of Malawi. It lies north of the town of Rumphi and forms part of the highland zone stretching towards the Nyika Plateau. The area is mainly inhabited by the Phoka and Tumbuka people and is known for its agricultural activities, hills and mountains.

== Geography ==
Phoka is situated in the northern highlands of Malawi at an elevation of approximately 1,300 metres (4,265 ft) above sea level. The landscape has hills, small valleys, and streams that flow towards the South Rukuru River. It experiences a temperate highland climate with cool temperatures and seasonal rainfall.

== History ==
The Phoka area traces its origins to precolonial times when the Tumbuka people settled in the region. During the British colonial period, Phoka was recognized as a traditional authority under the Native Authority system in the 1940s. The title “T/A Phoka” continues to be used by the local chiefdom today. The area was associated with early missionary expansion and the development of education and Christianity in northern Malawi.

== Economy ==
The local economy of Phoka is largely based on subsistence and small-scale farming. Major crops include maize, groundnuts, beans, potatoes, and tobacco. Coffee growing was also introduced in nearby highland areas due to favorable climatic conditions. Cattle and goat rearing are common among households. The area has growing interest in eco-tourism due to its proximity to the Nyika National Park.

== Education and infrastructure ==
Phoka has several primary and community day secondary schools under the Rumphi District Education Office. Access roads link the area to Rumphi Boma and surrounding trading centres.

== Culture ==
Phoka maintains traditional Tumbuka customs and ceremonies. Local dances such as Malipenga and Vimbuza remain active at social and cultural gatherings. The area also has church communities, mostly affiliated with the Church of Central Africa Presbyterian (CCAP).

== See also ==
- Rumphi District
- Northern Region, Malawi
- Phoka people
- Nyika National Park
