= List of protected areas of Malawi =

There are nine national parks and reserves in Malawi.

== National parks ==
- Kasungu National Park — situated approximately 165 km north of the capital city, Lilongwe, this is, at over 2,000 km^{2}, the second largest of Malawi's parks
- Lake Malawi National Park — designated a National Park in 1980 to protect the unique diversity of tropical fish living in Lake Malawi, some not found anywhere else on earth
- Lengwe National Park — most famed for the nyala antelope, not found in the other northern parks of Malawi
- Liwonde National Park — situated 120 km north of Blantyre, on the banks of the Upper Shire River
- Nyika National Park — the first (certified in 1965), the largest (over 3,000 km^{2}) and the highest (average height 1,800 m)

== Game and wildlife reserves ==
- Majete Wildlife Reserve — in the southwest of Malawi, with an area of 691 km^{2}
- Mwabvi Wildlife Reserve — the smallest of the parks, at 350 km^{2}, Mwabvi was adopted by Project African Wilderness in 2007 (PAW is a charitable organisation based in Malawi and the UK)
- Nkhotakota Wildlife Reserve — the oldest and largest established reserve in Malawi
- Vwaza Marsh Game Reserve — southwest of the Nyika Plateau, to the north of the South Rukuru River, Vwaza Marsh covers an area of 1,000 km^{2}

== Other protected areas ==
- Lake Chilwa - Ramsar wetland of international importance

== Forest reserves ==
Malawi has a system of forest reserves, the first of which were established over a century ago. Grazing and cultivation have encroached on many forest reserves, and many reserve forests have been replaced with exotic plantation trees including pine and eucalyptus.

=== Northern Region ===
- Bunganya Forest Reserve 34.7 km^{2} est. 1973
- Chikhang’ombe Forest Reserve 5921 ha. est. 2002
- Chisasira Forest Reserve 3447 ha. est. 1973
- Jembya Forest Reserve 13,764 ha. est. 1981
- Kalwe Forest Reserve 159 ha. est. 1956
- Kamphoyo Forest Reserve 635 ha.
- Kaning’ina Forest Reserve 14,007 ha. est. 1935
- Kawiya Forest Reserve 643.9 ha.
- Kuwirwe Forest Reserve 661.5 ha. est. 1935
- Litchenya Forest Reserve 316 ha. est. 1948
- Lunyangwa Forest Reserve 374 ha. est. 1935
- Mafinga Hills Forest Reserve 4734 ha. est. 1976
- Mahowe Forest Reserve 59.168 km^{2} est. 2002
- Matipa Forest Reserve 1055 ha. est. 1948
- Mkuwazi Forest Reserve 2020

ha. est. 1927

- Mtangatanga Forest Reserve 8099 ha. est. 1935
- Mughese Forest Reserve 771 ha. est. 1948
- Musisi Forest Reserve 7034 ha. est. 1948
- North Karonga Escarpment Forest Reserve 7907 ha. est. 2002
- Perekezi Forest Reserve 14,482 ha. est. 1935
- Ruvuo Forest Reserve 4792.9 ha. est. 1935
- South Karonga Escarpment Forest Reserve 13,050 ha. est. 2002
- South Viphya Forest Reserve (Chikangawa Forest Reserve) 157,728 ha. est. 1958
- Uzumara Forest Reserve 754 ha. est. 1948
- Vinthukutu Forest Reserve 1957 ha. est. 1948
- Wilindi Forest Reserve 937 ha. est. 1948

=== Central Region ===
- Bunda Forest Reserve 426 ha, est. 1948
- Chimaliro Forest Reserve 15,205 ha, est. 1926
- Chilobwe Forest Reserve 1314 ha, est. 1960
- Chongoni Forest Reserve 12,353 ha, est. 1924
- Dedza Mountain Forest Reserve 2917 ha, est. 1926
- Dedza-Salima Escarpment Forest Reserve 30,965 ha, est. 1974
- Dowa Hills Forest Reserve 3142 ha, est. 1974
- Dwambazi Forest Reserve, 7886.27 km^{2}
- Dzalanyama Forest Reserve 98,827 ha, est. 1922
- Dzenza Forest Reserve 779 ha, est. 1948
- Dzonzi Forest Reserve 4494 ha, est. 1924
- Kongwe Forest Reserve 1948 ha, est. 1926
- Mchinji Forest Reserve 20,885 ha, est. 1924
- Msitowalengwe Forest Reserve 98 ha, est. 1974
- Mua-Livulezi Forest Reserve 12,673 ha, est. 1924
- Mua-Tsanya Forest Reserve 933 ha, est. 1924
- Mvai Forest Reserve 4140 ha, est. 1924
- Ngala Forest Reserve 2272 ha, est. 1958
- North Senga Forest Reserve 1207 ha, est. 1958
- Ntchisi Mountain Forest Reserve 8758 ha, est. 1924
- South Senga Forest Reserve 532 ha, est. 1958
- Thuma Forest Reserve 15,767 ha, est. 1956

=== Southern Region ===
- Amalika Forest Reserve 370 ha, est. 1959
- Chigumula Forest Reserve 525 ha, est. 1925
- Chiradzulu Forest Reserve 774 ha, est. 1924
- Kalulu Hills Forest Reserve 2892 ha, est. 1958
- Liwonde Forest Reserve 27,407 ha, est. 1924
- Malabvi Forest Reserve 300 ha, est. 1927
- Mangochi Forest Reserve 40,853 ha, est. 1924
- Mangochi Palm Forest Reserve 501 ha, est. 1980
- Masambanjati Forest Reserve 93 ha, est. 1974
- Masenjere Forest Reserve 276 ha, est. 1930
- Mulanje Mountain Forest Reserve (Milange-Michesi) 56,314 ha, est. 1927
- Michiru Forest Reserve 3004 ha, est. 1970
- Milare Forest Reserve 59 ha, est. 1949
- Mudi Forest Reserve 39 ha, est. 1922
- Namizimu Forest Reserve 88,966 ha, est. 1924
- Ndirande Forest Reserve 1433 ha, est. 1922
- Soche Forest Reserve 388 ha, est. 1922
- Thambani Forest Reserve 4680 ha, est. 1927
- Thuchila Forest Reserve 1843 ha, est. 1925
- Thyolo Mountain Forest Reserve 1347 ha, est. 1924
- Matandwe Forest Reserve 31,053 ha, est. 1931
- Tsamba Forest Reserve 32.37 km^{2}, est. 1928
- Thyolomwani Forest Reserve 965 ha, est. 1930
- Zomba-Malosa Forest Reserve 19,018 ha, est. 1913
