= Henga people =

Ethnic tribe of Malawi and Zambia

The Henga people are Chitumbuka-speaking Bantu ethnic group who are related to and are part of the Tumbuka people, primarily found in Northern Malawi in districts of Rumphi and Karonga, Eastern Zambia, and Southern Tanzania.

== History ==
The Henga share a common origin with the Tumbuka, tracing their roots to the geographic region between the Dwangwa River to the south, the North Rukuru River to the north, Lake Malawi to the east, and the Luangwa River.
