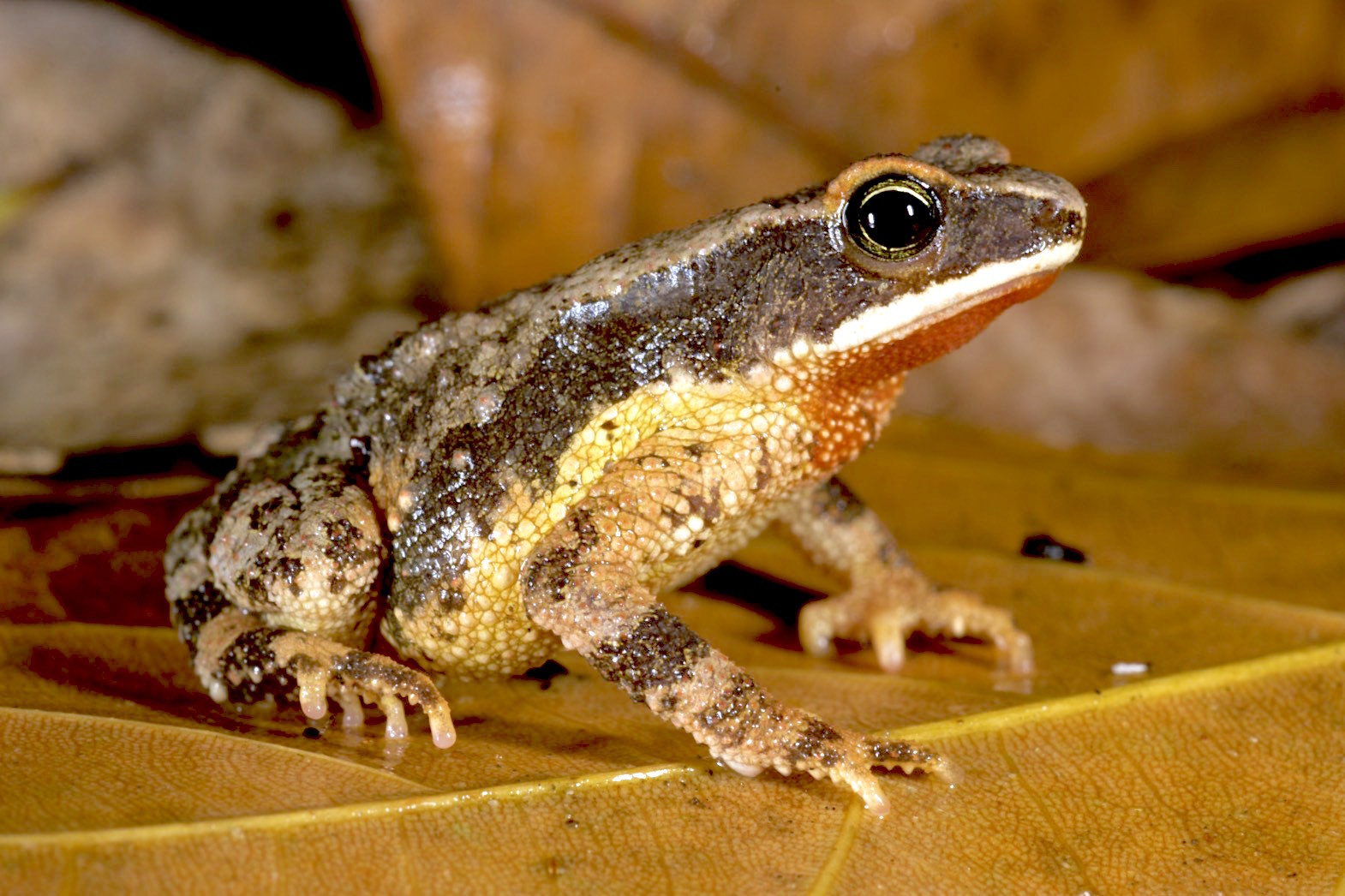
- Mertensophryne usambarae in Tanga, Tanzania

Conservation status
- Critically Endangered (IUCN 3.1)

Scientific classification
- Kingdom: Animalia
- Phylum: Chordata
- Class: Amphibia
- Order: Anura
- Family: Bufonidae
- Genus: Mertensophryne
- Species: M. usambarae

Binomial name
- Mertensophryne usambarae (Poynton and Clarke, 1999)

Synonyms
- Stephopaedes usambarae Poynton and Clarke, 1999

= Mertensophryne usambarae =

Species of amphibian

Mertensophryne usambarae (common name: Usambara forest toad) is a critically endangered species of toad in the family Bufonidae. It is endemic to the foothills of the East Usambara Mountains, northeastern Tanzania.

== Description ==
Males measure up to 35 mm (1.4 in) and females up to 45 mm (1.8 in) in snout–vent length. The dorsum is brown with some weak marking; the ventral surface is immaculate or with some mottling. The parotoid glands are flattened. There is no tympanum. The legs are relatively short and densely covered with conical warts.

== Habitat and conservation ==
Mertensophryne usambarae is a terrestrial species that inhabits lowland forests not higher than 410 m (1,350 ft) above sea level. It can also persist in mildly disturbed, selectively logged forests. Its breeding biology is unknown, but some other Mertensophryne species breed in puddles among tree roots (e.g., Mertensophryne anotis), and this could apply to this species too. Mertensophryne usambarae is ecologically similar to Mertensophryne micranotis, and these two species can co-occur.

The species is only known from three sites that are close to each other. It appears to be uncommon; i.e., three days of intensive survey effort in 2012 only revealed two specimens. It is threatened by habitat loss caused by agricultural encroachment, wood extraction, and human settlement. The known sites are all forest reserves (Kwamgumi, Segoma and Mtai Forest Reserves), but they are not well protected. Because of the very small range and threats to the habitat, the International Union for Conservation of Nature (IUCN) assessed this species as "Critically Endangered" in 2016.
