= North Rukuru River =

River in Malawi

Coordinates: 9°54′S 33°56′E

The North Rukuru River is a river of northern Malawi.

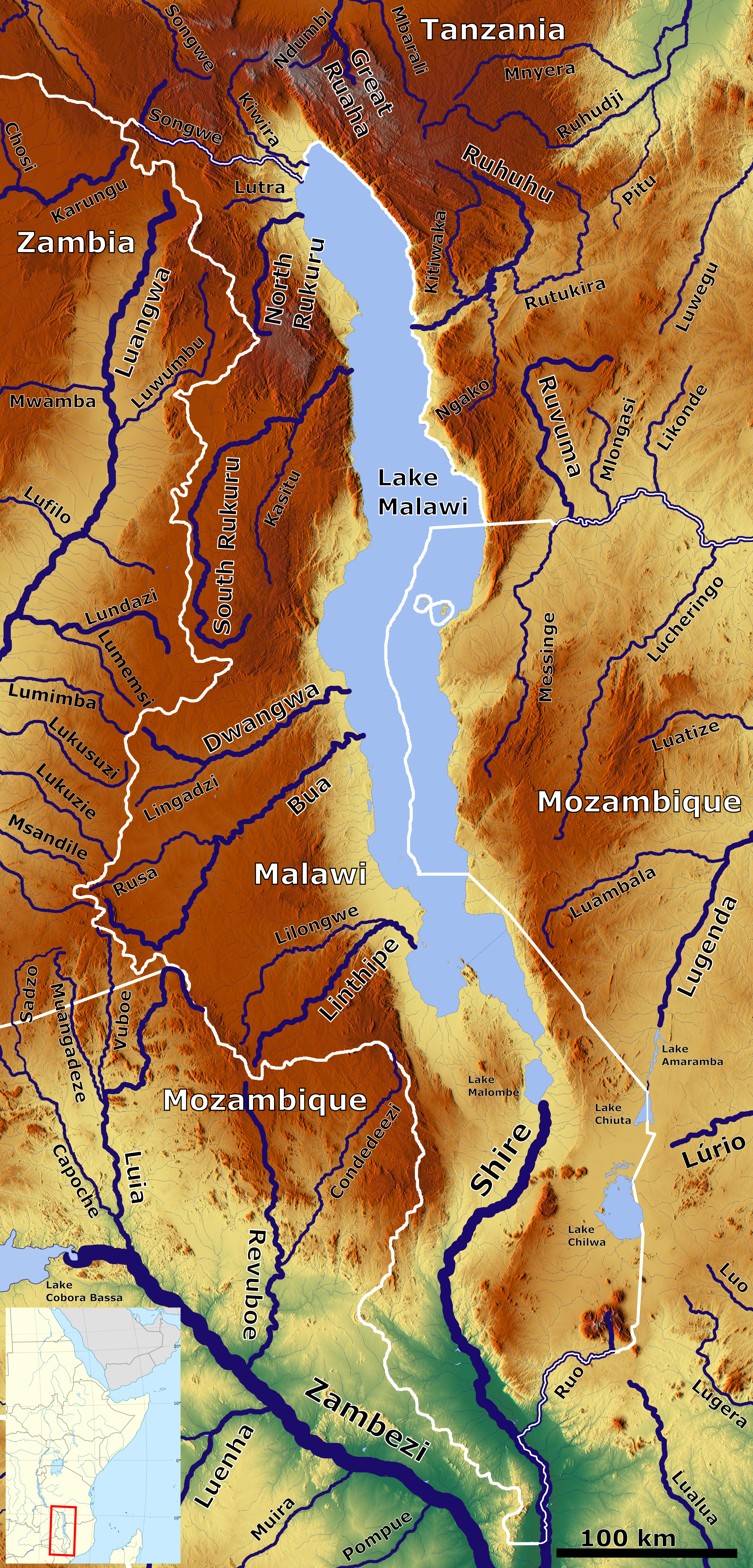
North Rukuru River (top left)

It rises in the Nyika Plateau and after about 100 km flows into Lake Malawi near Karonga. The river carries water all year round. The river drains one of Malawi's main rainfall areas, with an average of 1140 mm of rain per year.

== Tourism and business ==
A uranium deposit is located at Kayelekera in the Northern Rukuru Basin, a Karoo relict basin, estimated to contain approximately 11,500 tons of uranium and was open-pit mined from 2009 to 2014.

The Bua, Dangwa, Lilongwe, Lufilya, North Rukuru, Songwe, South Rukuru rivers together have a fishing potential of 15,000 tonnes annually, according to the FAO. Between 4,000 and 17,000 tons are caught.
