= Kandewe Heritage Centre =

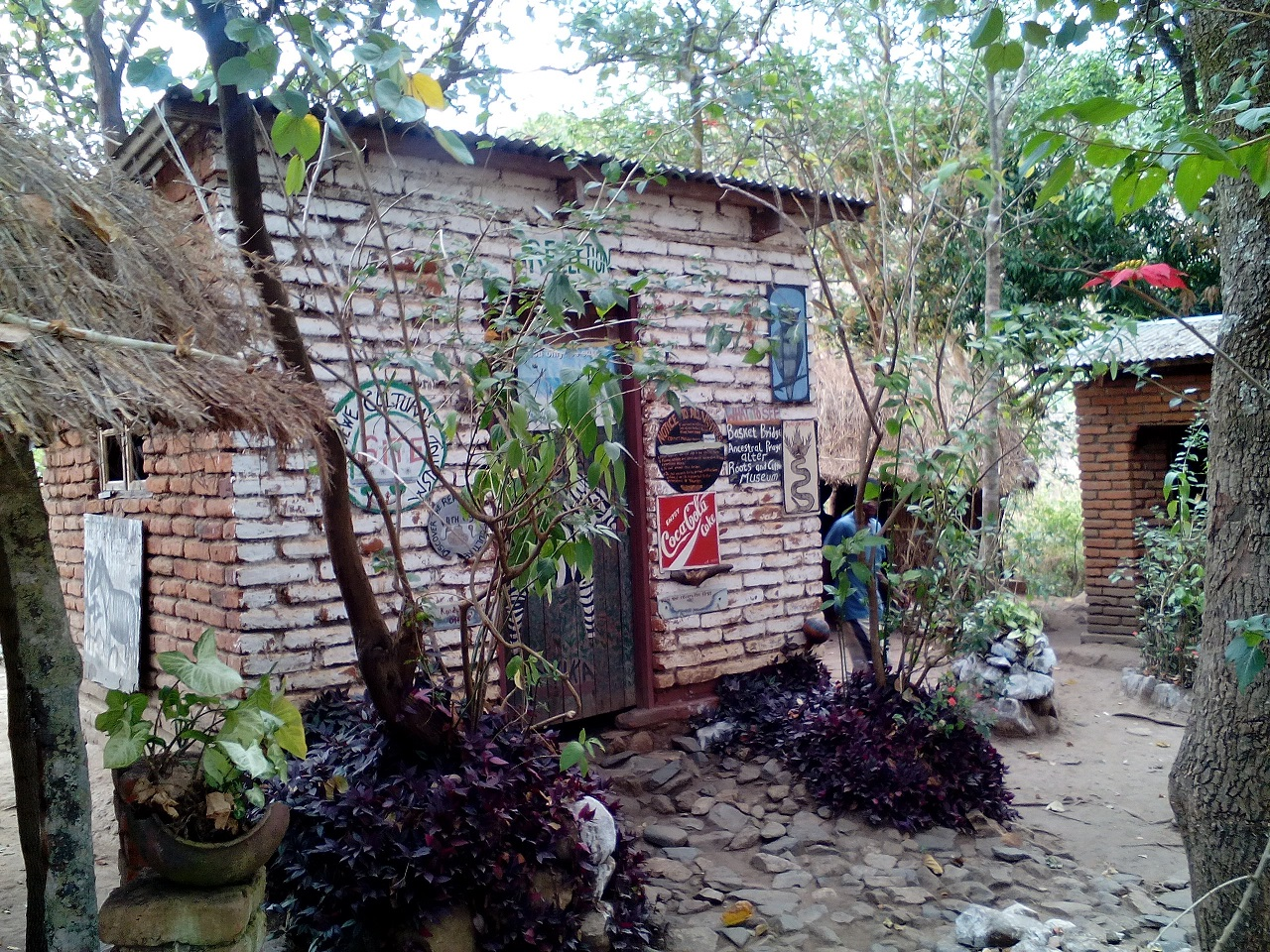
Kandewe Heritage Centre's museum

Kandewe Heritage Centre is a participatory project at Bela village, in Traditional Area Mwankhunikira in Rumphi district, northern Malawi. Founded in 2005 by Abel Nyasulu, it promotes the heritage of the Phoka people of Rumphi. In its small museum, the project displays Phoka religious activities, beliefs, dances, foods and economic activities such as fishing and hunting. Traditional dances which are sometimes performed by the surrounding community include Vimbuza, Mbotosya, Visekese, Ulimba, Ngwanya chiteke, and Chitata.

The project also highlights other local natural attractions including the Wongwe Falls located on the South Rukuru River, One of the major rivers in northern Malawi.

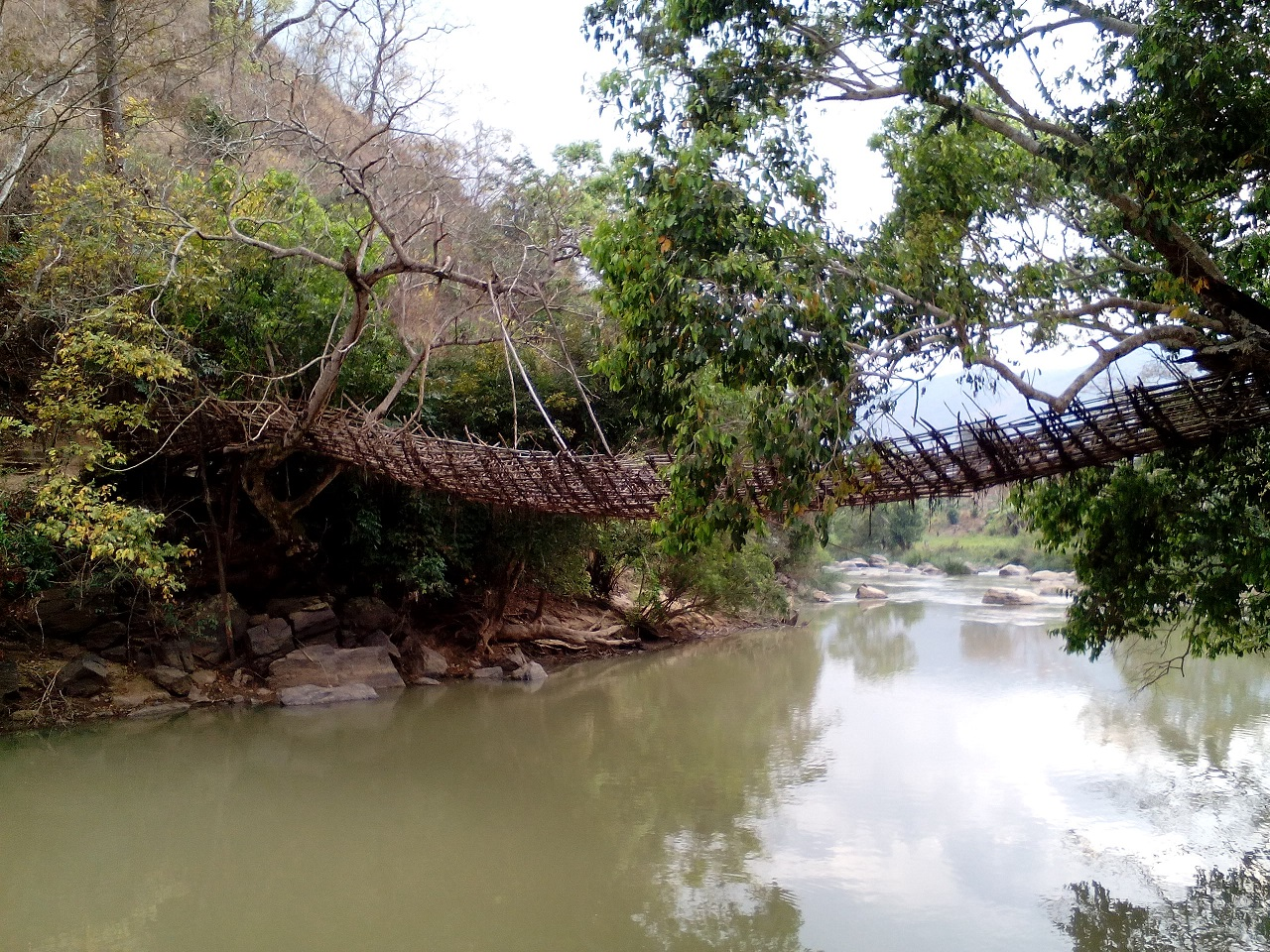
Basket Bridge over South Rukuru River, Rumphi, northern Malawi

The Centre also gives guided tours of the traditional Basket Bridge. Made from bamboo, it crosses the South Rukuru river. The original bridge is believed to have been built in 1904.
