= Bua River, Malawi =

River in Malawi

Coordinates: 13°39′S 32°51′E

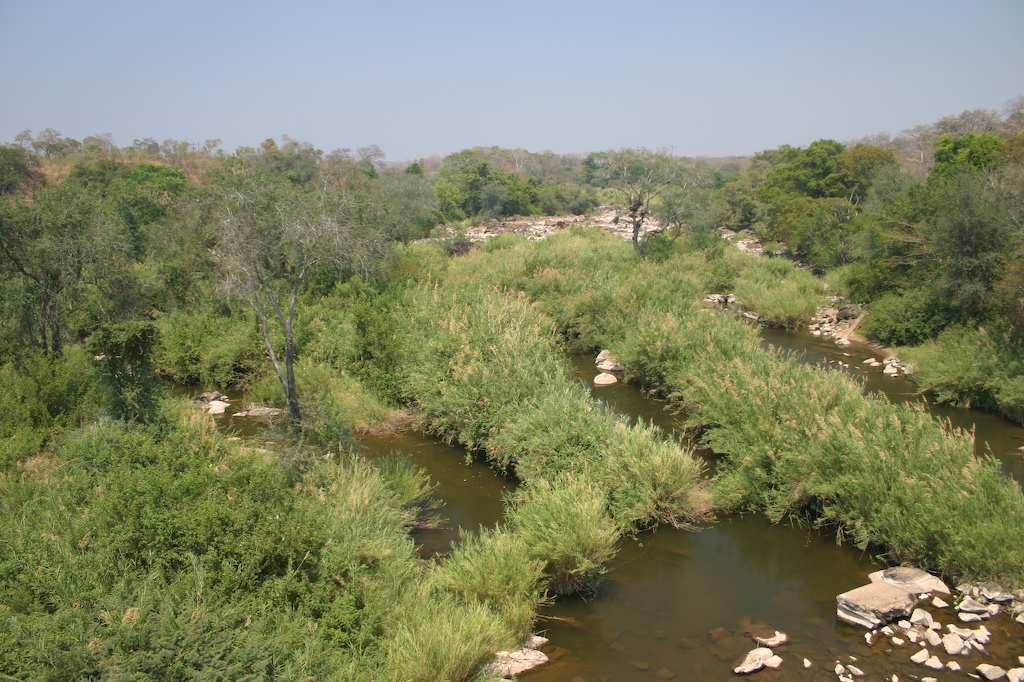

The Bua River is a major Malawian river which flows from the Dedza Highlands south before turning to eventually running parallel to the Dwangwa River as they both empty into Lake Malawi. The river provides water for irrigation and a diverse ecosystem. The Bua River flows through the Nkhotakota Wildlife Reserve.

== Course ==
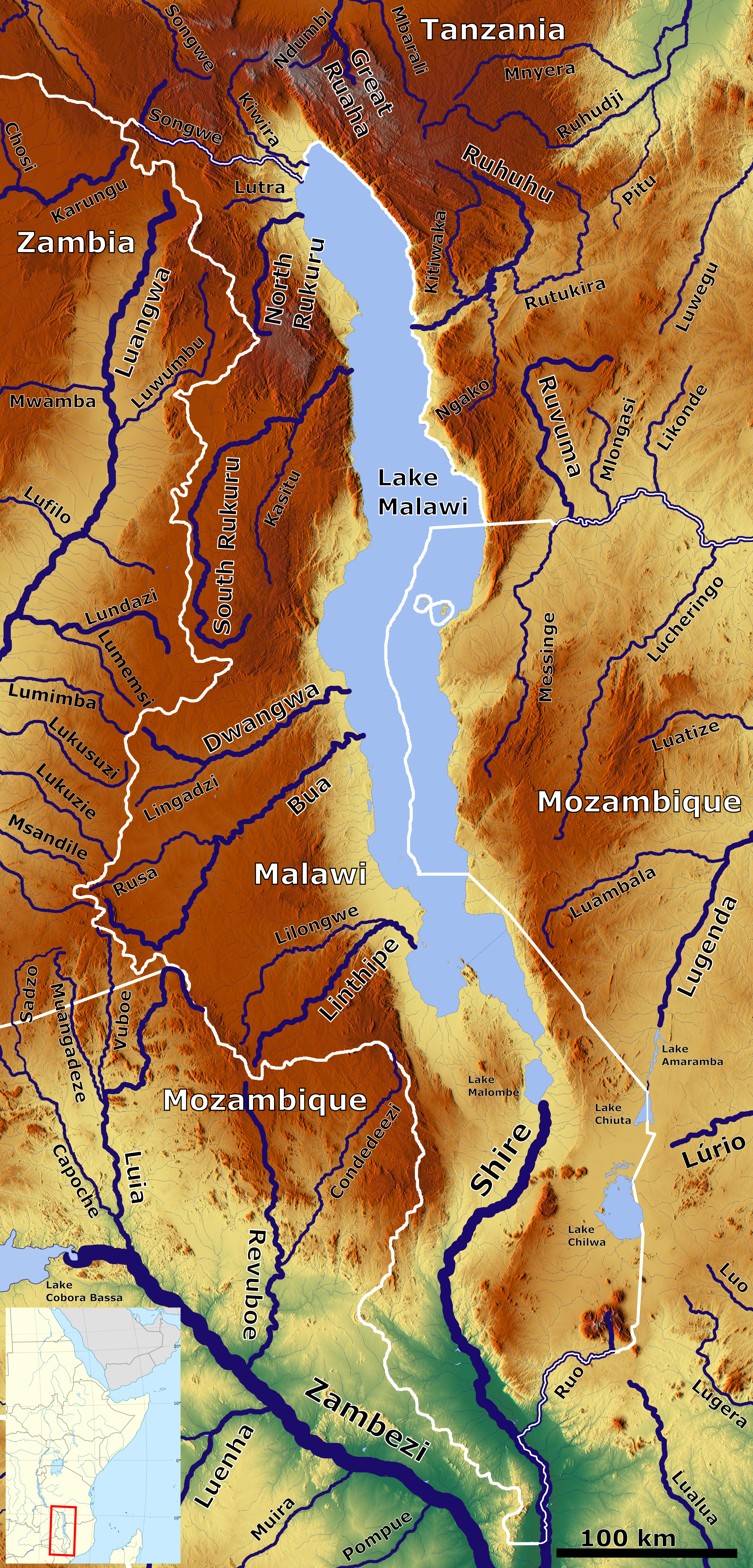
Bua River (centre left)

The river rises about 80 kilometers west of Lilongwe on the border with Zambia in the Mchinji Forest Reserve. It first flows about 40 kilometers to the southeast, then over 100 kilometers to the north-northeast and another 120 kilometers to the northeast almost parallel to the south of the Dwangwa River. It crosses the Nkhotakota Wildlife Reserve to flow into Lake Malawi at Bua Point, 17 kilometers north of Nkhotakota.

== Business ==
The Bua, Dwangwa, Lilongwe, Lufilya, North Rukuru, Songwe, South Rukuru rivers altogether have a fishing potential of 15,000 tonnes annually, according to the FAO. Between 4,000 and 17,000 tons are caught.

== Tourism ==
The Bua has some impressive waterfalls and is popular among anglers for the Mpasa fish, a type of salmon.
