= Rumphi District =

District of Malawi

Coordinates: 10°45′S 33°50′E

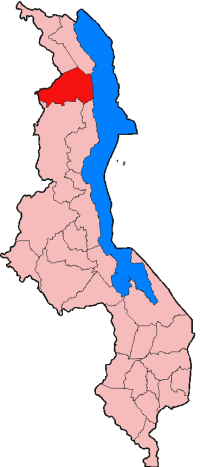
Location of Rumphi District in Malawi

Rumphi is a district in the Northern Region of Malawi. The capital is Rumphi. The district covers an area of 4,769 km.² and has a population of 128,360. Chitumbuka is the major and predominant language spoken in the district. The major ethnic group is the Tumbuka people, followed by its sub-group, the Phoka people.

== Geography ==
Rumphi District extends from Lake Malawi in the east to the Zambian border in the west. The northern end of the Mzimba Plain extends into the eastern portion of the district. Most of the district is drained by the South Rukuru River and its tributaries. The Viphya Mountains extend into the southeastern portion of the district, and much of central portion of the district lies on the Nyika Plateau.

Vwaza Marsh Wildlife Reserve covers the western end of the district, and Nyika National Park covers much of the center.

Rumphi is the district capital. Other towns include Chilumba, Chitango, Chiweta, Phoka and Livingstonia.

== Demographics ==
At the time of the 2018 Census of Malawi, the distribution of the population of Rumphi District by ethnic group was as follows:

- 96.2% Tumbuka
- 2.0% Chewa
- 1.2% Ngoni
- 0.8% Nkhonde
- 0.8% Tonga
- 0.8% Lambya
- 0.5% Lomwe
- 0.9% Yao
- 0.3% Sukwa
- 0.1% Mang'anja
- 0.1% Sena
- 0.1% Nyanja
- 0.5% Others

== Government and administrative divisions ==
There are three National Assembly constituencies in Rumphi:

- Rumphi - East
- Rumphi - North
- Rumphi - West

Since the 2009 election all of these constituencies have been held by members of an independent party.

== Notable people ==
Notable residents include:

- Temwa Chaŵinga and Tabitha Chaŵinga was born here in 1998. She and her twin sister play for the Malawian national football team.
- Edgar Chibaka, founder and managing editor of the Nyasa Times, one of Malawi's top online and print newspapers
- Chakufwa Chihana 'the father of Malawian Democracy', founder of AFORD
- Moses Chirambo, ophthalmologist, entrepreneur, and politician
- Queen Gondwe, was the MP for Rumphi Central who became a cabinet Minister
- Kamlepo Kalua, president of an opposition party
- Mwiza Munthali, talk show host and activist
- Dindi Gowa Nyasulu, Malawian engineer and former president of AFORD
- Kenneth Thindwa, pharmacist, entrepreneur and politician
- Robert Ng'ambi, soccer player
- Gertrude Rubadiri teacher and independence activist
- Rachel NyaGondwe Fiedler a theologian, academic and community worker
