= Rumphi Central Constituency =

- First-past-the-post constituency for the Parliament of Malawi
- District: Rumphi
- Region: Northern Region

Current constituency
- Party: United Transformation Movement
- Member: Mathews Mtumbuka (from 2026)

Rumphi Central Constituency in Rumphi District in Malawi's Northern Region. It is one of the three constituencies in Rumphi District. It elects one Member of Parliament by the first past the post system.

== History ==
Moses Chirambo was elected by the voters in the Rumphi Central Constituency in 2009. Chirambo died in 2010.

In 2019, Enock Chakufwa Chihana was standing again for election having completed two terms. He was criticised for absences in South Africa where he was working for Shepherd Bushiri. Parliamentary debates saw him being booed before calmer discussions. Independent candidate Macdowel Chidumba Mkandawire won the seat and then agreed to join the DPP in time to meet Minister of Transport and Public Works Ralph Jooma who visited to open a new bridge.

In 2025, Enock Chakufwa Chihana was elected but he was promoted to second vice President. In the by-election that followed Dr. Mathews Mtumbuka of the United Transformation Movement was elected.
