= Dindi Gowa Nyasulu =

Malawian politician (1944–2012)

Dindi Gowa Nyasulu (August 3, 1944 – December 11, 2012) was an engineer, a Malawian politician and former head of AFORD, Malawi's fifth largest political party. He was born in Luwuchi village in Rumphi to Amos Gowa Nyasulu and Mary Ana Nyaukandawire. He died on December 11, 2012, in South Africa. At the time of his death, his name was associated to the design of many major roads and bridges in the Republic of Malawi.

== Career ==
After receiving his masters, he worked as a civil servant at Ministry of works where he rose to the title of Controller of lands valuation and water. He was retired early on political grounds after which he went to South Africa and worked for the Council for Scientific and Industrial Research of Southern Africa as the technical manager. During his tenure at CSIR he scooped two prestigious awards. One for Technological excellency and the other for Marketing excellency. He began his political career as an executive member of AFORD by joining a South African wing of AFORD. He then became Member of Parliament for Rumphi East. By 1999 he had returned to Malawi working as chair of the Public Works Committee of Parliament in Malawi whilst working as a national campaign director for AFORD. He also headed the Mphizi Engineering Consulting Firm. He worked as the Chairperson of Electrical Supply Commission.

He became the President of Aford in the House in 2003. During his leadership as an Aford president Dindi practically financed the party from his pocket, a gesture of love and dedication to the nation and an attribute which Khwauli Msiska the secretary general of Aford acknowledged. He resigned from his position as President of AFORD in 2012, prior to his death. He was succeeded by Godfrey Shawa.

== Personal ==
He was born in Luwuchi in Rumphi district to a family of nine. His parents named him Dindi which means grave as they lost many children at infancy. Little did they know this was just the beginning of this remarkable man. A son of a fisherman, who through sheer determination and fighting spirit found himself in the shores of America at University of Washington where he obtained his Civil Engineering degree (Cum Laude). He later went and obtained his master's degree at university of Birmingham. His name is associated with many designs and construction of many roads in Malawi. He started formal education at Chiweta Primary School. He then attended Livingstonia Secondary School but later transferred to Dedza Secondary School, and then Blantyre Secondary School. He was married to Idabel Nyasopera Mwafulirwa and had five children. Tafiska Nyasulu an Investor and business analyst who is doing a doctorate in Economics, Yavuska Nyasulu Okie a chemist, Dr Chizgani Nyasulu Egbunike a paediatrician, Kamphinda Nyasulu an Entrepreneur who has now taken over the running of Mphizi consulting engineers and Dr Yanila Nyasulu who is specialising in internal medicine. He also had five grand children. Fumilayo, Phokwa, Zangi, Olu Segun and Zikora. Dindi Gowa Nyasulu believed in education. During his lifetime he educated many people. Giving was his second nature. He used to tell his children that, it was through people's giving spirit that I came this far'. He believed in himself and used to say 'Bakababa Bakawilinganya' meaning "when my parents gave birth to me they did a perfect job. A man who loved to dance and at the end of his life told his children. I feel favoured by God to have had you as my friends for I know this is not the end of my story but the beginning of a tale of the extraordinary man in me, love each other."

Dindi Gowa Nyasulu was spiritual and passed those teachings down to his children. At the time of his death he was a church elder, a 'Madodana' in the Livingstonia synod of CCAP. The Livingstonia synod recounts Dindi for his great contribution to the church. It was noted that his favourite song in chitumbuka was 'Ine umoya wane ndi yesu' which means 'My life belongs to Jesus'. As he was mourned, one of his daughters cried out 'job well done my father'. He was buried at a private grave in his home village of Luwuchi.
