= Gloria Msindira =

African model (born 1994)

- Born: Gloria Msindira; 28 March 1994 (age 32); Blantyre, Malawi
- Occupation: Model
- Years active: 2010–present
- Modeling information
- Height: 5 ft 8 in (1.73 m)

Gloria Msindira (born 28 March 1994) is an African model. She was crowned Malawi News Model Of The Year in 2013.She was born in Rumphi.
