= Mertensophryne mocquardi =

Conservation status
- Data Deficient (IUCN 3.1)

Scientific classification
- Kingdom: Animalia
- Phylum: Chordata
- Class: Amphibia
- Order: Anura
- Family: Bufonidae
- Genus: Mertensophryne
- Species: M. mocquardi

Binomial name
- Mertensophryne mocquardi (Angel, 1924)

Synonyms
- Bufo mocquardi Angel, 1924

Species of amphibian

Mertensophryne mocquardi (common names: Mocquards [sic] toad, Mocquard's toad) is a species of toad in the family Bufonidae. It is endemic to Kenya and known from Mount Kenya, the Kinangop Plateau, and the highlands surrounding Nairobi. The specific name mocquardi refers to François Mocquard, a French herpetologist. It was put in synonymy of Mertensophryne lonnbergi in 1972, but re-validated in 1997.

== Description ==
Mertensophryne mocquardi is a relatively small-sized toad. The tympanum is hidden. The canthus rostralis is angular. No bone ridges are present in the head. The parotoid glands are distinct but not always prominent; they are broad and well separated from the eyelids. The hind limbs are relatively short and have well-developed subarticular tubercles. The toes are about one-third webbed. Skin is granulate or tuberculate above and granulate below. The dorsal colouration varies from yellow to black. A light vertebral stripe is often present.

== Habitat and conservation ==
Owing to confusing with Mertensophryne lonnbergi and Mertensophryne nairobiensis, the ecology of this species is poorly known. It is assumed to be a montane forest species. The type series was collected at elevations of 2,400–2,600 m (7,900–8,500 ft) above sea level. Threats to it are not known. It might be present in the Mount Kenya and Aberdares National Parks.
