= Rumphi =

Town in Northern Malawi

Coordinates: 11°01′S 33°52′E

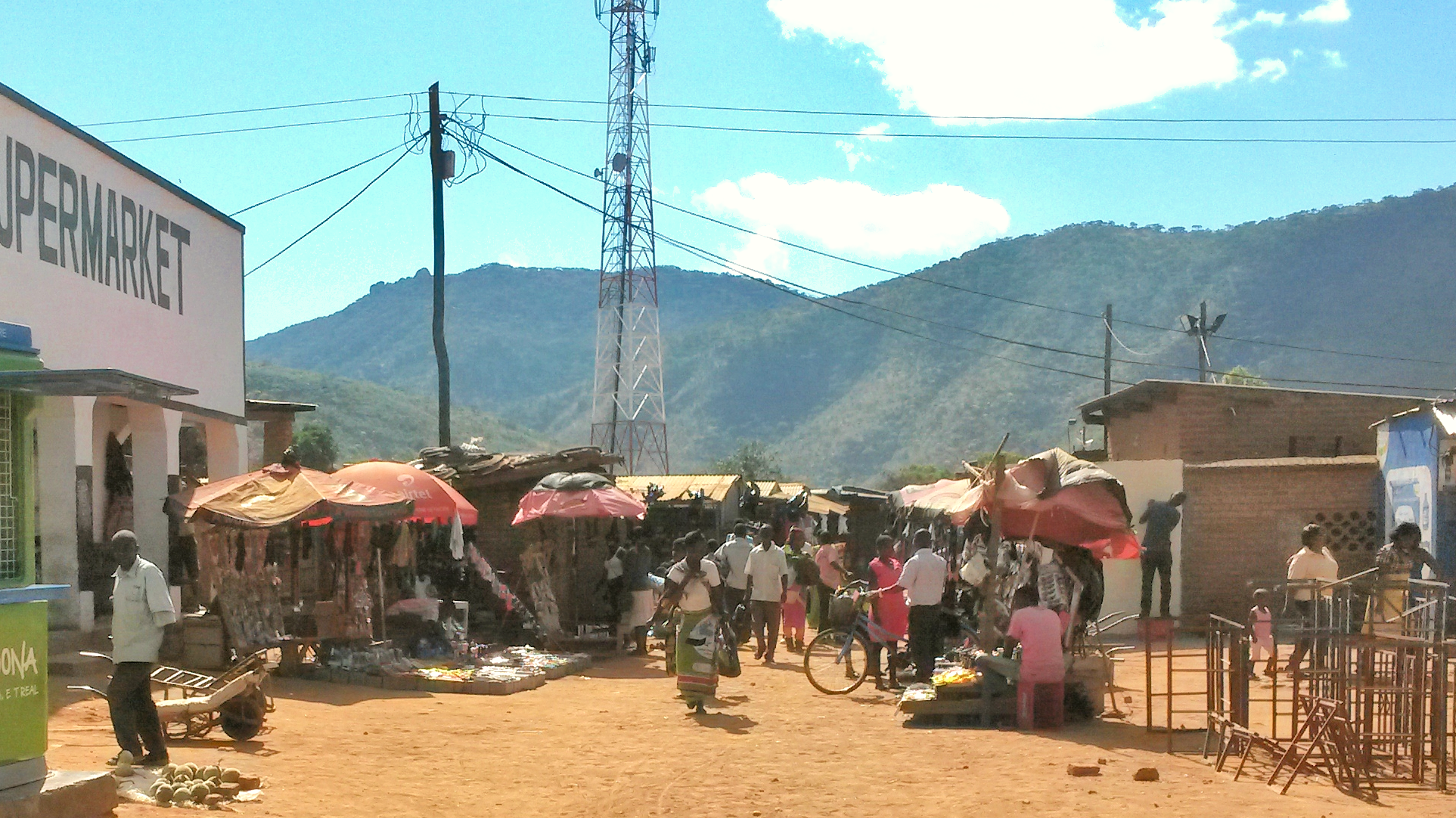
- Rumphi City Market
- Interactive map of Rumphi
- Region: Northern Region
- District: Rumphi District

Rumphi is the capital of the Rumphi District (Rumphi Boma) in the Northern Region of Malawi. It is a market town which serves the widespread farming community.

== Description ==
Rumphi is on the way to Nyika National Park, Nyika Plateau, and Vwaza Marsh Game Reserve. Unlike its larger neighbour, Mzuzu, which has mild sunny weather almost all year, Rumphi has a differing climate. The town, being surrounded by hills, always has a nice wind. The town is bounded by the Rumphi river in the east and the South Rukuru River in the south.

Rumphi has a cattle market every Saturday morning at 6:00 a.m. where farmers and dealers are coming to sell and buy cattle. It is the biggest cattle market between Lilongwe, Karonga, and Mzimba. Along the road to Bolero, opposite the FDH Bank is Roscher Youth Development Centre. On the centre's plot, to the south of the Rukuru River, the Support Malawi e.V. foundation initiated the first Earthbag House Lodge in Rumphi. It was built by the youth with walls of stacked sand bags. An Earthbag Restaurant became attractive for visitors as well as residents of the lodges.

The St Patrick's Minor Seminary is in Rumphi. In 2018 the seminary was mentioned in the UK parliament. The seminary had a partnership with St Benedict's High School in Scotland and three days before a planned visit they were told that their applications for visas were rejected. The visas were restored after the Scotland Malawi Partnership contacted members of parliament. The recovery was impressive, but the responsible department did not want to discuss how it could have been avoided.

Around Rumphi are tobacco fields and fields of maize, groundnuts, cassava and potatoes.

== Government ==
Rumphi Central constituency is the lead constituency. In 2025 Enock Chakufwa Chihana was elected but he was promoted to second vice President. In the bi-election that followed Dr. Mathews Mtumbuka of the United Transformation Movement was elected.

== Demographics ==
Year	Population
1977	3,998
1987	7,156
1998	14,069
2008	17,845
2018	22,358

== Gallery ==
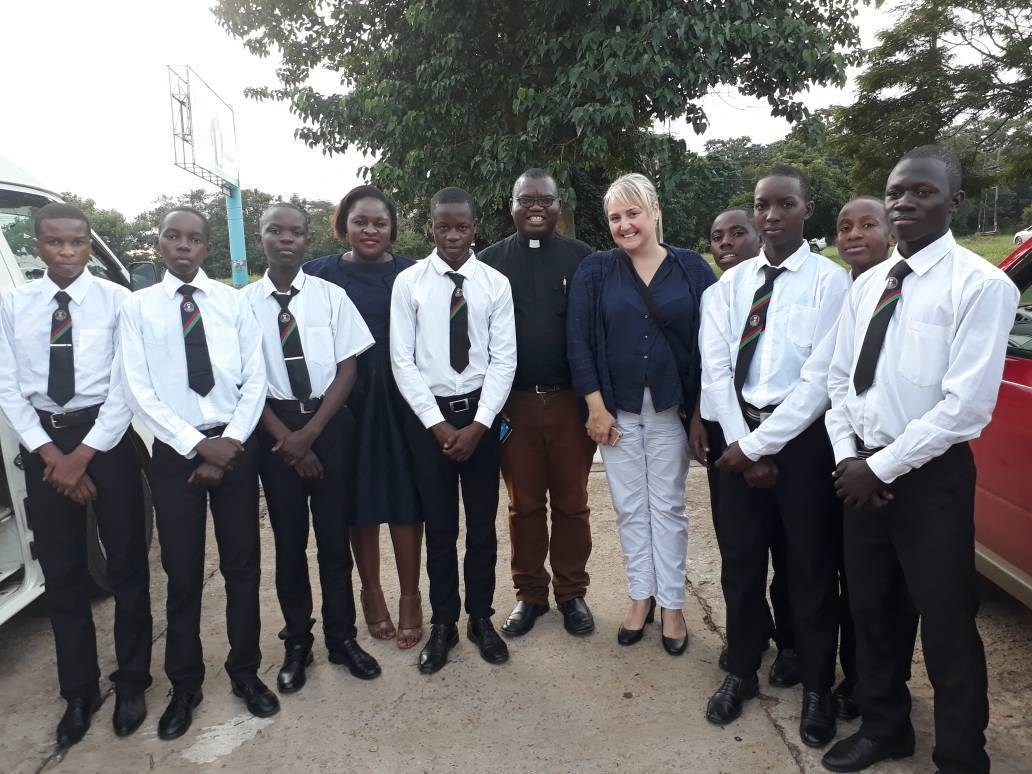
Pupils and teachers from St Patrick's Minor Seminary

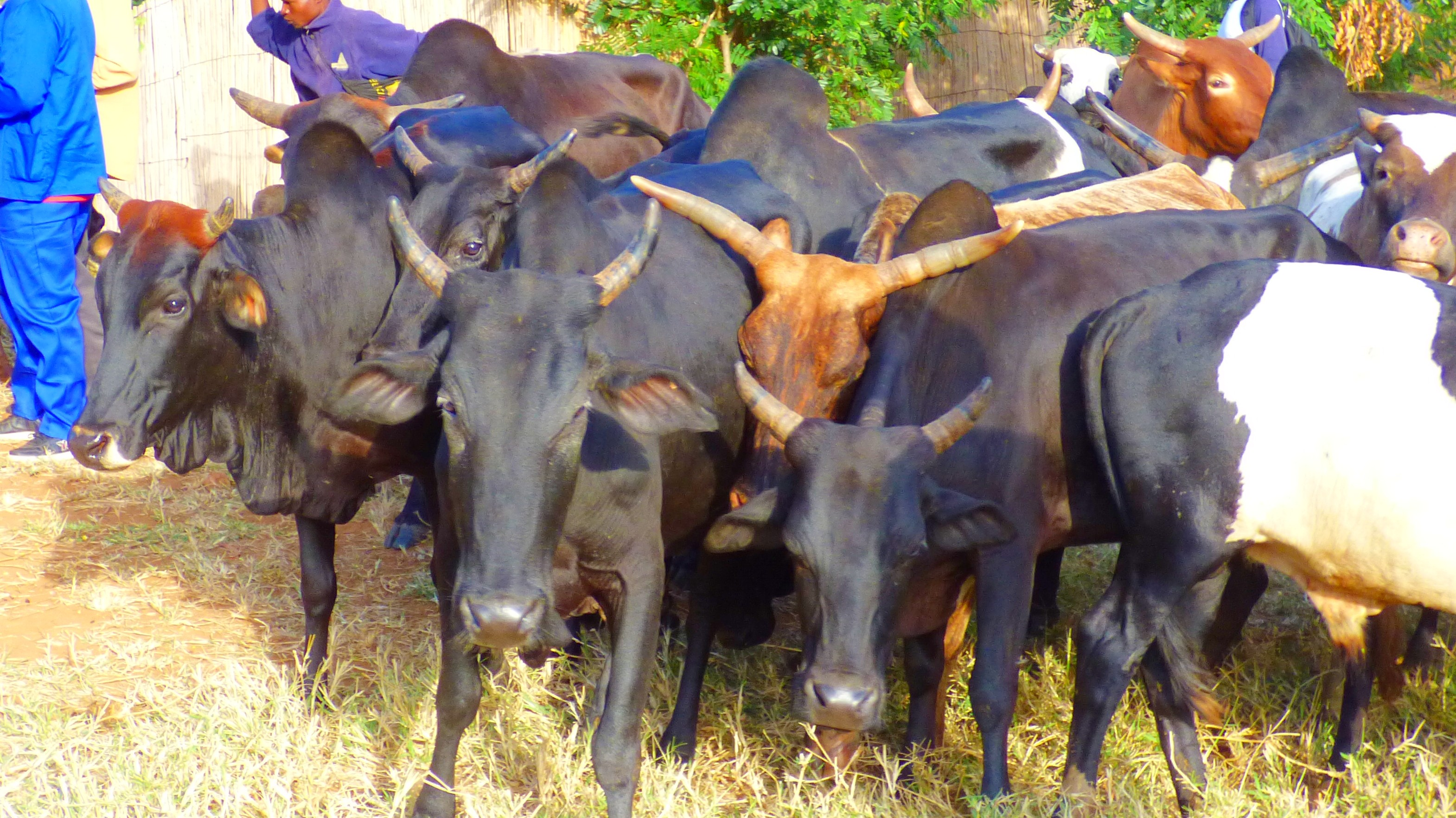
Weekly cattle market in Rumphi

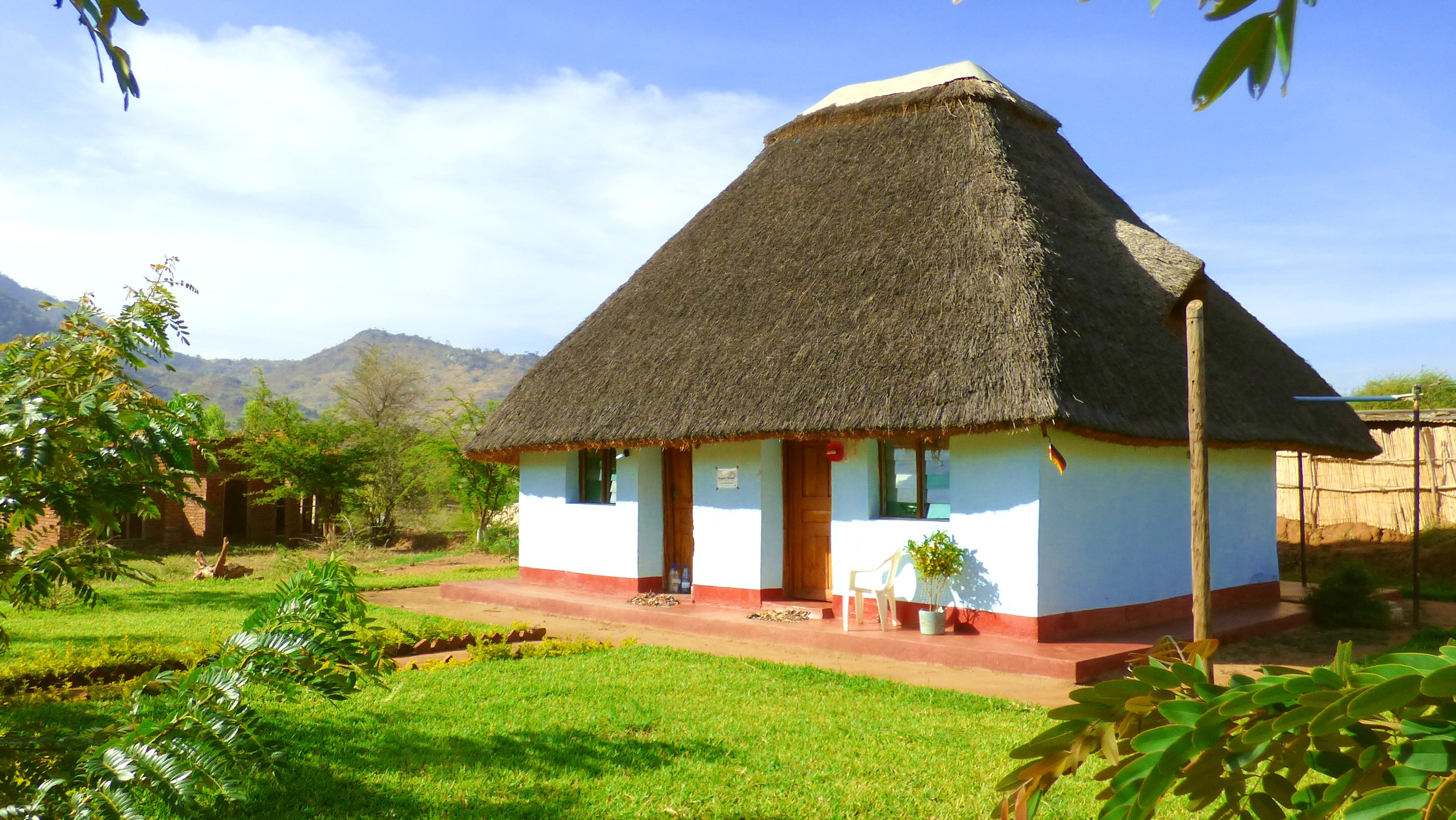
First earthbag house in Rumphi district at Roscher Youth Development Centre
