= Enoch Chihana =

Second Vice President of Malawi and leader of the Alliance for Democracy (AFORD)

Right Honourable Enoch Kamzingeni Chihana

Second Vice President of Malawi
- Incumbent
- Assumed office 5 October 2025
- President: Peter Mutharika
- Preceded by: Chakufwa Chihana

President of the Alliance for Democracy
- Incumbent
- Assumed office 9 September 2013
- Preceded by: Godfrey Shawa

Member of Parliament for Rumphi Central
- Incumbent
- Assumed office 2012
- Constituency: Rumphi Central

Personal details
- Born: Enoch Kanzingeni Chihana Rumphi District, Northern Region, Malawi
- Party: AFORD
- Parent: Chakufwa Chihana (father)
- Education: University of Malawi
- Occupation: Politician
- Profession: Businessman

Enoch Kamzingeni Chihana is a Malawian politician and businessman who serves as the Second Vice President of Malawi. He is also the President of the Alliance for Democracy (AFORD), and a long-serving Member of Parliament for Rumphi Central Constituency. He is the son of Chakufwa Chihana, the founder of Malawi's multiparty system and democracy, and the founding leader of AFORD.

== Early life and background ==
Chihana was born in Rumphi District in northern Malawi. He is the son of Chakufwa Chihana, the veteran pro-democracy activist who led Malawi’s transition to multiparty politics in the early 1990s.

== Political career ==
=== Alliance for Democracy (AFORD) leadership ===
Following the death of his father, Chihana took a role in rebuilding AFORD. In September 2013, he was elected as the party’s President, succeeding Godfrey Shawa.

Under his leadership, AFORD sought to restore its former influence in northern Malawi and remake itself as a national political force. Chihana has maintained ties with traditional leaders in the region, including Paramount Chief Chikulamayembe, as part of AFORD’s revitalization strategy.

=== Member of Parliament for Rumphi Central ===
Chihana entered parliament after winning the Rumphi Central seat in a by-election in 2012, following the death of Moses Chirambo. He has since retained the seat through successive elections, mostly fighting for youth empowerment, decentralization, and development in northern Malawi.

=== Ministerial positions ===
Between 2012 and 2014, Chihana served as Minister of Sports and Youth Development under President Joyce Banda. During his tenure, he promoted sports infrastructure development and reforms in youth programs.

=== Pan-African Parliament ===
In 2018, he was appointed Vice President of the Southern African Caucus of the Pan-African Parliament, representing the SADC region.

=== Appointment as Second Vice President ===
On 5 October 2025, President Peter Mutharika appointed Chihana as the Second Vice President of Malawi, following the reintroduction of the post as part of a government of national unity. The appointment was viewed as a move to strengthen ties with AFORD and promote national inclusion, especially in the northern region.

== Political positions ==
Chihana advocates for a federal system of government, arguing that decentralization will improve development equity among Malawi’s regions. He also supports multiparty cooperation and has called for opposition unity.

== Personal life ==
He is married and has children. He stays in Lilongwe.

== See also ==
- Second Vice President of Malawi
- Chakufwa Chihana
- Alliance for Democracy (Malawi)
