= Disa praecox =

Scientific classification
- Kingdom: Plantae
- Clade: Tracheophytes
- Clade: Angiosperms
- Clade: Monocots
- Order: Asparagales
- Family: Orchidaceae
- Subfamily: Orchidoideae
- Genus: Disa
- Species: D. praecox

Binomial name
- Disa praecox H.P.Linder

Synonyms
- Herschelia praecox H.P.Linder; Herschelianthe praecox (H.P.Linder) H.P.Linder

Species of flowering plant

Disa praecox is a perennial plant and geophyte belonging to the genus Disa. The plant is native to the Nyika Plateau in Malawi and Zambia.
