= Mwanda Peak =

Mountain in Zambia

- Location within Zambia

Highest point
- Elevation: 2,148 m (7,047 ft)
- Coordinates: 10°42′18″S 33°34′03″E

Geography
- Location: Zambia

Mwanda Peak is the highest topographical point in the border of Zambia. It is located near the border with Malawi in the thin northeastern arm of Eastern Province, and sits in the Nyika Plateau.
