= Godfrey Shawa =

Malawian politician

Godfrey Shawa is a Malawian politician and former interim president of the Alliance for Democracy (AFORD), succeeding Dindi Gowa Nyasulu in 2012.

Following the death of former party president and founder Chakufwa Chihana in 2006, Shawa was listed in Malawi's 2007 entry for the Africa Yearbook as the leader of one of the two party factions that emerged, the other faction leader being Chiphimpha Mughogho.

In 2013, interim president Shawa contested the formal party president position with Minister of Youth and Sports Enoch Chihana and former Economic Planning and Development Minister Khwauli Msiska. Chihana won the election and assumed the party presidency.

== See also ==
- Politics of Malawi
