= Mertensophryne uzunguensis =

Conservation status
- Vulnerable (IUCN 3.1)

Scientific classification
- Kingdom: Animalia
- Phylum: Chordata
- Class: Amphibia
- Order: Anura
- Family: Bufonidae
- Genus: Mertensophryne
- Species: M. uzunguensis

Binomial name
- Mertensophryne uzunguensis (Loveridge, 1932)

Synonyms
- Bufo taitanus uzunguensis Loveridge, 1932; Bufo uzunguensis Loveridge, 1932

Species of amphibian

Mertensophryne uzunguensis, also known as the Uzungwe toad, Udzungwa toad, and Udzungwa forest toad, is a species of toad in the family Bufonidae. It is endemic to Tanzania and found in the Udzungwa Mountains and the Southern Highlands. Its natural habitats are swampy montane grasslands. It is threatened by habitat loss caused by afforestation with pines, overgrazing, and agricultural expansion. Whether its range includes the Udzungwa Mountains National Park is unknown.
