= Mertensophryne howelli =

Conservation status
- Endangered (IUCN 3.1)

Scientific classification
- Kingdom: Animalia
- Phylum: Chordata
- Class: Amphibia
- Order: Anura
- Family: Bufonidae
- Genus: Mertensophryne
- Species: M. howelli

Binomial name
- Mertensophryne howelli (Poynton and Clarke, 1999)

Synonyms
- Stephopaedes howelli Poynton & Clarke, 1999

Species of amphibian

Mertensophryne howelli (common name: Mrora forest toad) is a species of toad in the family Bufonidae. It is endemic to the coast of Tanzania and known from the Mafia Island and Zanzibar. The species is named after professor Kim Howell for his contributions to the herpetology of Tanzania.

== Description ==
The holotype, an adult female, measured 44 mm (1.7 in) in snout to vent length and 41 mm (1.6 in) in snout to urostyle tip length. The male paratype measured 31 mm (1.2 in) in snout to urostyle tip length. The maximum reported female snout–vent length is 45 mm (1.8 in) and clutch size 60 eggs.

The top of the head is flat, as typical for species of the formerly recognized genus Stephopuedes. Parotoid glands are flattened and broad. Dorsal and lateral skin of head and parotoid region are densely covered with sharply pointed, light-tipped spines, which are especially densely packed on canthus and lateral edge of eyelids. Spines on loreal region are fewer and smaller. Colouration is generally dark brown, with a light upper lip and snout tip and a light middorsal line over the urostyle.

== Habitat and conservation ==
It is a terrestrial toad inhabiting lowland coastal forest, showing some degree of adaptability to living in degraded habitats. On Mafia Island, its habitat is being degraded rapidly for agriculture, wood extraction, and human settlements. It occurs in the Jozani Chwaka Bay National Park on Zanzibar.
