= Mertensophryne lindneri =

Conservation status
- Least Concern (IUCN 3.1)

Scientific classification
- Kingdom: Animalia
- Phylum: Chordata
- Class: Amphibia
- Order: Anura
- Family: Bufonidae
- Genus: Mertensophryne
- Species: M. lindneri

Binomial name
- Mertensophryne lindneri (Mertens, 1955)

Synonyms
- Bufo lindneri Mertens, 1955

Species of amphibian

Mertensophryne lindneri (common names: Dar es Salaam toad, Lindners toad, Lindners dwarf toad) is a species of toad in the family Bufonidae. It is found on the coastal lowlands of eastern Tanzania and northern Mozambique to southeastern Malawi, up to 650 m (2,130 ft) asl. Its habitats are woodlands, thickets, dry forests, farmland, and even rocky outcrops; it tolerates low-intensity cultivation. Its breeding habitat is unknown but presumably includes ponds or streams. It is considered uncommon but also difficult to observe, typically found after heavy rain. The intensification of agriculture and expanding human settlements are considered likely threats to it.
