= Vwaza Marsh Game Reserve =

National game reserve in Malawi

Coordinates: 11.0425°S 33.7753°E

Vwaza Marsh Wildlife Reserve
- IUCN category IV (habitat/species management area)
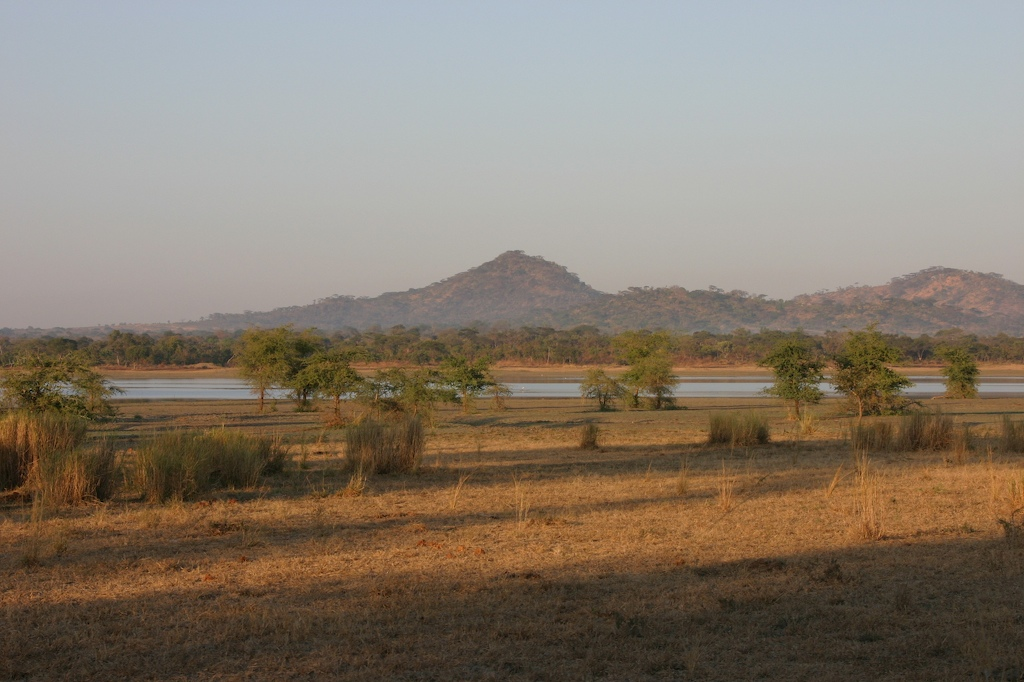
- Lake Kazuni, Vwaza Marsh Wildlife Reserve
- Interactive map of Vwaza Marsh Wildlife Reserve
- Location: Malawi
- Area: 1,000 km^{2} (390 sq mi)

Vwaza Marsh Wildlife Reserve is a national game reserve in Malawi.

In contrast to the Nyika National Park on the Nyika Plateau, much of Vwaza is located on low-lying flat ground although the eastern side of the park is hilly. It is located to the southeast of the plateau and to the north of the floodplains of South Rukuru River and covers an area of 1,000 km^{2}.

The park is characterised by Mopane and Miombo woodland and marshy wetlands which attract a significant number of birds to the reserve.

Vwaza Marsh Wildlife Reserve is rarely visited by many, largely due to poor road conditions and difficult terrain and inaccessibility.

The variation in animal number of species type may vary from season to season as they cross the border with the North Luangwa National Park in Zambia. Typically the reserve has large herds of Cape buffaloes and elephants, and a large variety of antelope including roan, greater kudu, Lichtenstein's hartebeest, eland and impala. Warthogs are also found in this reserve as well as numerous hippopotamus pod in Lake Kazuni. Camera trap surveys have also shown that lions are present, but probably transient, as well as leopards and wild dogs.

Moses the orphaned elephant that now is at Jumbo Foundation elephant orphanage in Lilongwe Malawi, was rescued by rangers at Vwaza marsh in the South Rukuru river.

Notable birdlife include Goliath herons, openbill storks and the rare white-winged starling. Lake Kazuni is located in the reserve and supports a notable hippo population.

The Reserve has a wide variety of plants communities and there are 398 species of vascular plants from 71 families.
