= Kentam Products Limited =

Organization

- Type: Private
- Industry: Pharmaceuticals, chemicals
- Founded: 2000
- Founder: Kenneth Thindwa
- Area served: Malawi, international
- Products: Kilpain (paracetamol); Ketaprin (aspirin); Bufen (ibuprofen); Nutracid (antacid)

Kentam Product Limited is a Malawian pharmaceutical, and chemical manufacturing company that operates primarily in Luwinga (Northern Region). Kentam's high demand products in Malawi are Kilpain (paracetamol), Ketaprin (aspirin), and Bufen (ibuprofen).

It was founded by Malawian pharmacist Kenneth Thindwa.

== Products ==
- Kilpain (paracetamol)
- Ketaprin (aspirin)
- Bufen (ibuprofen)
- Nutracid (Antacid)

== Awards ==
- Current Good Manufacturing Practices(CGMP)Award 2010- Pharmacy, Medicine, and Poisons Board, Malawi
- Best Manufacturer- Malawi International Trade Fair 2009
