= Lake Kazuni =

Lake in Malawi

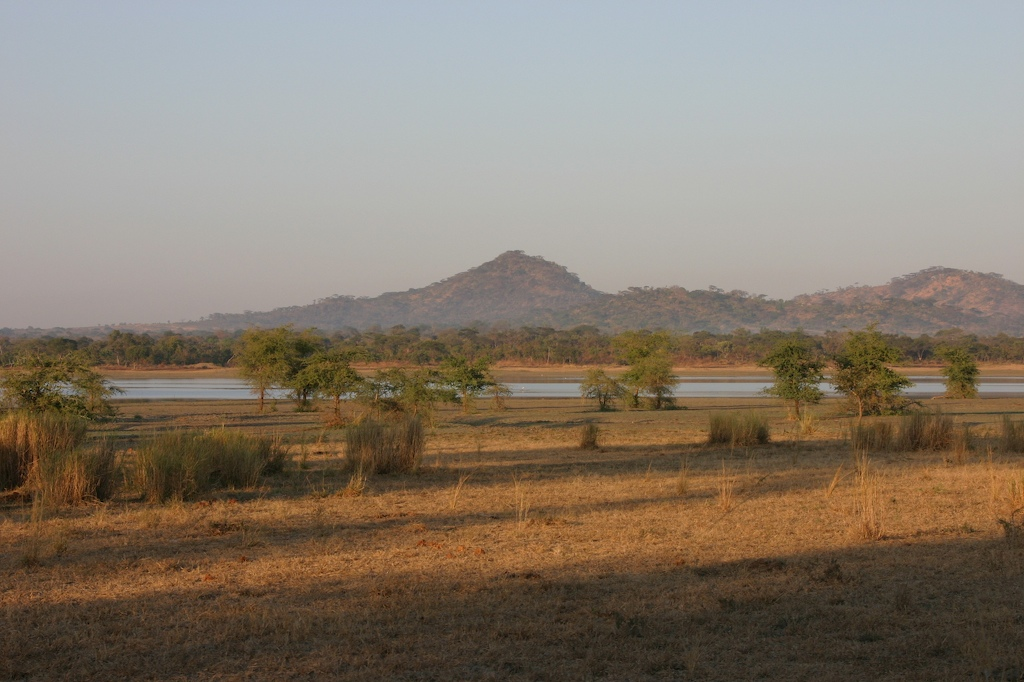

- Location within Malawi
- Location: Vwaza Marsh Game Reserve
- Coordinates: 11.1333°S 33.6667°E
- Basin countries: Malawi

Lake Kazuni is a lake in Malawi. It is located in the Vwaza Marsh Wildlife Reserve, near the main entrance.

The Kazuni Safari Camp is an important accommodation area near the lake. The lake supports a significant hippo population and elephants can be seen around the lake as well.

Lake Kazuni
