= Lake Kaulime =

Lake in Malawi

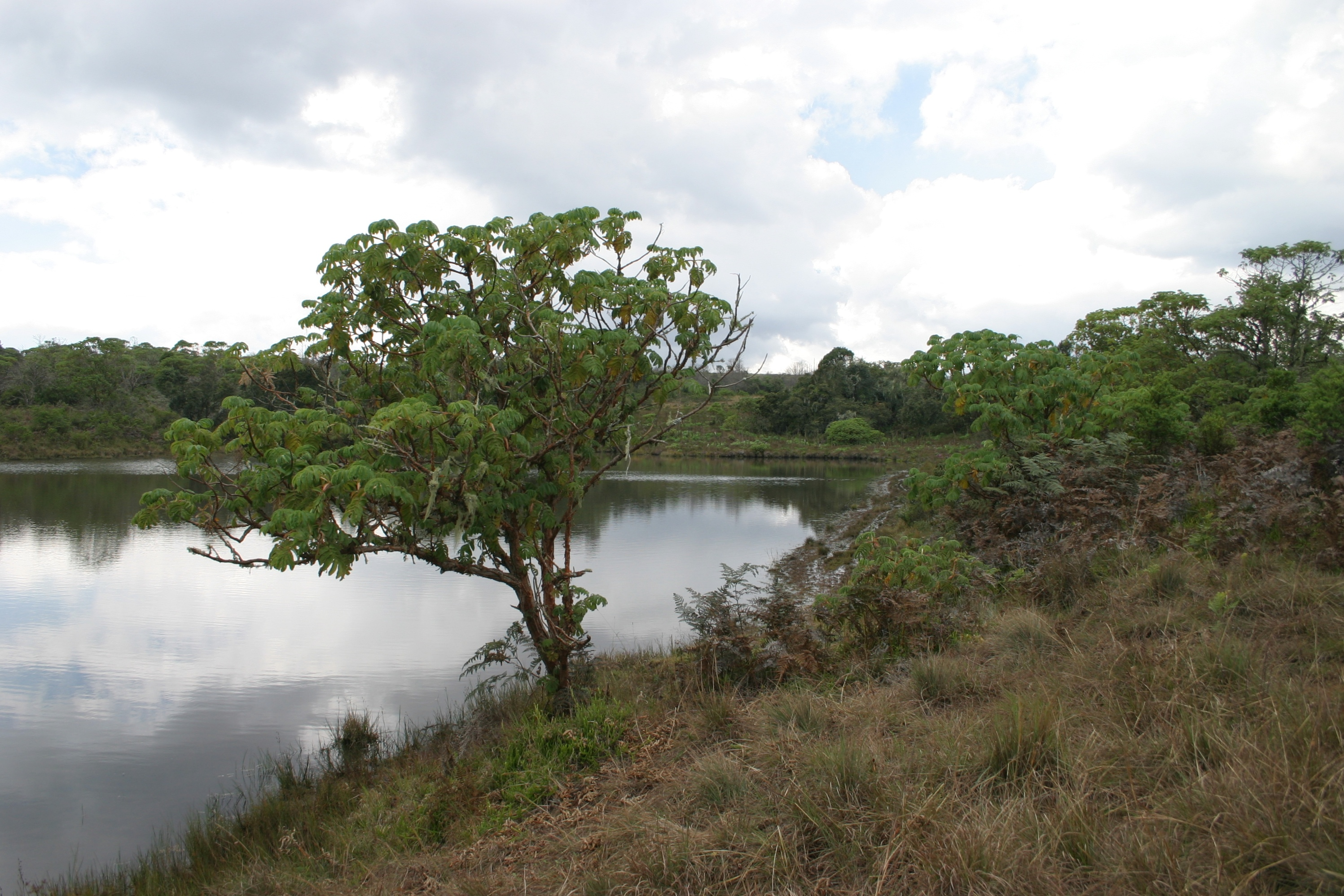

- Location within Malawi
- Location: Nyika National Park
- Coordinates: 10.5778°S 33.7608°E
- Basin countries: Malawi

Lake Kaulime is a lake of Malawi. It is 8 km west of Chisti, Malawi and is located inside Nyika National Park.
