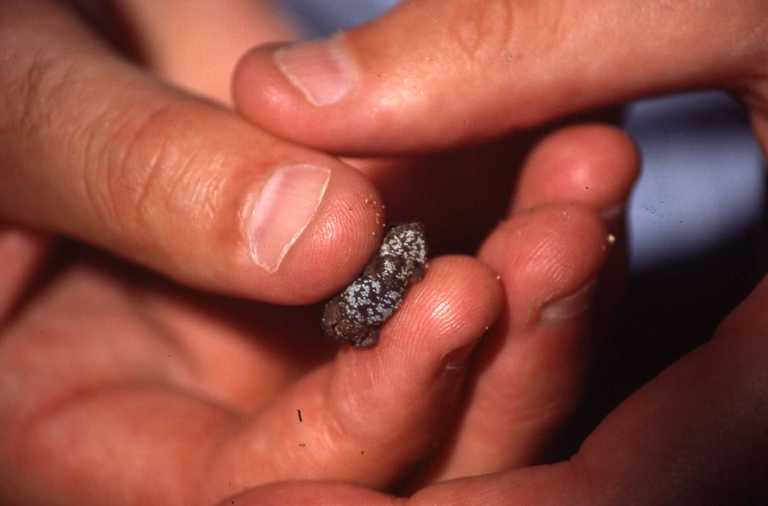
- Mertensophryne micranotis

Scientific classification
- Kingdom: Animalia
- Phylum: Chordata
- Class: Amphibia
- Order: Anura
- Family: Bufonidae
- Genus: Mertensophryne; Tihen, 1960

Type species
- Bufo (micranotis) rondoensis Loveridge, 1942

Species
- 14 species (see text)

Synonyms
- Stephopaedes Channing, 1979 "1978"

= Mertensophryne =

Genus of amphibians

Mertensophryne is a genus of true toads (family Bufonidae). They are found in eastern and southern Democratic Republic of Congo to Kenya, Tanzania, Malawi, southeastern Zimbabwe, and adjacent Mozambique. Their common names include snouted frogs, Chirinda forest toads, and forest toads. The genus is named for Robert Mertens, German zoologist and herpetologist.

== Taxonomy ==
Mertensophryne, as currently understood, consist of the former "Bufo" taitanus group and the genera Mertensophryne (as formerly defined) and Stephopaedes. The latter is monophyletic and still recognized as a subgenus. The closest relatives of Mertensophryne remain uncertain but probably include Poyntonophrynus, Vandijkophrynus, and Capensibufo.

== Description ==
Mertensophryne lack tympanum and columella. They frequently show digit reduction. They are relatively small frogs; among the ten species studied by Liedtke and colleagues, the maximum female snout–vent length varied between 24 and 46 mm (0.9 and 1.8 in). Eggs are relatively large, 1.8–2.5 mm (0.1–0.1 in) in diameter, and few in number (maximum 35–188).

== Species ==
There are 14 recognized species:

Binomial Name and Author	Common name
Mertensophryne anotis (Boulenger, 1907)	Mashonaland toad
Mertensophryne howelli (Poynton and Clarke, 1999)	Mrora forest toad
Mertensophryne lindneri (Mertens, 1955)	Dar es Salaam toad
Mertensophryne lonnbergi (Andersson, 1911)	Lonberg's toad
Mertensophryne loveridgei (Poynton, 1991)	Mahenge toad
Mertensophryne melanopleura (Schmidt and Inger, 1959)	Kankunde toad
Mertensophryne micranotis (Loveridge, 1925)	Loveridges snouted toad
Mertensophryne mocquardi (Angel, 1924)	Mocquards toad
Mertensophryne nairobiensis (Loveridge, 1932)	Nairobi toad
Mertensophryne nyikae (Loveridge, 1953)	Nyika dwarf toad
Mertensophryne schmidti Grandison, 1972	Schmidt's snouted frog
Mertensophryne taitana (Peters, 1878)	Black-chested dwarf toad
Mertensophryne usambarae (Poynton and Clarke, 1999)	Usambara forest toad
Mertensophryne uzunguensis (Loveridge, 1932)	Uzungwe toad
