= Second Vice-President of Malawi =

Second deputy executive post in the government of Malawi

Second Vice President of Malawi
- Coat of arms of Malawi

- Flag of Malawi
- Incumbent; Enoch Chihana since 5 October 2025
- Executive branch of the Government of Malawi
- Type: Deputy head of state
- Reports to: President of Malawi
- Residence: Lilongwe
- Seat: Lilongwe
- Appointer: President of Malawi
- Term length: Five years, renewable once
- Formation: 1994
- First holder: Chakufwa Chihana

The Second Vice President of Malawi is a constitutional office in the executive branch of the Government of Malawi. The post ranks immediately below the Vice President of Malawi. The current deputy vice president of Malawi is Enock Chihana. The position is appointed by the President and assists in the execution of governmental duties. The position also serves political and representational duties, especially in coalition contexts.

== Constitutional basis ==
The Constitution of Malawi grants the President power to appoint a Second Vice President. The office serves to provide balance in governance, usually used to strengthen political alliances and broaden representation within the executive.

== History ==
The office of Second Vice President was created in 1994 under the new multiparty constitutional framework, during the presidency of Bakili Muluzi. It was used in various administrations, though at times controversial or under debate for redundancy or constitutional clarity.

In September 2025, following general elections, Peter Mutharika won the presidency and officially sworn in as President. On 5 October 2025, he appointed Enoch Chihana as the Second Vice President. Chihana is a leader of the Alliance for Democracy (AFORD), which entered into a political alliance with Mutharika’s Democratic Progressive Party (DPP) ahead of the elections.

== Duties and functions ==
The duties of the Second Vice President include assisting the President and first Vice President in assigned tasks, representing the government at functions, and helping in coordination of governmental programs when delegated. The exact responsibilities are mostly defined by the President and may vary depending on political agreements, coalition arrangements, or specific needs of the administration.

== List of Second Vice Presidents ==
#	Name	Term start	Term end	President	Notes
1	Chakufwa Chihana	November 1994	June 2004	Bakili Muluzi	First occupant; under the UDF government
2	Chakufwa Chihana	15 June 2003	19 May 2004	Bakili Muluzi	Served under Muluzi's presidency
3	Enoch Chihana	5 October 2025	Incumbent	Peter Mutharika	Appointed after 2025 elections; AFORD-DPP political alliance

== See also ==
- President of Malawi
- Vice President of Malawi
- Politics of Malawi
- Cabinet of Malawi
