= Mertensophryne nyikae =

Conservation status
- Near Threatened (IUCN 3.1)

Scientific classification
- Kingdom: Animalia
- Phylum: Chordata
- Class: Amphibia
- Order: Anura
- Family: Bufonidae
- Genus: Mertensophryne
- Species: M. nyikae

Binomial name
- Mertensophryne nyikae (Loveridge, 1953)

Synonyms
- Bufo taitanus nyikae Loveridge, 1953; Bufo nyikae Loveridge, 1953

Species of amphibian

Mertensophryne nyikae (common name: Nyika dwarf toad) is a species of toad in the family Bufonidae. It is endemic to the Nyika Plateau of northern Malawi and adjacent northeastern Zambia. Its natural habitats are montane forests and nearby wet, boggy grasslands at approximately 2,500 m (8,200 ft) asl. Breeding takes place in small, shallow pools. Although its range is mostly (possibly entirely) within relatively well managed protected areas, habitat loss remains a potential threat.
