= Yeremia Chihana =

Malawian politician from 2019 to 2025

Honorable Yeremia Chihana

Member of Parliament of the National Assembly of Malawi
- In office 2019–2025
- Constituency: Mzimba North constituency

Personal details
- Born: Yeremia Chihana Malawi

Yeremia Chihana is a Malawian politician and Member of Parliament in the National Assembly of Malawi representing Mzimba North Constituency. He was elected to be a member of parliament in 2019.

== Career ==
Chihana has been in the Parliament of Malawi since 2012 under Peter Mutharika’s party. He has been critical to the Chakwera government since then.
