= Ngalamu River =

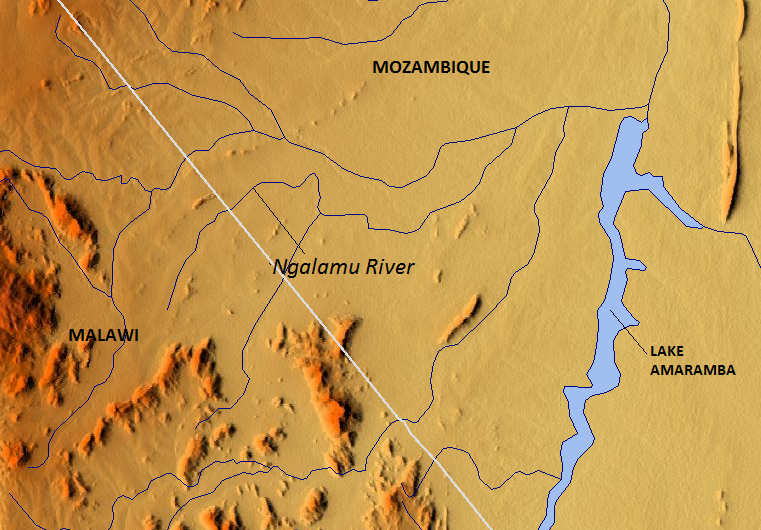

Location
- Country: Mozambique, Malawi

The Ngalamu River is a river of northern Mozambique and Malawi, located to the west of Lake Amaramba. It is located at 14°24′0″S 35°41′0″E.
