= Mertensophryne lonnbergi =

Conservation status
- Vulnerable (IUCN 3.1)

Scientific classification
- Kingdom: Animalia
- Phylum: Chordata
- Class: Amphibia
- Order: Anura
- Family: Bufonidae
- Genus: Mertensophryne
- Species: M. lonnbergi

Binomial name
- Mertensophryne lonnbergi (Andersson, 1911)

Synonyms
- Bufo lonnbergi Andersson, 1911

Species of amphibian

Mertensophryne lonnbergi (common name: Lönnbergs toad or Lonnbergs toad) is a species of toad in the family Bufonidae. It is endemic to Kenya and known from the highlands on both sides of the Great Rift Valley as well as from Mount Kenya. Its natural habitats are montane grasslands, moorlands, and forest patches; it can survive also on agricultural land. Breeding takes place in small and shallow permanent or semi-permanent pools. It is a reasonably common species, but habitat modification could still be a threat.
