= Matundwe Range =

Mountains in Malawi

Coordinates: 16.7°S 34.95°E

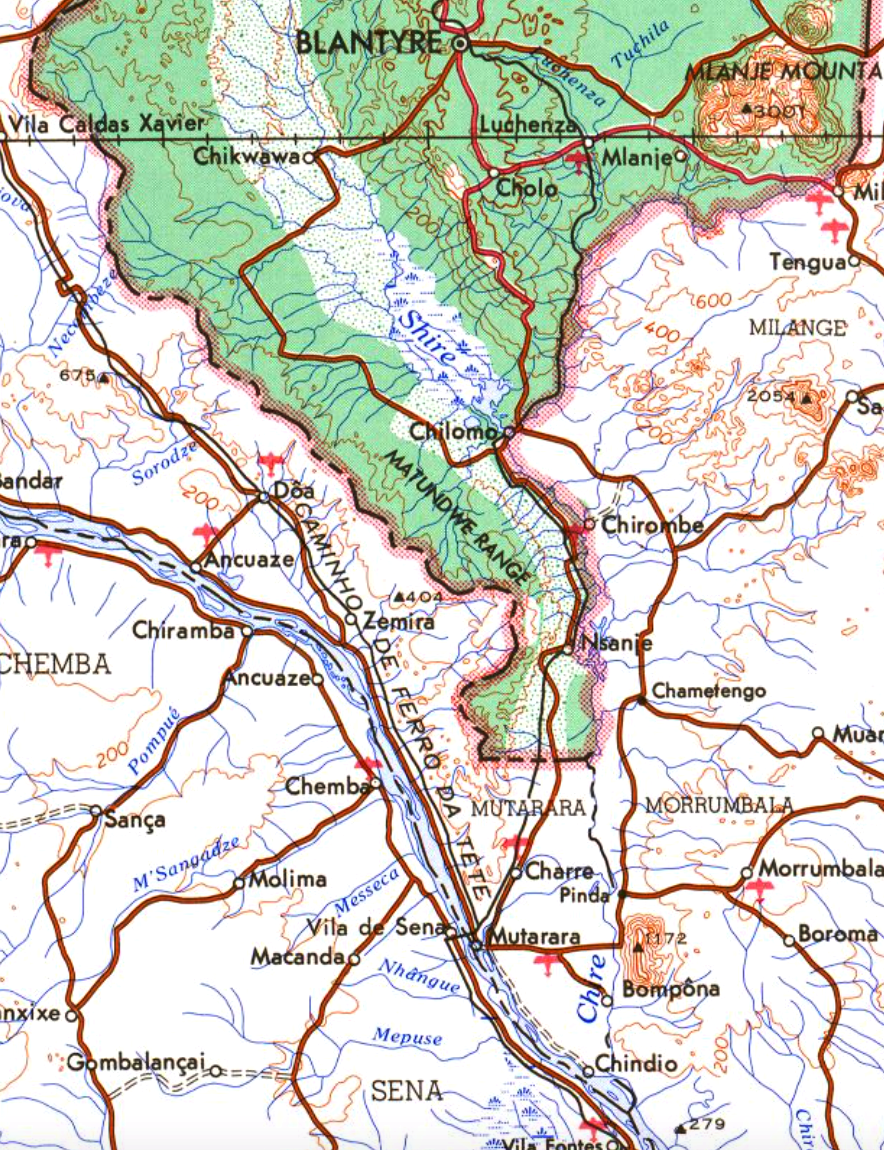
map of the Matundwe Range (center) and surrounding area of Malawi and Mozambique.

The Matundwe Range is a range of mountains in southernmost Malawi and adjacent Tete Province of Mozambique. The range is located between the Zambezi and Shire rivers just north of their confluence, and the Malawi-Mozambique border runs along the divide between the two rivers' watersheds.

The Shire River Valley is a southern extension of the East African Rift. The southern end of the Matundwe Range rises as a steep escarpment along the west side of the Shire Valley lowlands, and descends more gently westwards towards the Zambezi. At the northern end of the range, the western face of the range has a steep escarpment.

Malawi's Matandwe Forest Reserve covers part of the northern range. The reserve was established in 1931, and covers an area of 31,053 ha. The main plant community in the reserve is open-canopy miombo woodland dominated by Brachystegia species, particularly B. boehmii, along with Uapaca kirkiana. Mwabvi Wildlife Reserve lies west of the range at its northern end, in the valley of the Mwabvi River, a northward-flowing tributary of the Shire.
