= Kenneth Thindwa =

Malawian politician, pharmacist, & entrepreneur (born 1943)

Kenneth James Mumbo Thindwa (born 1943) is a Malawian pharmacist, entrepreneur, and former MP for Rumphi between 2004 and 2009. He was born in Chombe Village, Rumphi. He has a Phd in Pharmacy and has worked for Queen Elizabeth Central Hospital, Sterling Winthrop (Pharmanova). He is the founder of pharmaceutical company Kentam Products Ltd.

== Career and education ==
He attended Mzuzu Government Secondary School and went to college at California State in the United States. He met his late wife, Tamara Thindwa in college. They then left the US for Malawi where he worked at Central Government Stores and his wife at the Reserve Bank. He was also on the board of the Malawi pharmaceutical board, helping to establish pharmaceutical standards in Malawi. Dr. Thidwa became business partners with his wife where they jointly engaged in entrepreneurship projects in Malawi, including founding of Kentam Products ltd, and Kentam Mall. He joined politics by running and serving as MP for Rumphi East.
