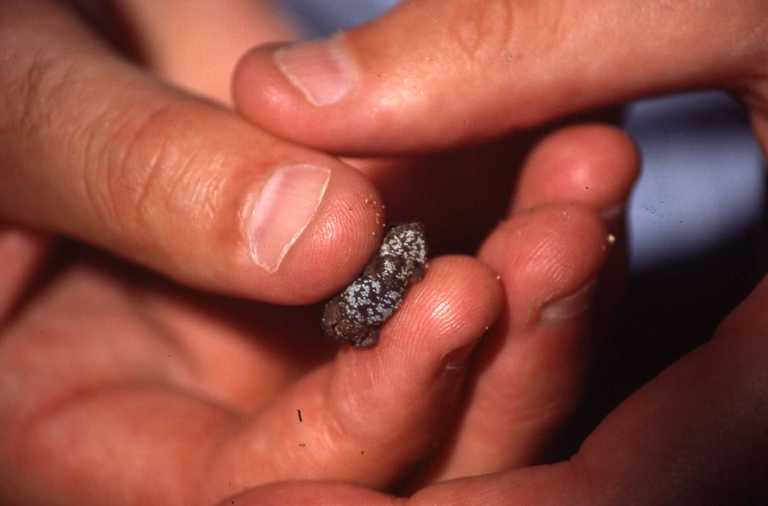

Conservation status
- Least Concern (IUCN 3.1)

Scientific classification
- Kingdom: Animalia
- Phylum: Chordata
- Class: Amphibia
- Order: Anura
- Family: Bufonidae
- Genus: Mertensophryne
- Species: M. micranotis

Binomial name
- Mertensophryne micranotis (Loveridge, 1925)

Synonyms
- Bufo micranotis Loveridge, 1925

= Mertensophryne micranotis =

Species of amphibian

Mertensophryne micranotis is a species of toad in the family Bufonidae. It is found in southeastern Kenya and eastern Tanzania, including Zanzibar and Songo Songo Island. Its natural habitats are lowland forests, dense woodlands, thickets, and the forest-miombo woodland boundaries. It is regularly seen but difficult to detect. It is probably affected by habitat loss caused by agriculture, wood extraction and human settlement.
