= Chirinda toad =

Conservation status
- Least Concern (IUCN 3.1)

Scientific classification
- Kingdom: Animalia
- Phylum: Chordata
- Class: Amphibia
- Order: Anura
- Family: Bufonidae
- Genus: Mertensophryne
- Species: M. anotis

Binomial name
- Mertensophryne anotis (Boulenger, 1907)

Synonyms
- Bufo anotis Boulenger, 1907; Stephopaedes anotis (Boulenger, 1907)

Species of amphibian

The Chirinda toad, Chrinda forest toad, Mashonaland toad or Boulenger's earless toad (Mertensophryne anotis) is a species of toad in the family Bufonidae with a restricted distribution in eastern Zimbabwe and western Mozambique.

== Description ==
The Chrinda toad is small, about 45mm in snout to vent length. The head length is equal to its width, with a pointed snout projecting beyond its mouth and the skin is covered in smooth warts. It lacks a tympanum and the paratoid glands are large and reach the base of the arm on the sides. It has short fingers and short toes which are one-third webbed, the webs are covered with granules. The back and sides of the head are either blackish or light colored with blackish cross-bars and the underside is yellow and spotted with black.

== Distribution ==
The Chrinda toad occurs in the Chirinda Forest in eastern Zimbabwe and in the Dombé Forest in adjacent Mozambique. There is also a recent record from Quirimbas National Park in northeastern Mozambique that may either suggest that the species is more widespread than previously assumed, or represent a disjunct population, possible of a different species.

== Habitat ==
The natural habitats of the Chrinda toad are lowland and montane evergreen forests where it lives in leaf-litter or hides in or under rotten logs.

== Habits ==
The adult Chirinda toads tend to hide within the leaf litter on the forest floor. The eggs are laid in small pools of water between the buttress roots of Chrysophyllum gorungosanum trees, or in the water filled grooves in the bark of fallen trees.

== Conservation ==
It is threatened by habitat loss caused by agricultural encroachment, wood extraction, and expanding human settlements. It occurs in one protected areas; the Ngungunyana State Forest in Zimbabwe, which is within the Chirinda Forest, and possibly also in the Quirimbas National Park in Mozambique. The restricted habitat of this species is still being degraded despite any apparent protection and the species is assessed as endangered.
