= Mwabvi Wildlife Reserve =

National park in Malawi

- IUCN category IV (habitat/species management area)
- Location within Malawi
- Location: Nsanje District, Malawi
- Coordinates: 16°40′S 35°0′E
- Area: 135 km^{2} (52 sq mi)
- Established: 1953 extended 1975
- Governing body: Department of National Parks and Wildlife

Mwabvi Wildlife Reserve is the smallest wildlife reserve in Malawi, covering approximately 135 km^{2} (52 mi^{2}). The park was established in 1953 and expanded in 1975. Since then there have been several conservation efforts to help maintain the park. It hosts a wide variety of habitats and wildlife and is known for being home to the last of the Malawi Black Rhino population.

== Etymology ==
The park gets its name from the "Mwabvi Tree" which is the Henga name for the Ordeal Tree which is native to this part of Africa.

== History ==
The Thangadzi Game Reserve was founded in 1928 and later became the Mwabvi Wildlife Reserve in 1953. By 1975 the park had expanded to 135 km^{2}.

In 2004, the Project African Wilderness, a nonprofit organization, was formed to conserve the Mwabvi Wildlife Reserve. This organization helped set up several facilities within the park including game roads and tourist lodges.

== Location ==
Mwabvi Wildlife Reserve is in the Nsanje District near the southernmost tip of the country. It includes a portion of the Matundwe Range (which forms a part of the border with Mozambique) and is situated near the Shire River lowlands. The wildlife reserve sits at an elevation between 150 m (492 ft) and 400 m (1,312 ft) above sea level. It is located near Lengwe National Park and Majete Wildlife Reserve.

== Geography ==
Mwabvi Wildlife Reserve features a diverse range of habitats, including mopane, Combretum, dry Brachystegia woodland, open savanna, dambo, sandstone hills, and riverine areas. There are also many rocky cliffs throughout the park.

It is a very remote area which makes it difficult to access. Walking tours can be arranged by the park's Game Rangers. Otherwise the only way to get into the park is in a 4x4 vehicle.

== Wildlife ==
Mwabvi Wildlife Reserve previously served as a habitat to all of Africa's “Big Five” game animals, hosting a much wider diversity of fauna than today. In the mid-20th century, the last of Malawi's black rhinoceros population was located here. However, decades of heavy poaching have reduced Megafauna populations. By the late 20th century, black rhinoceros, elephants, and lions were extirpated from the reserve. Today, Cape buffalo remaind the only "Big Five" resident here.

Several antelope species and other small to mid-sized mammals are still commonly found in the reserve. These include small herds of Nyala, Sable antelope, Greater kudu, Impala, Suni, and Common duiker. Warthogs, baboons, and vervet monkeys also inhabit Mwabvi.

Larger predators are infrequently observed in the reserve. leopards, spotted hyenas, jackals, and servals have been recorded, but in very low numbers. There are no resident lion prides, although lions residing primarily in neighboring Mozambique have been seen in the reserve.

Mwabvi has a diverse bird population, with over 270 bird species documented in the reserve. Notable birds include the Woodwards' batis and Grey waxbill, among hundreds of other species adapted to the dry woodland and savanna habitat. Birdwatching is a source of tourism in the reserve.

== Administration and protection ==
In February 2007, the Project African Wilderness organization signed a management agreement with Malawi's Department of National Parks and Wildlife to take over the conservation and development of the reserve.

However, by 2018, Project African Wilderness had its charity status removed by the Charity Commission for England and Wales. The park is now under the control of The Department of National Parks and Wildlife(DNPW)

Currently there are conservation projects being worked on by the government and local communities.
