= Moses Chirambo =

Malawian politician

Minister of Health of Malawi
- In office 15 June 2009 – 8 July 2016
- President: Bingu wa Mutharika

Personal details
- Born: Malawi
- Died: 14 August 2010
- Party: Democratic Progressive Party (Malawi)

Moses Chirambo was a Malawian politician and ophthalmologist. He was the former Minister of Health in Malawi, having been appointed to the position in early 2009 by the former president of Malawi, Bingu wa Mutharika. His term began on 15 June 2009.

Chirambo was Malawi's first ophthalmologist before entering politics. He was elected by the voters in the Rumphi Central Constituency in 2009. He died on 14 August 2010.

Awards and achievements
Preceded by	Minister of Health of Malawi	Succeeded by
