= Lilongwe River =

Coordinates: 13°47′S 34°25′E

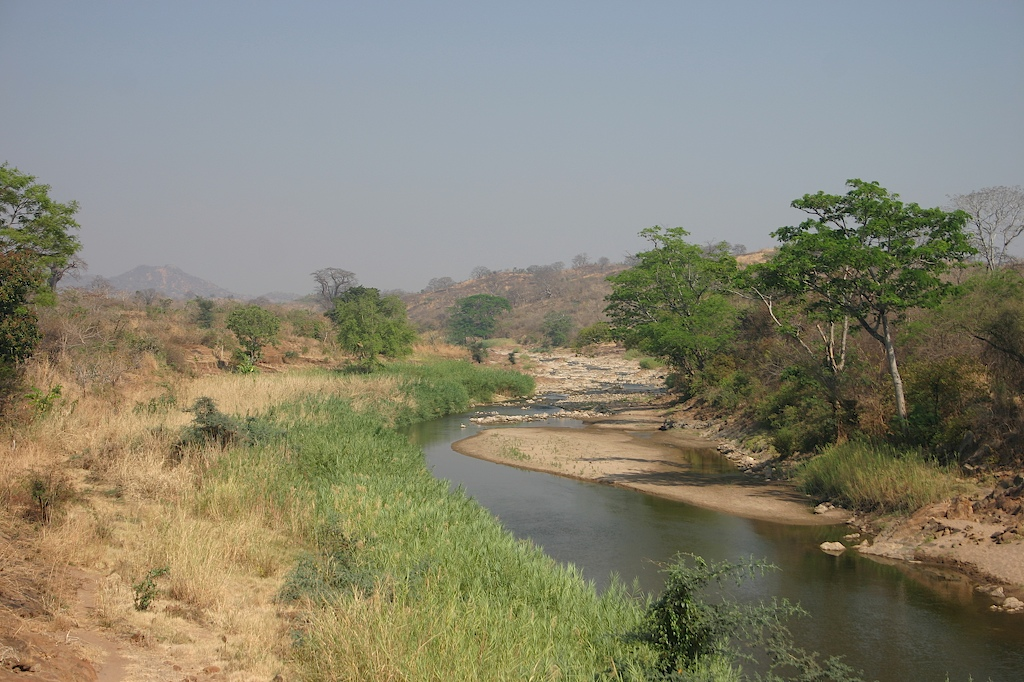

Location
- Country: Malawi

Physical characteristics
- Mouth: Lake Malawi
- Length: 200 km (120 mi)

Lilongwe River is a river in Malawi. It flows through Lilongwe, the capital of the country.

The river is approximately 200 km long, and flows into Lake Malawi.

It originates from the Dzalanyama Forest Reserve, between the border of the districts of Lilongwe and Dedza.

The Lilongwe River is the main source of water for Lilongwe city residents.
