= Nyika National Park =

National park in Malawi

- IUCN category II (national park)
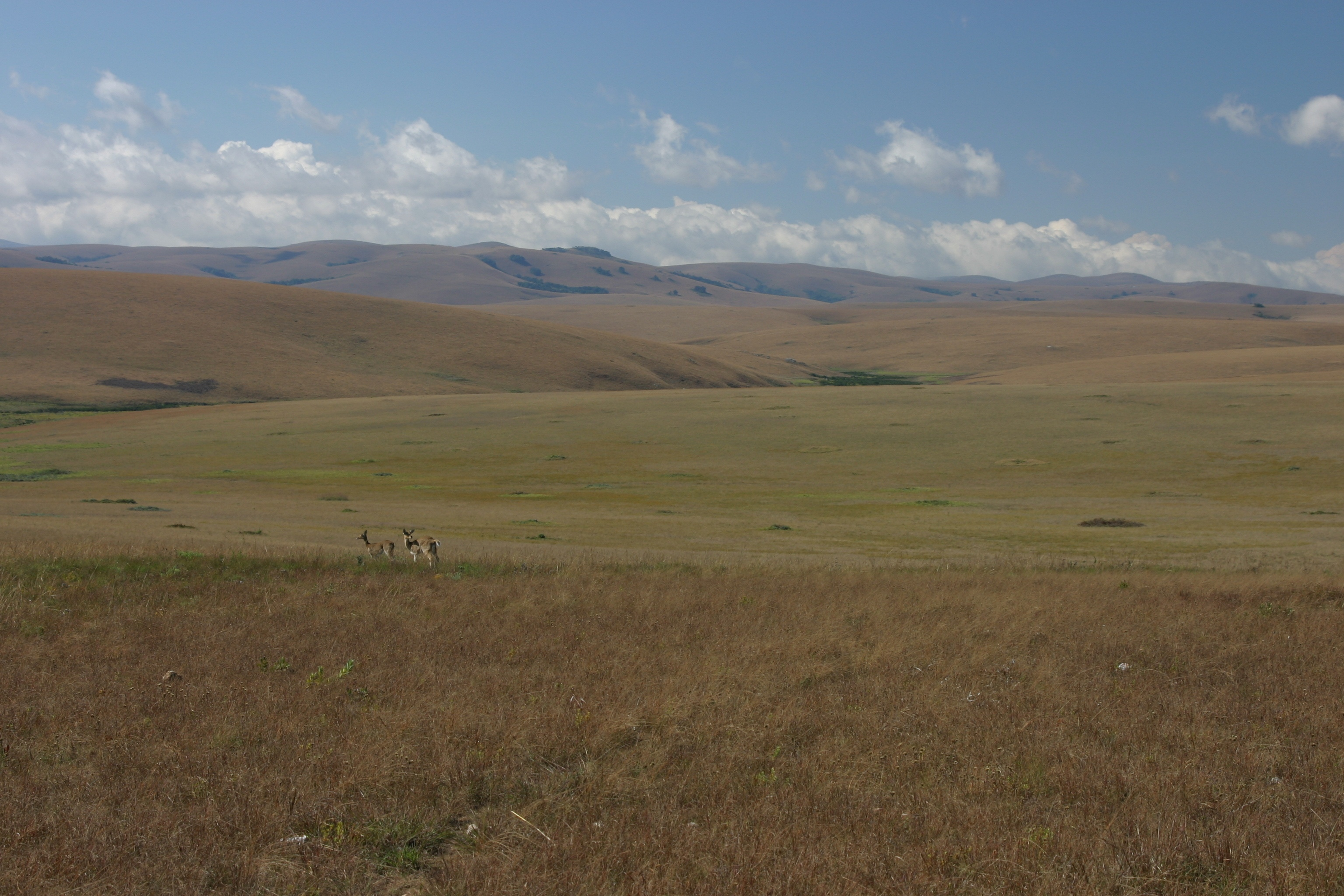
- Afromontane grassland of the Nyika Plateau

- Location within Malawi
- Location: Malawi
- Coordinates: 10°40′S 33°50′E
- Area: 3,134 km^{2} (1,210 sq mi)
- Established: 1966 extended 1978

Nyika National Park is Malawi’s largest national park, with an area of 3200 km^{2} (1250 mile^{2}).

== Location and road access ==
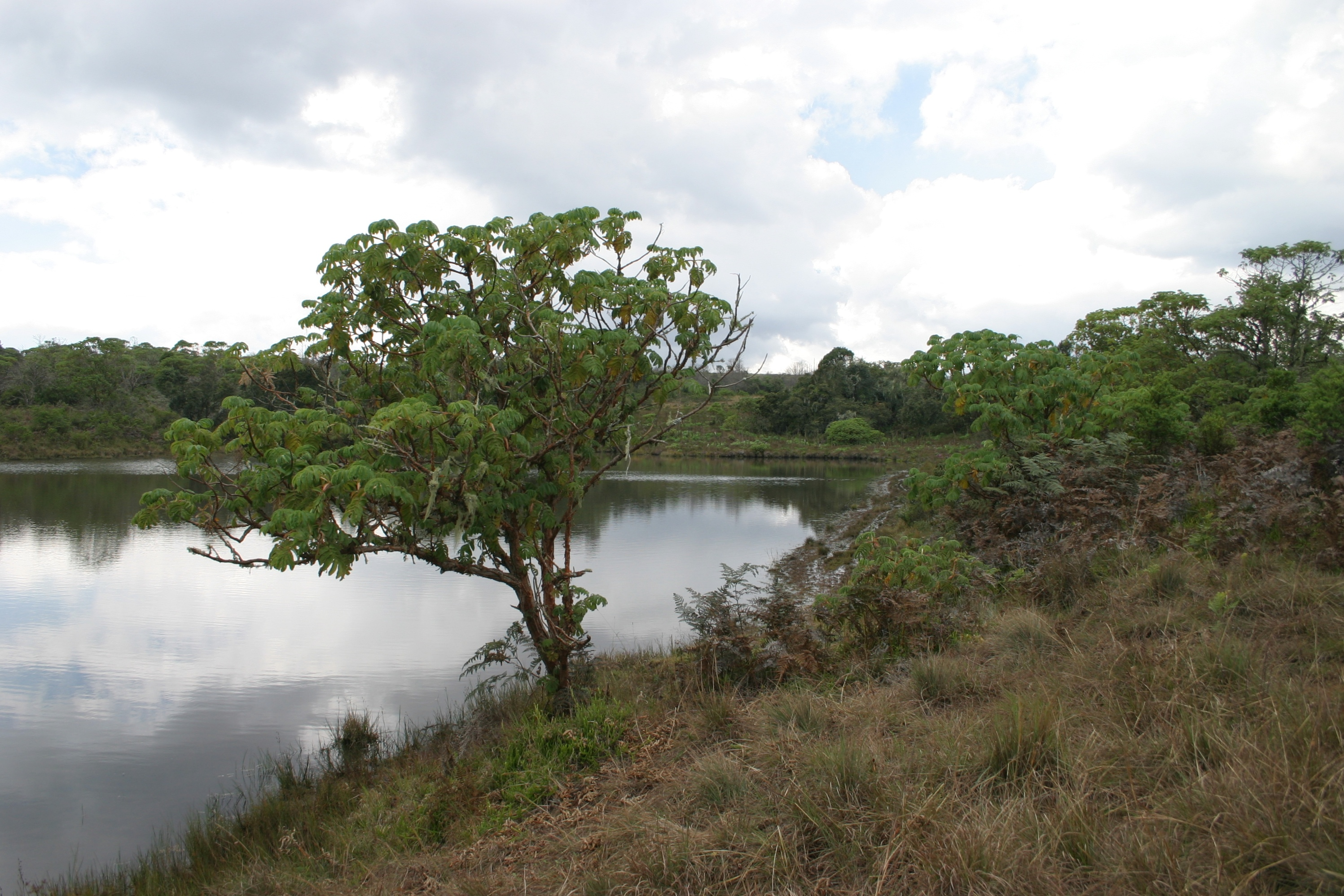
Lake Kaulime inside the park

The park covers practically the whole of the Nyika Plateau in northern Malawi, about 480 km north of Lilongwe and 60 km north of Rumphi by road. Access is by a single dirt road which branches north off the road from Rumphi to the Katumbi border post, and winds its way up the south-western scarp of the plateau, continues over the top, where it forms the border with Zambia, then descends the north-west scarp in a series of bends, and continues north to the Chisenga border post. On the top of the plateau, a spur goes east to Chelinda, the headquarters of the park nearer the centre. Although the park boundary comes within 35 km of Livingstonia there is no access from the eastern side.

== Features ==
The name Nyika means "where the water comes from" as the plateau's elevation makes it wetter than surrounding areas. Other suggested meanings are "wilderness" and "short grassland". The top is frequently in cloud, both in the rainy season and in the cold dry season when dense fogs, called Chiperoni, may persist well into the morning and sometimes all day. The persistent moisture brings over 200 types of orchid into flower. The grasslands of Nyika are rich in wildflowers all through the year but especially from January to April during the rains.

Most people experience the Nyika by staying on or driving over the plateau itself but this represents only around one third of the national park. The escarpments and northern hill areas descend to lower altitude and feature a much drier landscape seasonally. This is dominated by Brachystegia woodland and Protea scrub at the interzone between the grassland and the woodlands. To travel into these zones you will need to be fully equipped for camping and accompanied by a local guide. It is very easy to get lost and leaving the marked roads is not recommended without local support.

The plateau itself is recommended for trekking and mountain biking, as well as more conventional 4x4 excursions. The montane vegetation attracts large numbers of antelope from the diminutive Common duiker to eland and roan. Zebra are common near Chelinda and the highest part of the plateau. The park is said to have one of the highest densities of leopards in Central Africa but this has not been supported by any scientific survey in the past 20 years and all mammals suffer changes in populations which can be rapid. Being mainly nocturnal they are rarely seen, although tracks and signs have been regularly found. There are a number of species of smaller mammals such as warthogs and bushpigs, the smaller cats and porcupine. Elephants are often seen anywhere on the plateau but buffalo are rare or probably extinct now. Hoof prints associated with them in the north of the park probably represent wandering domestic cattle from Uledi. Lions and elephants have recently been seen on the high plateau.

Over 400 species of bird have been recorded in the park. The rare Denham’s bustard and the wattled crane are among those to be seen, as is the red-winged francolin.

Other attractions include waterfalls, the most impressive being Chisanga Falls where the North Rukuru river falls off the plateau to Thalire District, neolithic rock shelter, trout pools and even a "magic lake". The recently refurbished Chelinda Camp and the brand new log cabin lodge provide excellent accommodation and facilities. There is an airstrip for fly-in safaris.

The lower-lying Vwaza Marsh Game Reserve is close to the Nyika National Park and can be accessed off the Rumphi Road on arrival or departure to the Nyika entrance gate at Thazima.

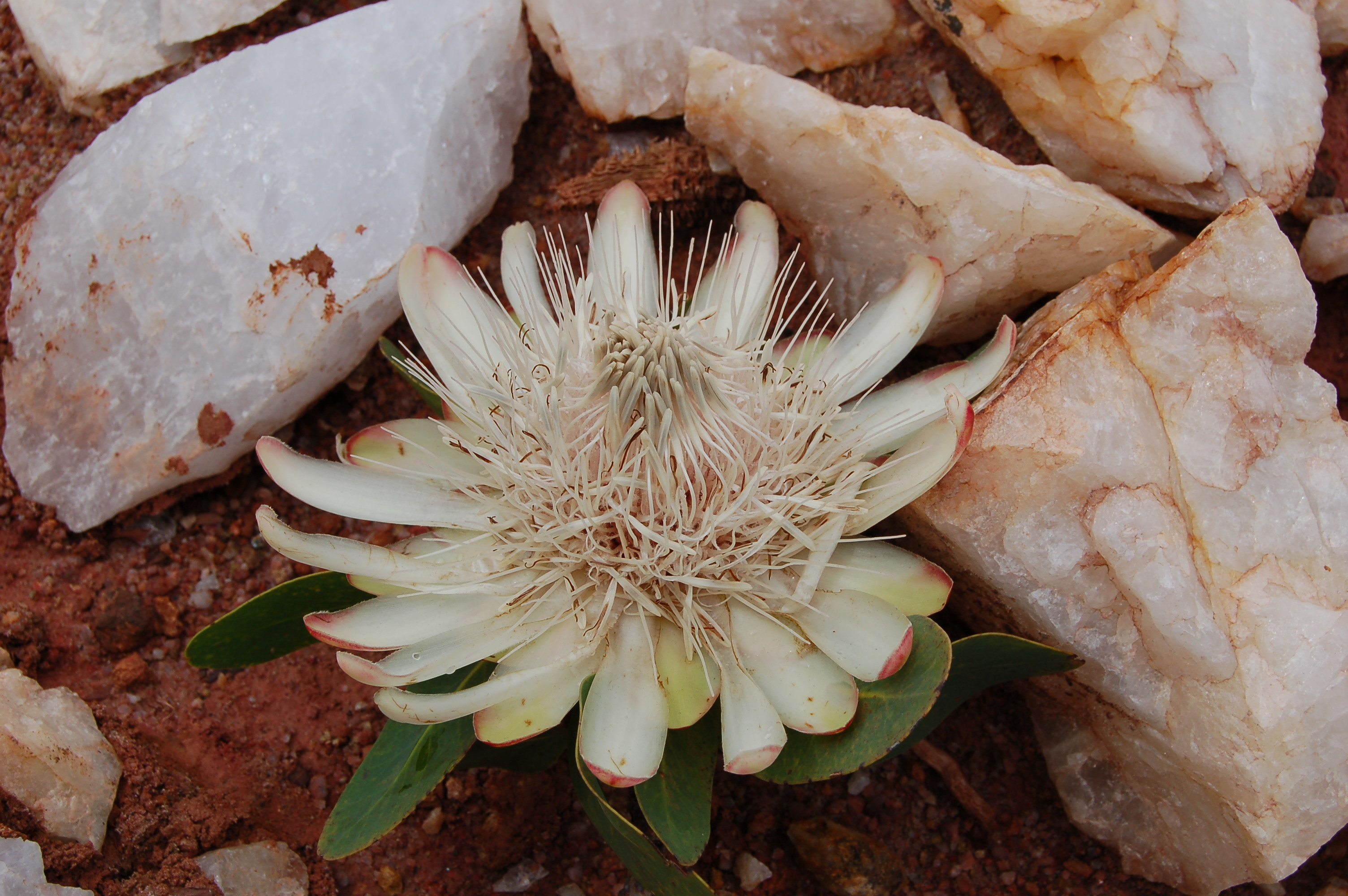
A flower sitting among quartz stones in Nyika National Park.

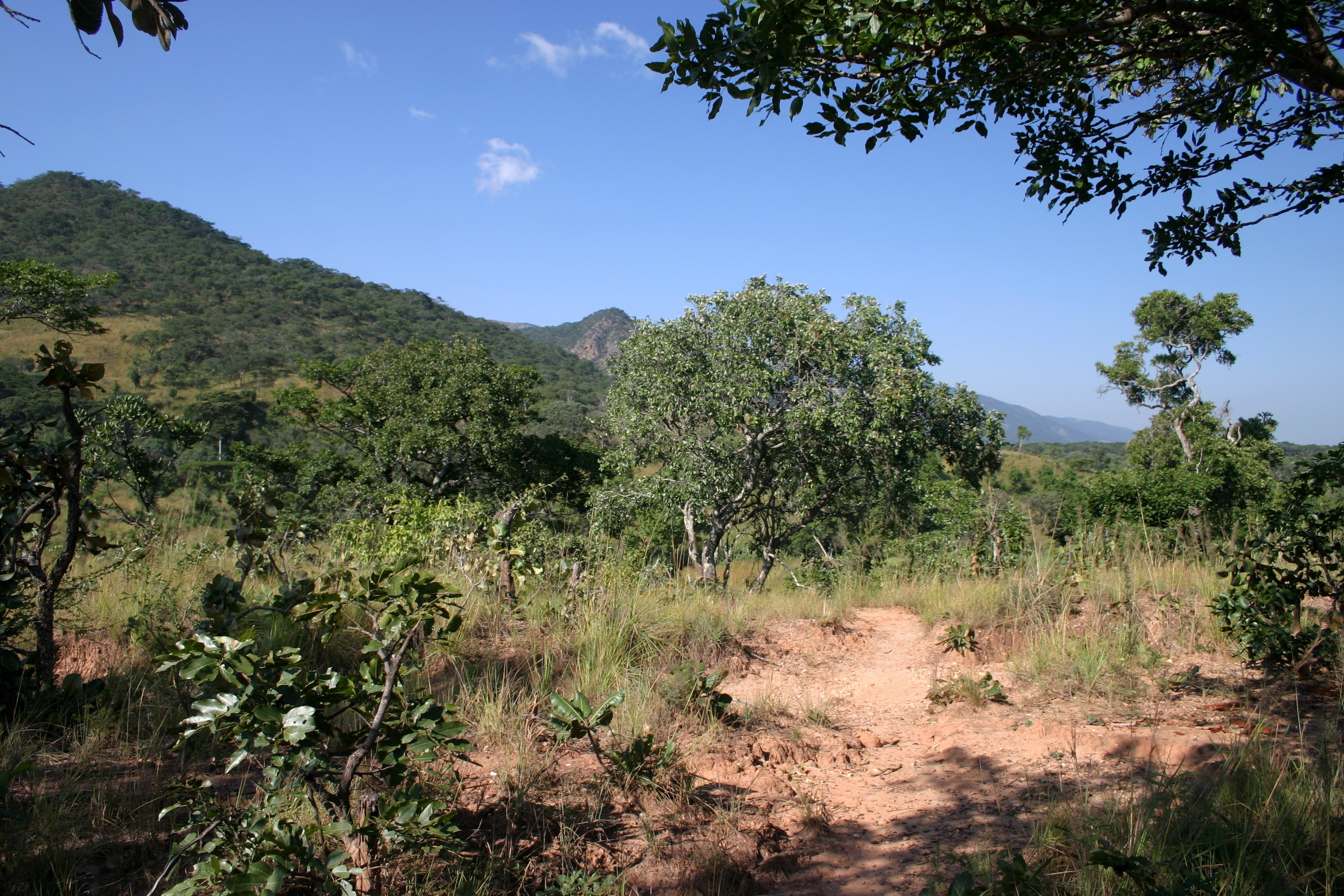
Miombo forest inside the park

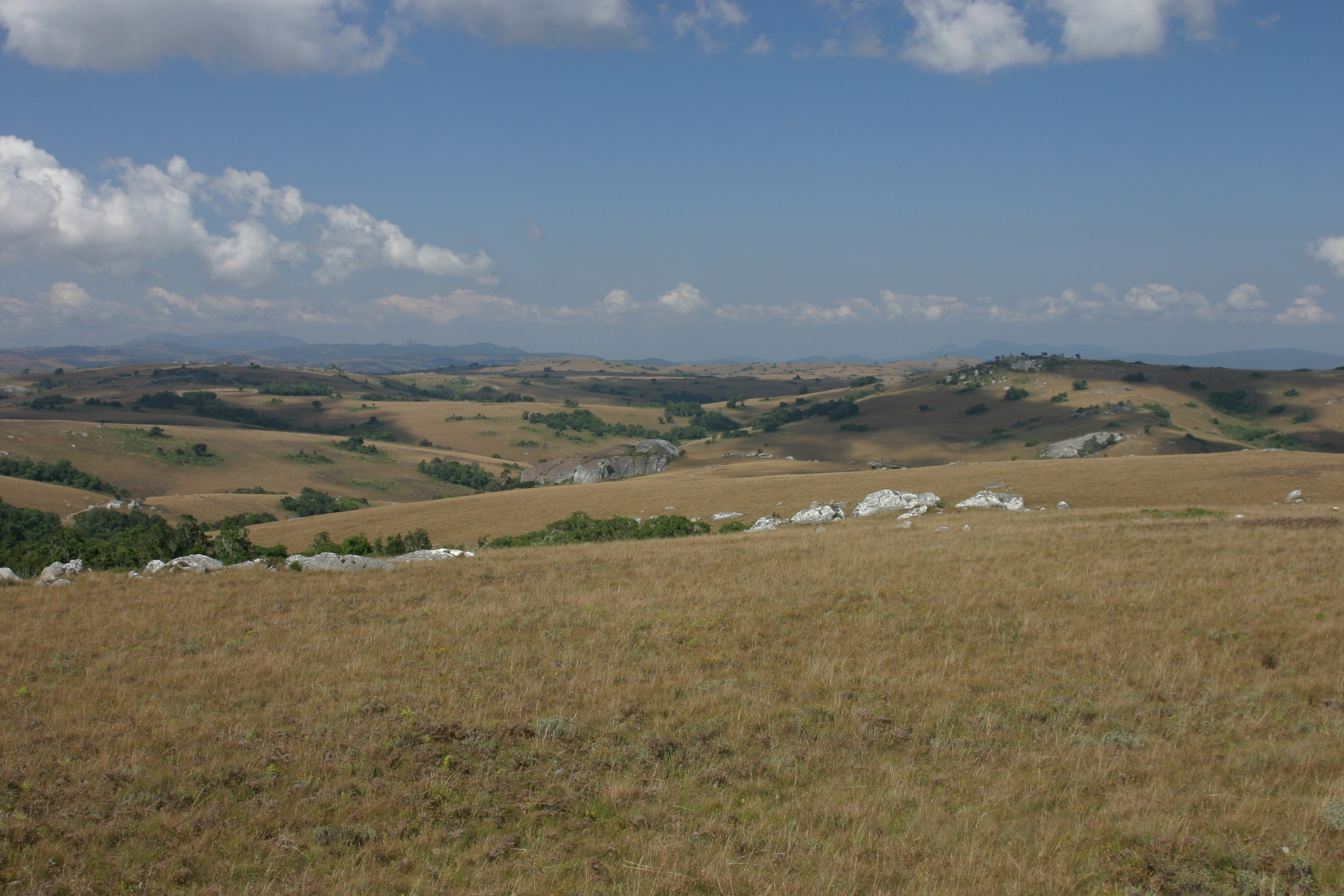
Typical landscape on the plateau

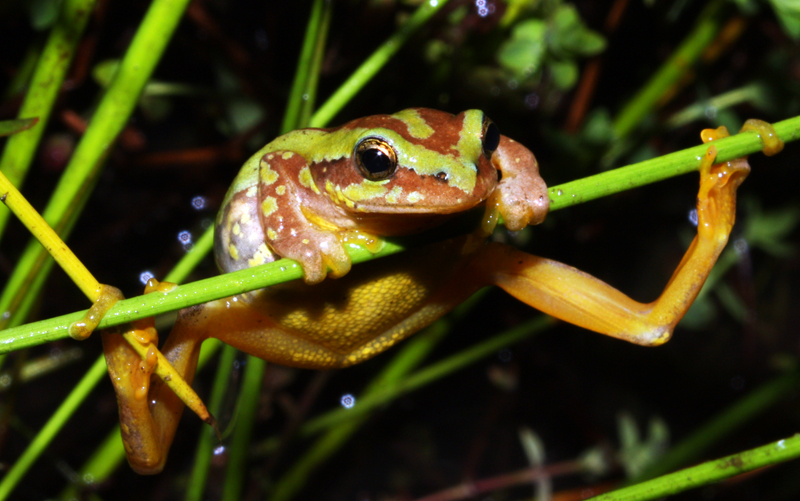
Hyperolius pictus

== The adjacent Zambian park ==
The land west of the plateau road as it traverses the top is in Zambia, which also calls its portion Nyika National Park, comprising just 80 km^{2}. As there is no other road, Zambians can only reach it via Malawi. The Zambian park includes a colonial-era resthouse with splendid views west. Once it was the only accommodation in either park, in those days people from Malawi staying there did not have to pass through any border formalities, but paid a "Zambia entrance fee" along with their accommodation bill. The rest house closed in 1998. Proposals to re-open it did not progress and it currently (2015) remains derelict.

== World Heritage status ==
This site was added to the UNESCO World Heritage Tentative List on May 17, 2000, in the Mixed (Cultural + Natural) category. It has not yet progressed to acceptance.
