= Dwangwa River =

River in Malawi

Coordinates: 12°31′S 34°12′E

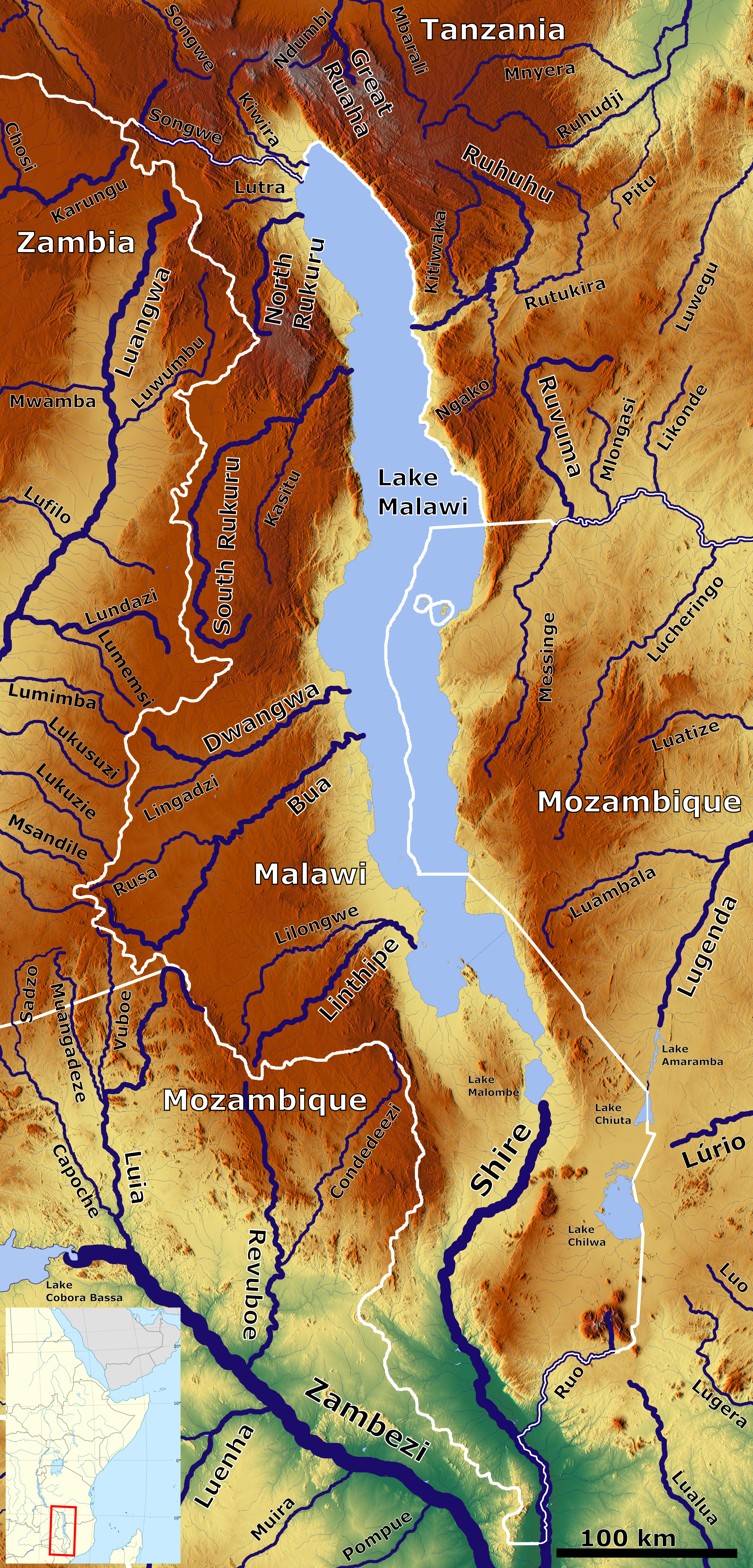
Dwangwa River (center left)

The Dwangwa River is a river in Malawi, which flows into Lake Malawi. Its source is in the Kasungu National Park, in Malawi's central plateau. It flows north-easterly from this plateau through an ancient valley. The river's mouth flows out of a more recently cut gorge, into the lake. It also flows through the Bana Swamp. Its length is approximately 100 miles (160 km).

The river is used both for irrigation and the generation of hydroelectric power. It is a fishing river, with prawns found in the river.
