= South Rukuru River =

River in Malawi

Coordinates: 10°44′S 34°14′E

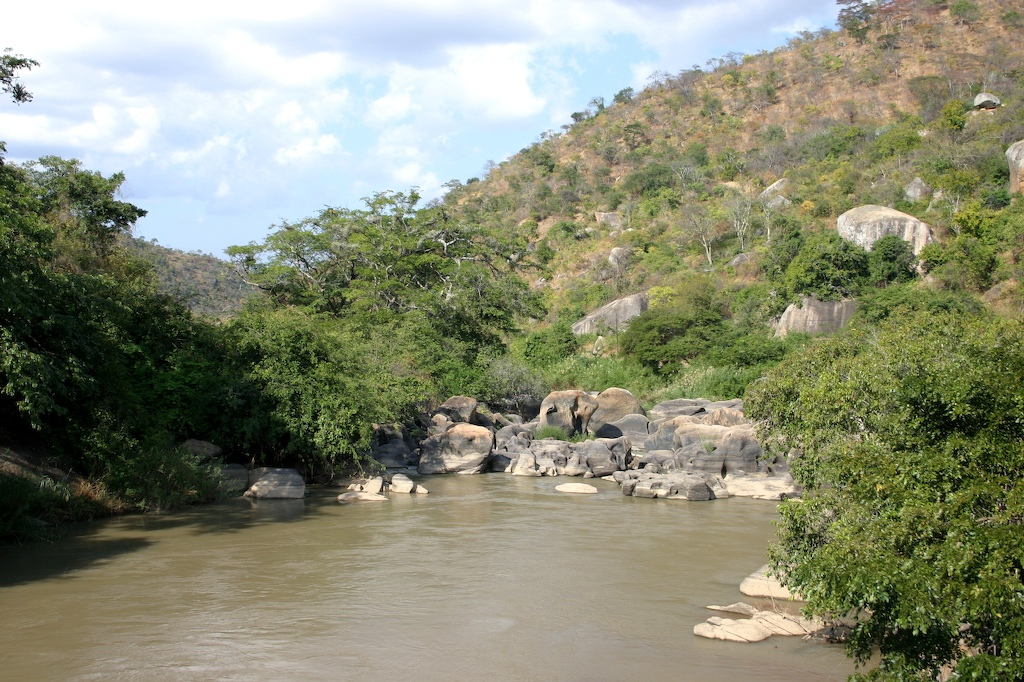
South Rukuru River

The South Rukuru River is a river of northern Malawi.

The South Rukuru rises in southern Mzimba District and flows roughly north-northeast to empty into Lake Malawi. Its watershed mostly lies in the Mzimba Plain. Its tributaries drain the western slopes of the Viphya Mountains. To the east, a low divide which forms the Malawi-Zambia border separates the South Rukuru's watershed from that of Luangwa River in Zambia. The lower valley of the river separates the northern end of the Viphya Range from the Nyika Plateau to the north.

The Department of Irrigation is currently developing a large irrigation scheme which will cover an area of 4,000 hectares in the Rumphi district on the left bank of the South Rukuru River. The project is supported by the European Union and will benefit almost 2,300 farmers in the region.
