= Nyika Plateau =

Plateau in Malawi

Coordinates: 10.35°S 33.60°E

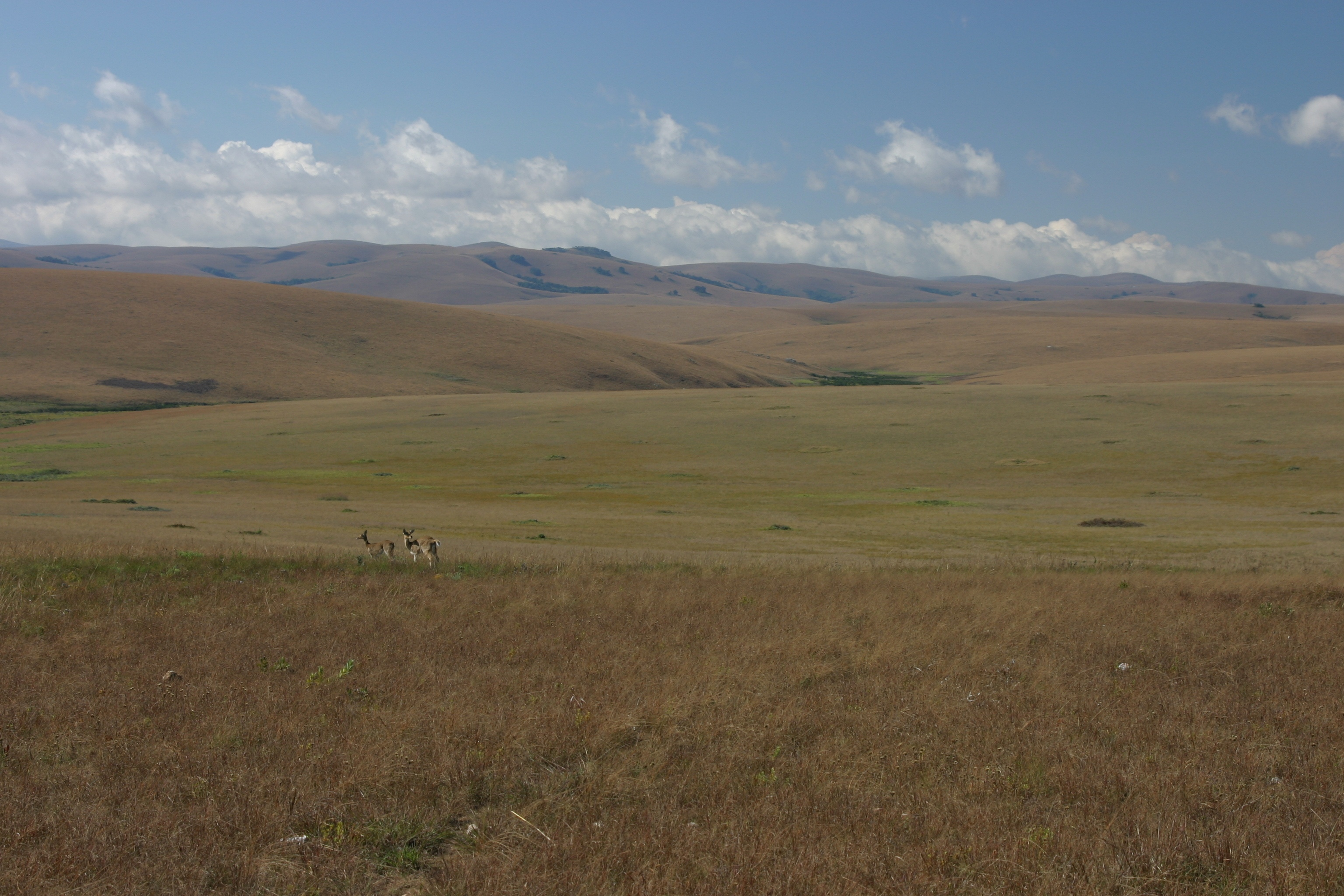
Afromontane grassland of the Nyika Plateau

The Nyika Plateau lies in northern Malawi, with a small portion in north eastern Zambia. Most of it lies at elevations of between 2,100 and 2,200 m (6,900 and 7,200 ft), the highest point being 2,605 m (8,547 ft) at Nganda Peak. It is roughly a diamond in shape, with a long north–south axis of about 90 km (56 mi), and an east–west axis of about 50 km (31 mi). It towers above Lake Malawi (elevation 475 m (1,600 ft)), and the towns of Livingstonia and Chilumba. Its well-defined north-west escarpment rises about 700 m (2,300 ft) above the north-eastern extremity of the Luangwa Valley, and its similarly prominent south-east escarpment rises about 1,000 m (3,300 ft) above the South Rukuru River valley. It is very different in scenery from other parts of Malawi, consisting of rolling hills with little streams in broad valleys, and rough grassland with clumps of pine trees.

== Wildlife and human settlement ==
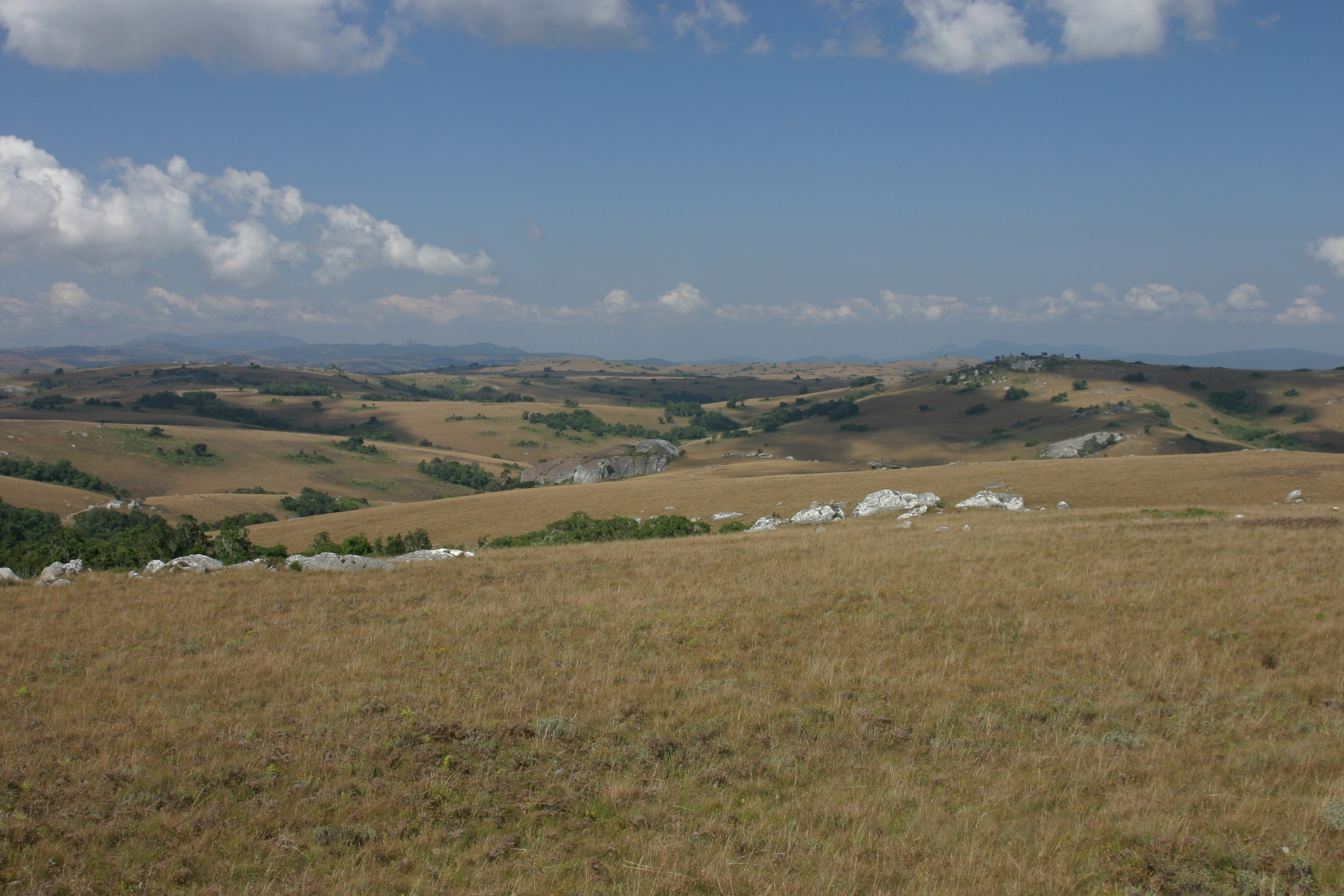

It is known for its wildlife; mammals in the park include Crawshay's zebras, bushbucks, reedbucks, roan antelopes, elands, klipspringers, duikers, and warthogs. Also present are carnivores including jackals, hyenas and leopards. There are also many birds and endemic butterflies, chameleons, frogs and toads (e.g., Nyika dwarf toad), and also for its orchids. All of the plateau is protected, by Malawi's large Nyika National Park and the much smaller Nyika National Park, Zambia. The only settlement on the plateau is Chelinda, the headquarters and accommodation site for the Malawian park.

== Flora ==
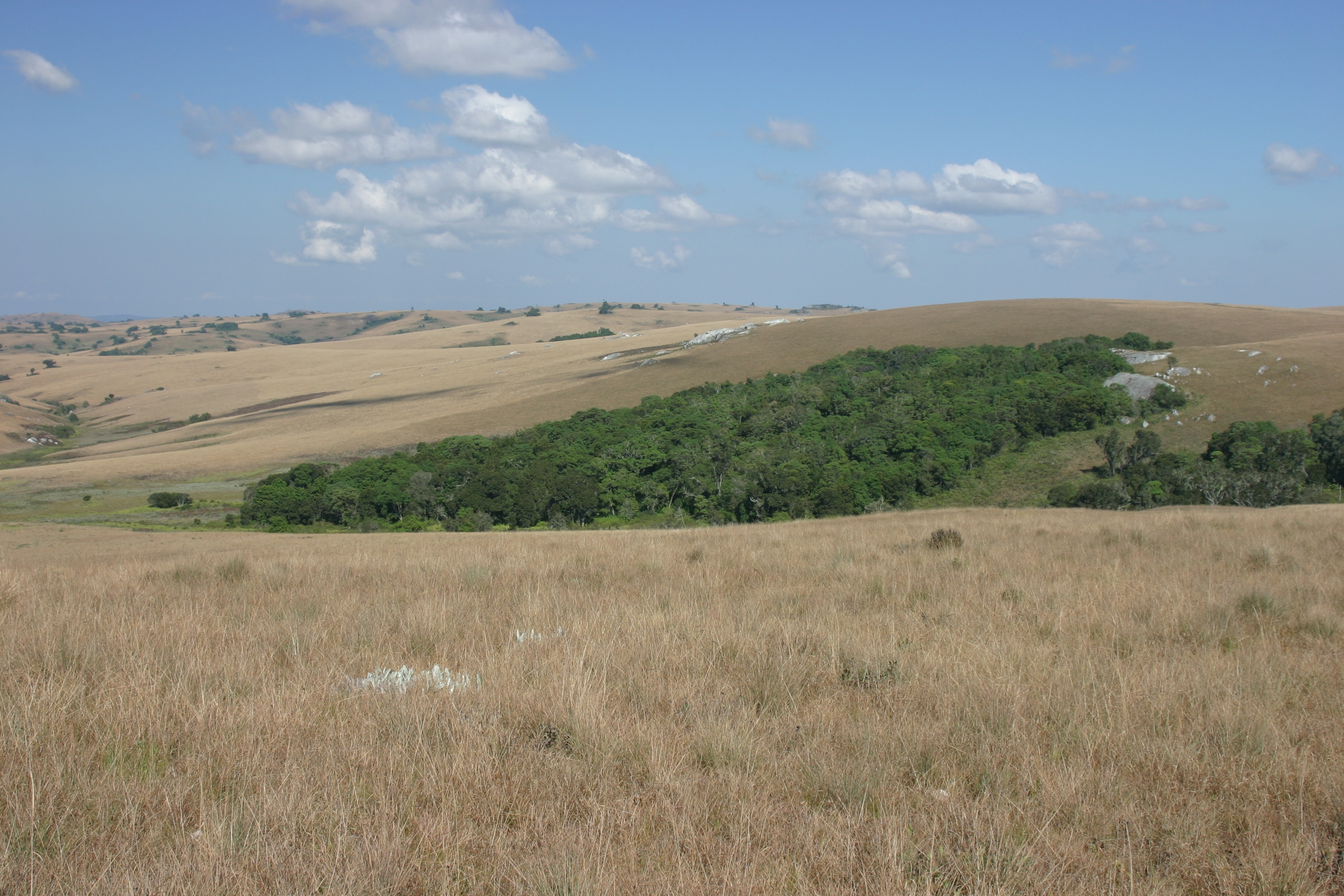
A grove of afromontane forest on the Nyika Plateau.

A large area of the Nyika Plateau, around 3,000 km^{2} (1,200 sq mi), makes up the Nyika National Park. Owing to its protected status, endemic flora continue to flourish in this part of the plateau. The flora of the plateau include gladioli, delphiniums, lobelia, and 'red hot pokers'. The plateau is also home to around 200 species of orchids. Groves of montane forests also dot the plateau.
