= Fwemba =

Traditional Tumbuka dance of protest and celebration

- Native name: Gule wa Fwemba
- Etymology: Dance as if a warrior
- Genre: Traditional dance
- Instrument(s): Drums, etc
- Inventor: Tumbuka people
- Year: c.1925 AD
- Origin: Eastern Zambia
- Related dances: Vimbuza, Mganda, Mapenenga

Fwemba is a ritualistic and expressive dance performed by the Tumbuka people in Eastern Zambia, particularly in districts such as Lundazi, Chasefu, and Lumezi, as well as Chama in Muchinga Province. The dance features energetic and martial movements that convey both community celebration and resistance. The Chitumbuka word term Fwemba is tied to its dual role as both a victory dance and a form of protest.

== History ==
Fwemba originated as a martial dance performed by Tumbuka warriors upon returning from victorious battles, allowing them to publicly display their physical tactics and communal triumph. During the colonial period, it evolved into a form of protest against oppression, giving voice to collective dissent and cultural pride.

The dance is part of the broader category of militaristic mimes, sharing origins with Mganda, Malipenga, and Kalela, performances that emerged during the colonial era and world wars as both entertainment and subtle socio-political commentary. Fwemba in particular served as a medium for celebration, raising awareness of colonial injustices.

== Cultural significance and contemporary performance ==
Fwemba continues to be performed at weddings, festivals, chiefly gatherings, and community celebrations, preserving Tumbuka cultural identity. Its martial origin and protest symbolism remain culturally, enabling modern Tumbuka communities to honor ancestral heritage and assert social values.

== See also ==
- Kulonga Traditional Ceremony
- Zengani Traditional Ceremony
