= Tumbuka language cluster =

Dialect cluster of the Tumbuka language

Tumbuka dialect cluster
- Region: Malawi, Zambia, Tanzania, Zimbabwe
- Language family: Niger–Congo?: Atlantic–Congo; Volta-Congo; Benue–Congo; Bantoid; Southern Bantoid; Bantu; Nyasa; Tumbuka dialect cluster
- Dialects: Tumbuka; Phoka; Senga; Yombe; Wenya; Fililwa; Malawi Tonga; Manda; Henga; Hewe; Mpoto; Nkhonde; Southern Tumbuka; Mzimba Tumbuka; Nkhata Bay Tumbuka; Kamanga

Language codes
- ISO 639-3: tum
- Glottolog: tumb1250

The Tumbuka dialect cluster refers to the range of dialects and related languages in the same family of the Tumbuka language, a Bantu language spoken primarily in Malawi, Zambia, parts of southern Tanzania and Zimbabwe. While there is a recognized Standard Tumbuka based on varieties around Rumphi and former mission centers such as Livingstonia, a number of dialects continue to be used locally. These dialects show both the historical diversity of Tumbuka-speaking peoples and the influence of contact with neighboring languages such as Ngoni and Ngonde.

== Dialects ==
=== Kamanga ===
It is spoken in the Rumphi area of northern Malawi, especially around Bolero and Hewe. The Kamanga dialect is closely tied to the former Nkhamanga Kingdom and is considered one of the oldest Tumbuka dialects. Today, it survives but is heavily influenced by the standard form of Tumbuka.

=== Henga dialect ===
It is spoken mainly in the Rumphi and Mzimba districts of northern Malawi. The Henga people developed their dialect in the Henga Valley, with notable differences in vocabulary and tone compared to Standard Tumbuka.

=== Phoka dialect ===
Phoka is spoken northernmost parts of Rumphi, particularly in Livingstonia and the Nyika Plateau area. It preserves some archaic features of Tumbuka and is noted for phonological differences.

=== Chikulamayembe ===
Centering around the Rumphi lowlands, the dialect is associated with the Chikulamayembe chieftaincy. It shares much with Standard Tumbuka but carries local vocabulary influenced by neighboring hokaj

=== Nkhonde dialect ===
Nkhonde is the dialect of Tumbuka spoken along th Karonga and parts of Chitipa, where Tumbuka speakers are in contact with the Ngonde people. It contains loanwords and tonal patterns borrowed from the Ngonde language.

=== Eastern Zambia Tumbuka (Eastern Tumbuka dialect) ===
This is spoken in Lundazi, Chasefu, Lumezi, Isoka, and Chama in Zambia’s Eastern Province. This variety has regional vocabulary and some phonological divergence due to contact with Chewa and Nsenga.

=== Yombe dialect ===
Yombe dialect is spoken by the Tumbuka people of the Yombe sub group in Mafinga District in Muchinga Province, Zambia.

== Relationship with neighbouring languages ==
The Tumbuka dialects are part of the wider Nyasa languages group within Guthrie’s Bantu classification (N.20). They are closely related to Chewa (N.31), Sena (N.44), and Ngonde (N.10), with which they share vocabulary, phonological traits, and mutual intelligibility to varying degrees.

== Other Bantu languages in Tanzania ==
Although the Tumbuka dialect cluster is centered in northern Malawi and eastern Zambia, several other Bantu languages are spoken in southern Tanzania, geographically close to the Nyasa–Tumbuka area. These languages are distant part of the Tumbuka cluster, but share some historical connections.

Language	Guthrie classification	Location	Notes
Manda (Manda-Matumba)	N.11 (sometimes reassigned to G60)	Eastern shore of Lake Malawi, Tanzania	Part of the Tumbuka cluster; shares contact features with Nyasa Bantu languages.
Ngoni language (Tanzania)	N.12	Southern Tanzania	Linked historically to Tumbuka people through Ngoni migrations; linguistically distinct with many Tumbuka words incorporated in.
Matengo	N.13	Southern Highlands, Tanzania	Related to Manda and Mpoto; part of proto-Tumbuka dialect.
Mpoto	N.14	Near Lake Malawi, Tanzania	Geographically adjacent to Tumbuka region; part of the Tumbuka language cluster

== See also ==
- Tumbuka people
- Languages of Malawi
- Languages of Tanzania
