= Tumbuka Heritage Association =

Cultural organization

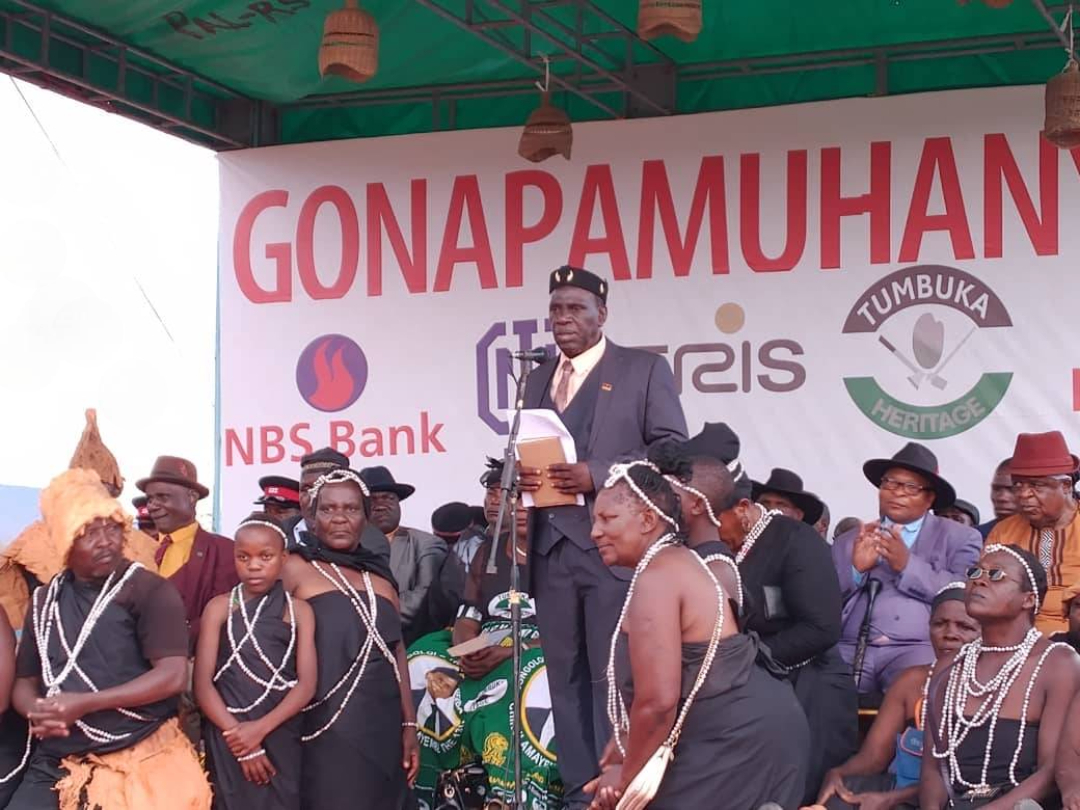
- The cultural event of Gonapamuhanya festival of the Tumbuka people in 2025 that took place in Malawi supported by Malawi Government and Tumbuka Heritage
- Abbreviation: TUHERI
- Type: Cultural organization
- Headquarters: Rumphi District, Malawi
- Region served: Malawi; Zambia; Tanzania; Tumbuka communities in neighbouring countries
- Fields: Cultural preservation, documentation, heritage promotion
- Traditional Authority: Themba la Mathemba Chikulamayembe
- Key people: Ephraim Kanyimbo (Project Officer)
- Affiliations: Copyright Society of Malawi (COSOMA)

The Tumbuka Heritage Association or simply Tumbuka Heritage (abbreviated as TUHERI) is a cultural organisation that was established in Malawi to preserve, promote and document the history, traditions and cultural expressions of the Tumbuka people in Malawi, Zambia, Tanzania and neighbouring countries. The organization is supported by the government of Malawi.

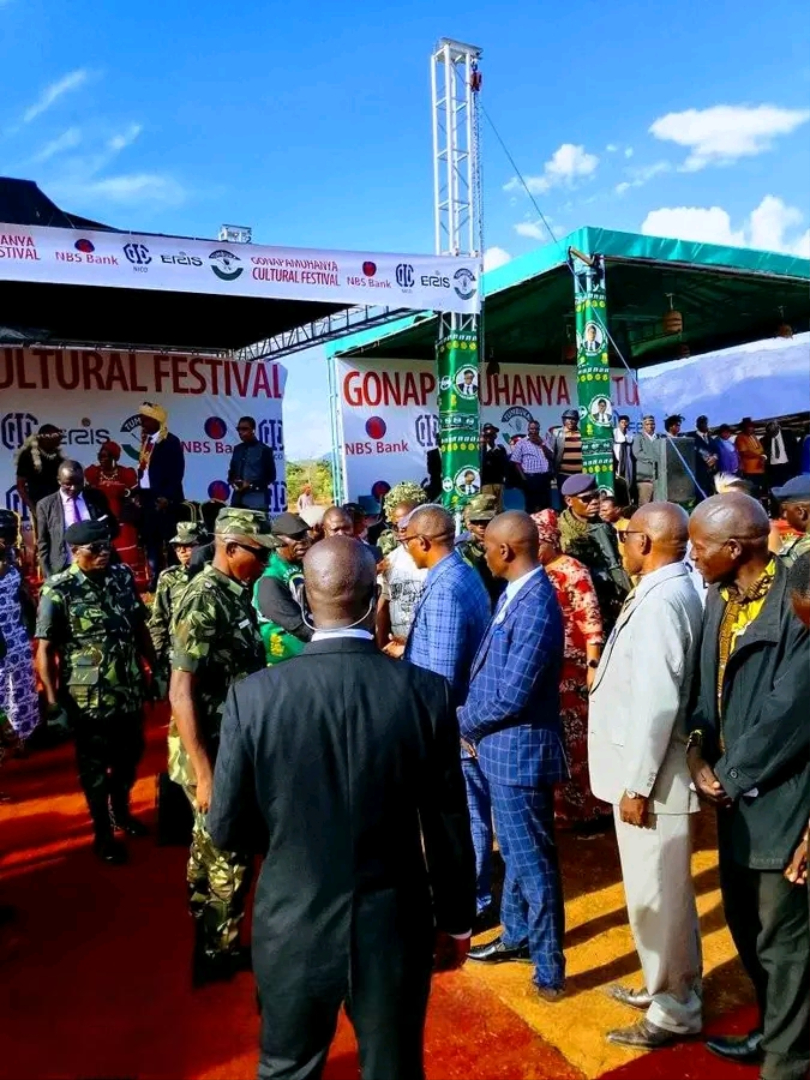
The event of Gonapamuhanya festival of the Tumbuka people in 2025 that took place in Malawi

The organization also partially maintains different annual cultural festivals such as Gonapamhanya (Malawi), Kulonga and Vinkhakanimba (Zambia) all of which are supported by governments of their countries.

== History and background ==
The association claims to have been established to respond to concerns that the traditional knowledge of the Tumbuka people, which had been stored and transmitted orally for generations, was at risk of being lost. For many years, cultural knowledge such as clan histories, dances, tools and place names existed mainly through memory and word of mouth. As communities modernised, elders passed away, and archival structures remained weak, the need for formal documentation grew stronger.

The organisation works under the authority of the Chikulamayembe Dynasty and collaborates with traditional leaders, cultural custodians and community groups in Rumphi District and other Tumbuka regions.

== Documentation project ==
In May 2023, the Tumbuka Heritage Association was brought on a documentation project aimed at recording cultural heritage in written, visual and audio formats. The initiative is supported financially by the Copyright Society of Malawi (COSOMA) Fund, which is part of Malawi Government.

National Coordinator Hubert Mfune reported that the pilot phase in Rumphi was progressing well, with most major activities already documented. According to Mfune, the project culminated in an open day to showcase the collected materials.

Project Officer, Ephraim Kanyimbo, stated that the project has so far received support from government and traditional leadership.

=== Areas of documentation ===
The project focuses on several categories of cultural knowledge, including performing arts such as traditional dances, music and ceremonies; crafts and material culture including clay pots, water coolers and traditional clothing; tools such as hoes, hunting implements and fishing equipment; and historical names, place names and oral histories of the Tumbuka people.

After the Rumphi pilot phase, the association plans to extend documentation to other countries where Tumbuka communities reside.

== Functions and activities ==
The association undertakes research, archiving, cultural festivals, exhibitions and educational programmes. It collaborates with institutions such as schools, broadcasters and museums to preserve language, oral histories and artefacts and to promote awareness of Tumbuka cultural identity.

== Leadership ==
The organisation operates under the cultural authority of the Chikulamayembe Dynasty. Project figures include National Coordinator Hubert Mfune and Project Officer Ephraim Kanyimbo, supported by local cultural officers and community representatives.

== Partnerships ==
The association works with COSOMA, traditional leaders, government cultural offices, media organisations such as the Malawi Broadcasting Corporation and community groups. The partnerships allegedly provide financial support, technical assistance and access to cultural resources.

== See also ==
- Tumbuka people
- Chikulamayembe Dynasty
- Tumbuka language
- Culture of Malawi
