= Traditional dances and festivals of the Tumbuka people =

Traditional dances and festivals of the Tumbuka people of Malawi, Tanzania and Zambia

Traditional dances and festivals of the Tumbuka people comprise a range of ritual, healing, celebratory and entertainment practices found chiefly among the Tumbuka of Tanzania, northern and central Malawi, and Muchinga and Eastern Zambia. The best documented of these is Vimbuza, a therapeutic dance and music inscribed by UNESCO on the representative list of the intangible cultural heritage of humanity in 2008. Other widely performed genres include Malipenga/Mganda, as well as regionally specific forms such as Mtungo (Magali), Ulumba, and Visekese. Annual festivals include Gonapamuhanya which is government sponsored and Mulindafwa in Malawi, and Kulonga, Vinkhakanimba and Zengani in Zambia which serve as points for performance, transmission and celebration of Tumbuka identity.

== Background ==
Tumbuka dance and festival traditions encompass social entertainment, historical commemoration, healing and spiritual mediation. In northern Malawi, Vimbuza belongs to the broader Central and Southern African ng'oma (“drums of affliction”) complex that uses drumming, song and dance to diagnose and treat illness and to restore social balance. Beyond ritual forms, twentieth-century military history influenced male dance genres such as Malipenga/Mganda, which adapt parade style aesthetics introduced under the King's African Rifles.

== Major traditional dances ==
=== Vimbuza ===
Vimbuza is a therapeutic performance tradition in which drumming, singing and dance facilitate diagnosis and treatment of spirit-related illness. UNESCO notes its historical depth, gendered participation (with many patients being women), spirit-specific drum rhythms and its persistence despite missionary and biomedical opposition. Scholarly work situates Vimbuza within ng'oma healing and details trance states, the role of specialist healers and the social “space to dance the disease”.

=== Malipenga (Mapenenga) ===
Malipenga (also rendered locally as Mapenenga) emerged among northern communities especially among Tumbuka sub groups in the early twentieth century, translating military style into competitive dance with “singing horns” and regimented formations. From the north it spread widely; in central Malawi a related variant named Mganda developed, sharing style-based choreography and group display.

=== Mtungo (Magali) ===
Mtungo, also called Magali, is a traditional dance from the Nkhamanga and Hewe of Rumphi, Kasungu, and Mzimba districts. It is performed by men and women at beer gatherings; songs are often educative. The principal instrument is a small-mouthed gourd partially filled with pebbles; performers modulate sound by alternately covering and uncovering the opening while shaking, accompanying singing and hand-clapping.

=== Ulumba ===
Ulumba is a men’s celebratory dance in Rumphi formed on the return of a successful hunter. The choreography stages a mock confrontation in which villagers mimic a charging animal while the hunter enacts its dispatch, to choral singing and clapping.

=== Visekese ===
Visekese (closely related to Chiwoda) is a women’s shaker-box dance found across parts of Northern Malawi and popularised by performers from the Tumbuka Usisya area of Nkhata Bay. The name refers to the principal instrument, a thin, book-sized wooden box filled with pebbles or dry grains that rattle when shaken for rhythmic effect.

== Festivals ==
=== Gonapamuhanya ===
Gonapamuhanya is the principal Tumbuka cultural festival in Malawi, held in the Nkhamanga area of Rumphi District, commemorating Gonapamhanya, the first Chikulamayembe to settle where the chieftaincy is now centered (Bolero). The event features historical recitations, recognition of the Chikulamayembe lineage and displays of traditional dances. Coverage in the Malawian press highlights its role in cultural preservation and venue changes in recent years.

=== Mulindafwa ===
Mulindafwa is observed by the Tumbuka of Hewe (Rumphi) and commemorates the migration and settlement of the ancestor Themba Katumbi. Ceremonies include recounting lineage history and display of a symbolic stone associated with Katumbi’s ascent of Themba Hill.

=== Kulonga (Zambia) ===
In Zambia’s Eastern Province (Lundazi, Chasefu, and Lumezi), the Kulonga Traditional Ceremony is an annual harvest festival under Chief Mphamba. Public information emphasises its food-security symbolism and communal performances of music and dance.

=== Vinkhakanimba (Muyombe, Zambia) ===
Vinkhakanimba (also written as Vikamkanimba) is celebrated by Tumbuka under Senior Chief Muyombe (Mafinga District, Muchinga Province). Official notices describe it as commemorating migration narratives and promoting unity, with performances including Mganda and other local genres.

=== Zengani (Chasefu/Lundazi, Zambia) ===
Zengani is held annually (typically the first weekend of October) for Tumbuka- and Ngoni-speaking communities of Chasefu, Lundazi and Lumezi. Academic work documents its name’s meaning (“to build/together”), venue (Emusa, Chasefu) and programme of dances such as Ingoma, Vimbuza, Mganda and Chiwoda, with an explicit aim of fostering unity.

== Performance practice and instrumentation ==
Across genres, Tumbuka dance ensembles typically combine call-and-response vocals with polyrhythmic drumming and hand-clapping. Ritual traditions such as Vimbuza use spirit-specific drum patterns on ng’oma drums; entertainment forms add idiophones such as gourd shakers (Mtungo) or shaker boxes (Visekese), while Malipenga/Mganda incorporate “singing horns” and parade formations derived from military drill.

== Cultural significance and continuity ==
These dances and festivals function as living repositories of Tumbuka history and identity, providing frameworks for healing, socialization and intergenerational transmission. Contemporary organizers and sponsors promote festivals as spaces for cultural safeguarding and youth engagement, while performers adapt choreographies for civic events and media.

== See also ==
- Tumbuka people
- Culture of Malawi
- Culture of Zambia
- Vimbuza
