= Zengani =

Annual unity ceremony of Tumbuka people and Tumbuka-speaking Ngoni people of Zambia

Zengani Traditional Ceremony
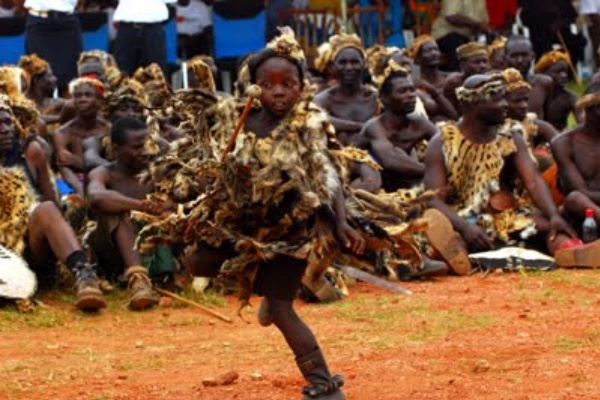
- Zengani Traditional Dance
- Genre: Traditional dance
- Frequency: Annual (October)
- Locations: Lundazi, Chasefu and Lumezi Districts, Eastern Province

Zengani is an annual cultural event held in October by Tumbuka people and Tumbuka-speaking Ngoni communities in districts of Zambia’s Eastern Province of Lundazi, Chasefu and Lumezi Districts. The name “Zengani” is a Chitumbuka word that translates to "solidify" and the event signifies unity and togetherness, bringing together the two tribal groups under a shared cultural celebration.

== History ==
Zengani began in 1898 in what is now Zambia. The ceremony features performances of traditional dances such as ingoma, Vimbuza, Mganda, chiwoda, Fwemba. It is attended by local chiefs, including Chiefs Phikamalaza, Mphamba, Kapichila, Mwasemphangwe, Katumba, Nzamane, Madzimawe, Mbango’ombe, and others, underscoring its communal and inter-chiefdom significance.

Community and national leaders also participate. In 2018, the Minister of Chiefs and Traditional Affairs and the Russian Ambassador to Zambia have been reported in attendance. At the same event, Chief Mazimawe was commended for his efforts against child marriage, highlighting the role of the ceremony in addressing social issues alongside cultural traditions.

Academic studies explain how both the Tumbuka and Ngoni communities participate in shared rituals, dancing to Tumbuka-language songs that have helped unite the groups under a single cultural identity over generations.
