= Tumbuka =

Tumbuka may refer to:

- Tumbuka people, a Bantu people of eastern Zambia, Malawi and Tanzania
  - Tumbuka language, their Bantu language
  - Tumbuka mythology, their mythology
