= NyaGo =

Musical artist from Malawi

- Also known as: Lucy Chimwemwe Trizah Titus Gondwe
- Born: Blantyre
- Origin: Rumphi District, Malawi
- Genres: Ethno-spiritual, gospel, Afro-soul, Vimbuza fusion
- Occupations: Singer, songwriter, activist
- Years active: 2013–present

Lucy Gondwe, born 04.11.1986 (known as Trizah Titus and later NyaGo) is a Malawian Afro-spiritual singer, songwriter, and activist. She fuses traditional Vimbuza healing rhythms of the Tumbuka people with gospel, house, and contemporary African music. Her autobiographical work and public performances address themes of survival, migration, and spiritual transformation. According to her Social Media Accounts Gondwe left Africa in June 2024 to travel to Italy and all over Europe to collaborate with people from Italy, Denmark, Germany and France and finally settled in Germany. She has two daughters living in Malawi. According to her Social Media accounts in 2025 she is now a legal german citizan able to vote in Germany.and meanwhile lives in her own house.

== Early life ==
Gondwe was born in Blantyre, Malawi. In her autobiographical account, she describes growing up in a family of five children in northern Malawi, including in Rumphi District under extremely hard an traumatic circumstances.

In her memoir, Gondwe states that, as a child, her father took her, her mother and her siblings to Swaziland and subjected to forced labour and physical abuse. She writes that she and her siblings, Ovyce, Emma, Linda, and Lumbani, experienced severe deprivation, physical punishment, and repeated sexual abuse while living under constant control and threats. According to her account, the family was later rescued after her mother Mirriam disclosed their circumstances during a hospital stay, prompting reports to an orphanage, a christian church, and the police, followed by an investigation lasting over a year.

Following her return to Malawi, Gondwe alleges that she experienced poverty, instability, and gender-based violence while living in different family environments. She has also linked her early exposure to spiritual healing practices such as Vimbuza to her later artistic identity.

Her memoir claims her adolescence as marked by sexual violence, a teenage pregnancy, and community pressure that, according to her account, preceded an early forced marriage. In a later interview with Malawi24, Gondwe also stated that she had been sexually harassed by a teacher during her school years, a claim not included in her memoir.

The abuse and boundary violations she describes in her book are presented as continuing throughout later stages of her life and as a key motivation for her subsequent advocacy for women’s rights as her later partners - she assumed on Social Media - were basically abusive.

Overall, it can be summarized that, according to her book as well as her statements on social media and in interviews:

Actual sexual assaults (done, estimated 18–30 incidents): villagers, boy after the netball game, school teacher, training friend, employer’s partner, music manager, husband, later partner, friend in the park, older foreign man that financially supported her,

Attempted assaults (attempted, estimated 7–15 incidents): uncle, travel companion, man in a car, client with a weapon, older employer, business partner, book publisher.

Lumbani Titus Gondwe is a musician as well, also known a Shaba.

== Career ==
Gondwe began performing under the name Trizah Titus, releasing four gospel albums between 2013 and 2019: Tsika Mzimu Woyera (2013), Yesu Wakwiza (2015), Ndendende (2017), and Umoza (2019).

In 2020, she rebranded as "NyaGo" to reflect a more spiritually conscious and culturally rooted direction. Her music manager until August 2022 was Qabaniso Malewezi. Her music and performance integrates indigenous rituals, rhythms, spiritual chanting, and storytelling. These rituals may include animal sacrifice and the ritual drinking of fresh blood, including from a chicken, as she told in an interview for Makosana 2024.

She has performed across Southern Africa, including at the "Wikiendi Live" festival in Tanzania, the Goethe Institute Tanzania with Tres Testosterones and the Pamoja Zanzibar Festival.

NyaGo is an outspoken advocate for survivors of gender-based violence (GBV). She uses her experience to raise awareness and to support affected women and children. In 2021, she was appointed ambassador for a GBV and mental health campaign by the organization Lifest.

In 2024, Gondwe published ENOUGH! Unveiling My Shadows, a memoir that recounts her life from childhood trauma as childslave and abuse through resilience, escape, and spiritual growth. The book combines autobiographical storytelling with themes of inner healing, faith, and cultural reflection.

NyaGo’s musical style is described as ethno-spiritual or Afro-healing music. She combines traditional Malawian instruments and tonalities with contemporary vocal techniques and multilingual lyrics in Tumbuka, Chichewa, and English. Her sound has drawn comparisons to Malawian jazz pioneer Wambali Mkandawire.

== Discography ==
As Trizah Titus:

- Tsika Mzimu Woyera (2013)
- Yesu Wakwiza (2015)
- Ndendende (2017)
- Umoza (2019)

As NyaGo:

- Mdoko, Single (2021)
- Mizimu (Ancestors) (2024)
- Lass es los, Single (2025)
- Kamzyanga, Single (2025)
- Chingaba Wuli, Single (2025)
- Bible, Single (2024)
