= Vinkhakanimba =

Zambian cultural festival

- Status: Active
- Genre: Cultural festival
- Frequency: Annually
- Locations: Muyombe, Mafinga District, Muchinga Province, Zambia
- Participants: Tumbuka people(Henga/Muyombe chiefdom)
- Patron: Senior Chief Muyombe
- Sponsors: Government of Zambia

Vinkhakanimba (also spelled Vikamkanimba, Vinkakanimba or Vinkhamkanimba) is an annual cultural festival of the Tumbuka people held under the authority of Senior Chief Muyombe in and around Muyombe, Mafinga District, Muchinga Province, Zambia. The ceremony features traditional dance performances, speeches by traditional authorities and invited officials, and public celebrations related to Tumbuka identity in Zambia’s north-east.

== History ==
The Vinkhakanimba began in the early 17th century after the Tumbuka people started expanding out of Nkhamanga Kingdom. The dance is performed by Tumbuka people of Mafinga and parts of Isoka District.

=== Spellings ===
The festival name appears in several spellings such as Vinkhakanimba, Vikamkanimba, Vinkakanimba and Vinkhamkanimba in local media and event listings. Government and cultural listings recognize the celebration under Senior Chief Muyombe, and music-culture directories note the variant Vikamkanimba in reference to the same event in Muyombe.

== Location, timing and hosts ==
Vinkhakanimba is hosted by the Muyombe chiefdom in Mafinga District. Official communications and event coverage place the main arena in or near Muyombe, with the ceremony typically scheduled in late August or during September, depending on local arrangements. Live coverages by local broadcasters and community media have streamed the event from Mafinga District in recent editions.

=== Programme and performances ===
The ceremony programme commonly includes processions by traditional leaders, salutations to Senior Chief Muyombe, and a slate of dance performances by troupes drawn from the Tumbuka-speaking area. Genres frequently showcased include mganda/mapenenga and other regional styles, accompanied by drumming and call-and-response singing. Broadcast and social-media coverage regularly shows arena performances, community delegations, and visiting groups from neighbouring chiefdoms.

== Cultural significance ==
For communities of the Muyombe chiefdom and the wider Tumbuka-speaking region, Vinkhakanimba functions is claimed to be a cultural transmission, public recognition of traditional authority, and community solidarity. Provincial authorities have described the ceremony as a platform for civic messaging, public health sensitisation and cultural preservation in Mafinga District.

== Recent editions ==
In recent years, the ceremony has been publicly streamed by regional broadcasters and community pages, documenting the arrival of Senior Chief Muyombe and performances by invited groups. Coverage identifies the event site in Mafinga District and shows attendance by neighbouring chiefs and delegations.

== Relationship to other Tumbuka festivals ==
Within Zambia, Vinkhakanimba is one of several Tumbuka-linked annual ceremonies alongside Kulonga Traditional Ceremony (Lundazi District) and Zengani (Chasefu/Lundazi area), which similarly serve as venues for dance, cultural display and inter-community exchange.

== See also ==
- Tumbuka people
