= Gonapamuhanya festival =

Annual Tumbuka cultural festival in Malawi

Gonapamhanya festival
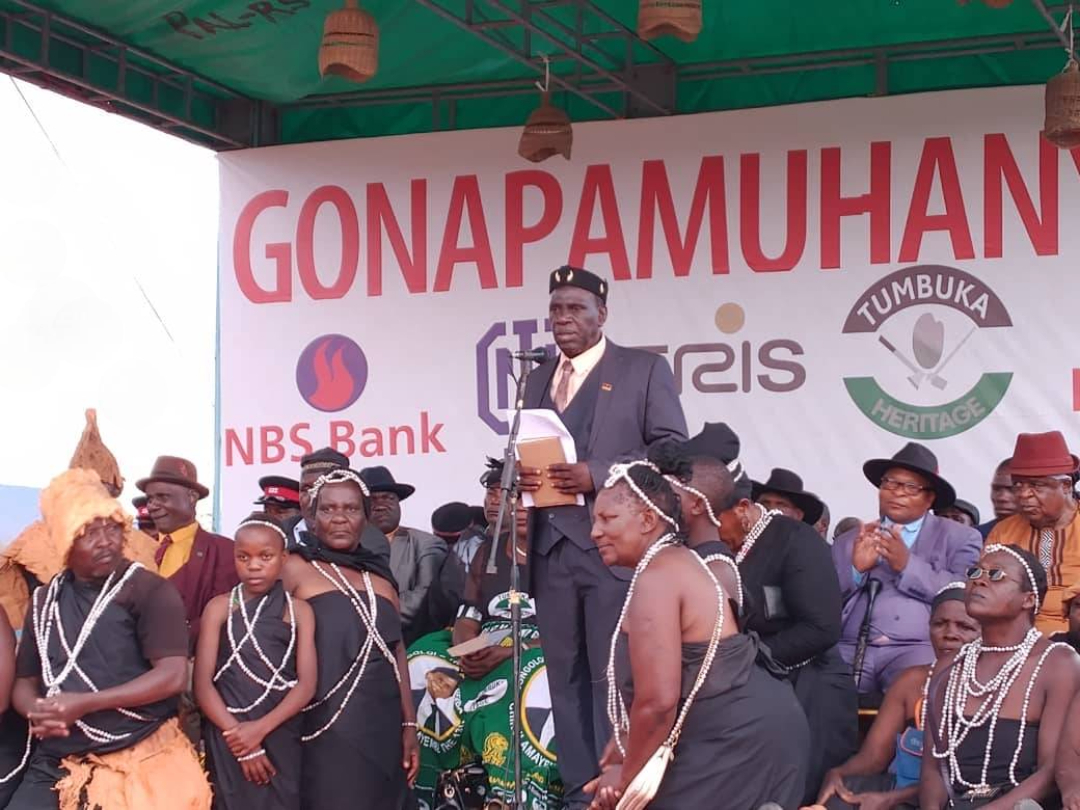
- The Gonapamuhanya festival of the Tumbuka people in 2025 took place in Malawi
- Genre: Cultural heritage
- Frequency: Annually
- Locations: Bolero (Kadumuliro Cultural Site), Rumphi District, Northern Malawi
- Most recent: October 5, 2024

The Gonapamhanya festival is an annual cultural festival held by the Tumbuka people in Rumphi District, Northern Malawi. The festival commemorates Gonapamhanya, the first Chikulamayembe (paramount chief) to settle in Bolero, where the Tumbuka chieftaincy is centered today. It typically occurs in September or October and is rooted in Tumbuka history and identity.

== Historical background ==
The ceremony honors Gonapamhanya's legacy, explaining his role as the founding leader of the Chikulamayembe dynasty, established without warfare but through peaceful settlement and beneficial traits. The name "Chikulamayembe" is said to originate from a Swahili phrase meaning "take a hoe," symbolizing the tools he brought that earned him leadership among the Tumbuka.

== Location and changes ==
Traditionally held at Bolero, the ceremony has more recently been staged at the Kadumuliro Cultural Site to accommodate growing attendance and to establish a permanent cultural heritage location for the Tumbuka people.

== Activities and symbolism ==
The ceremony includes historical recitations, traditional dances, displays of Tumbuka heritage, and communal feasting. The climax features the arrival of the Paramount Chief, who may be carried in procession, sometimes on an ox-cart or vehicle to the ceremonial grounds, greeted by ululations and chants of praise.

== Attendance and cultural significance ==
The festival regularly draws Malawi's presidents and high-ranking government officials, along with traditional leaders and dignitaries, conveying its role in cultural preservation and national unity.

== Social challenges and governance ==
The 2017 edition of the ceremony witnessed tensions when political parties sought to exploit the gathering. In response, organizers have discouraged attendees from wearing political party regalia to preserve the event's cultural neutrality. In 2022 the new Paramount Chief Chikulamayembe Joseph Bongololo Gondwe was installed by the President Lazurus in 2022 in Bolero. The 60 year old was installed at Bolero Community Ground where tight security was required as a rival's supporters were protesting. The protests included damaging cars and removing electricity lines.

The highlight of the 2025 festival was to unveiling of a tombstone to Chikulamayembe I who founded the dynasty. The festival, however, was the site of fighting between supporters of Gondwe and those who thought that Mtima Gondwe, the son of the previous king, was the rightful chief. One group argued that they supported the rightful heir to be King. Tear gas was used to control the crowd.
