= Nyika people =

Tumbuka subgroup in southeastern Africa

ŴaNyika / Wenya

Total population
- 120, 000

Regions with significant populations
- Northern Malawi, Eastern Zambia, Southwestern Tanzania

Languages
- Tumbuka

Religion
- Traditional beliefs, Christianity

Related ethnic groups
- Tumbuka, Lambya, Wandya, Fungwe, Yombe

Nyika people (also known as the Wenya) are a sub ethnic group of the Tumbuka people inhabiting the highland areas between northern Malawi and northeastern Zambia. They are remnants of the Nkhamanga people and are among the culturally related groups that form part of the broader Tumbuka cluster in the region.

== History ==
The Nyika origins start with the Kalonga wa Nkhonde of the Tumbuka group in the pre-1800 period. A section of the Kalonga group left its original settlements and moved westward, eventually occupying mountainous areas between Kalonga and the Isoka–Nakonde corridor in what is now northern Malawi and Zambia.

Ethnographer W. V. Brelsford classified the Nyika together with the Tambo, Wandya, Wenya, Fungwe, Lambya, and Yombe as “Tumbuka speaking” peoples, describing them as descended from a common ancestral stock that became distinct ethnic groups due to geographical separation in a mountainous region.

== Relation to the Tumbuka ==
The Nyika (Wenya) were among six small groups that entered Tumbuka territory from the north-west before 1800. These included the Tambo, Wandya, Lambya, Fungwe, and Yombe. Over the centuries, the Nyika and related groups adopted the Tumbuka language and culture, integrating with the demographically dominant Tumbuka population. The degree of cultural and linguistic assimilation was greater in frontier areas, while groups further away retained partial distinctiveness.

== Language and culture ==
The Nyika speak dialects intelligible with Tumbuka and share many cultural traits with their neighbours, including social organisation, initiation customs, and traditional leadership structures. They are often regarded as part of the broader Tumbuka cultural and linguistic continuum.

== See also ==
- Tumbuka people
- Lambya people
