= Chasefu District =

- District
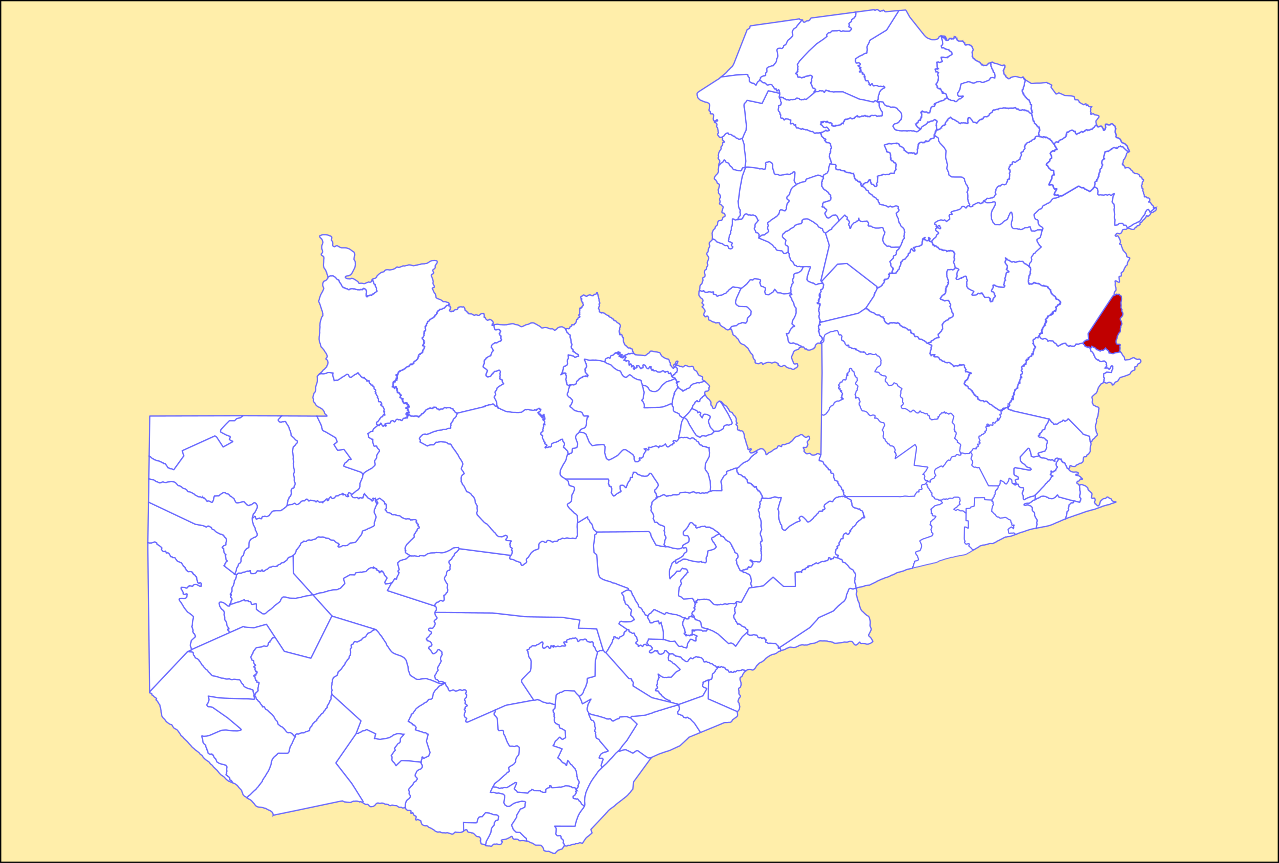
- District location in Zambia
- Country: Zambia
- Province: Eastern Province
- Capital: Chasefu

Area
  - Total: 2,916 km^{2} (1,126 sq mi)

Population (2022)
  - Total: 131,160
  - Density: 44.98/km^{2} (116.5/sq mi)
- Time zone: UTC+2 (CAT)

Chasefu District is a district of Eastern Province, Zambia. It was made independent from Lundazi District in 2018. As of the 2022 Zambian Census, the district had a population of 131,160 people. The district is inhabited by the Tumbuka people. Chitumbuka is the predominant language spoken in the district.
