= Bolero, Rumphi =

Place in Northern Malawi

Bolero
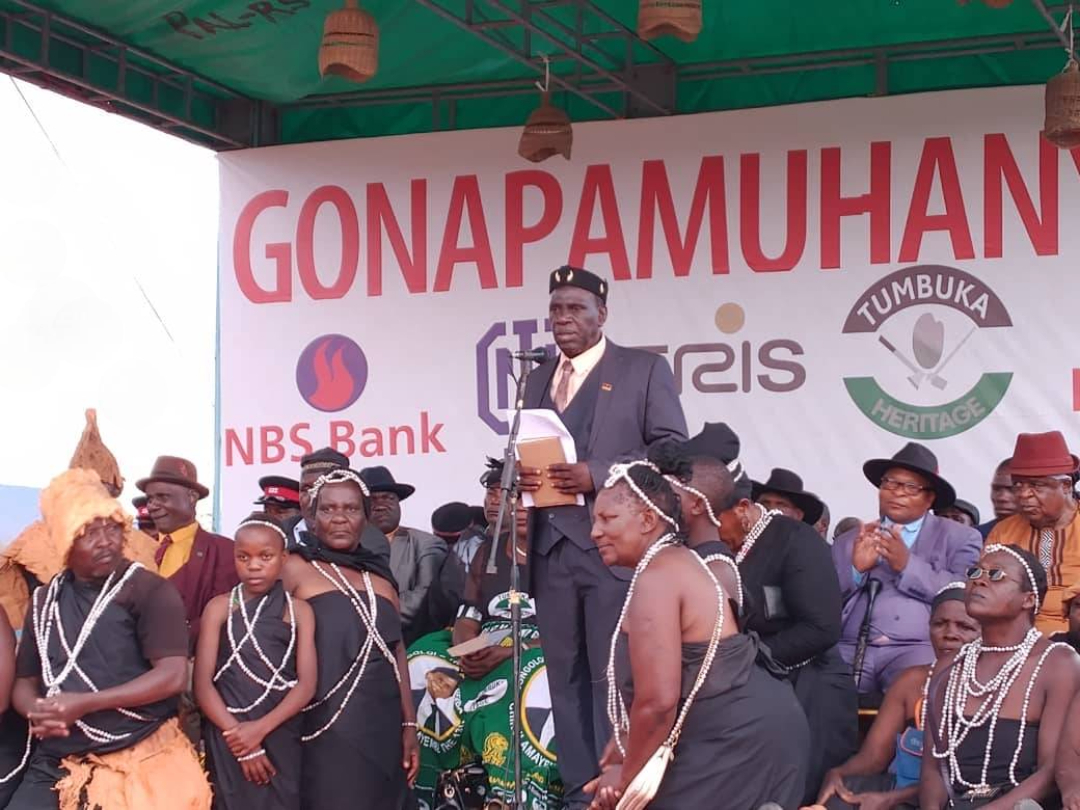
- The Gonapamuhanya Annual Cultural Festival in Bolero, 2025
- Interactive map of Bolero
- Coordinates: 10°58′52″S 33°44′27″E
- Region: Northern Region
- District: Rumphi District

Bolero is a settlement in the Rumphi District (Rumphi Boma) in the Northern Region of Malawi. It is the traditional home of the Paramount Chief of the Tumbuka people and the site of the Gonapamuhanya festival, an annual celebration of Tumbuka culture.

== History ==
Bolero hosts the annual Gonapamuhanya festival to celebrate the arrival of the first Tumbuka king, Gonapamuhanya, from Tanzania in 1780. The festival is a celebration of Tumbuka culture.

The Kamanga dialect of Tumbuka is spoken around Bolero and Hewe. The Kamanga dialect is closely tied to the former Nkhamanga Kingdom and is considered one of the oldest Tumbuka dialects. It survives in Bolero but is heavily influenced by the standard form of Tumbuka.

In 2014, the American Ambassador to Malawi, Virginia E. Palmer, released $6,000 from the Ambassador's Special Self-Help Fund to fund a new library for the secondary school in Bolero.

In 2018 Chief Chikulamayembe died and was buried here. His funeral was attended by the President Mutharika and his estranged vice-President Chilima.

In 2022, the new Paramount Chief Chikulamayembe Joseph Bongololo Gondwe was installed by President Lazarus Chakwera in 2022 in Bolero. The highlight of the 2025 festival held here was the unveiling of a tombstone to Chikulamayembe I, who founded the dynasty.

== Description ==
Bolero has a rural hospital, eight bore holes, a primary school and two secondary schools. Minister of Education Madalitso Wirima visited the largest secondary school in July 2025 to see the exams taking place. Aaron Kaunda, the headteacher, noted the shortage of houses for the teachers and that there were only 200 desks for 500 pupils. The second secondary school is Jalira Girls Secondary, which opened in 2024. As of then, it had about 100 pupils and offered additional subjects including design, music and art. It was the eighth secondary school for girls nationally. Wirima said more were being built. Jalira was opened by the First Lady Monica Chakwera.

The road from Rumphi to Bolero was considered to be only crossable by four-wheel-drive vehicles in 1979 due to the black soil in the Nkhamanga Valley. A road was constructed in 2020 but it was substantially damaged due to rain in 2022.

== Governance ==
Bolero is part of the Rumphi Central Constituency. In 2025 Enock Chakufwa Chihana was elected but he was promoted to second vice President. In the by-election that followed Dr. Mathews Mtumbuka of the United Transformation Movement was elected.
