= Mpoto language =

Bantu language of Tanzania

Mpoto
- Chimpoto
- Native to: Tanzania
- Region: Ruvuma
- Ethnicity: Mpoto
- Native speakers: (80,000 cited 1977)
- Language family: Niger–Congo?: Atlantic–Congo; Benue–Congo; Bantoid; Bantu; Rufiji–Ruvuma; Mbinga; Ruhuhu (South); Mpoto

Language codes
- ISO 639-3: mpa
- Glottolog: mpot1240
- Guthrie code: N.14
- Linguasphere: 99-AUS-rb

Mpoto is a Bantu language of Tanzania related and similar to Chitumbuka language.
