= Mganda =

Traditional Malawian dance of the Tumbuka and related groups

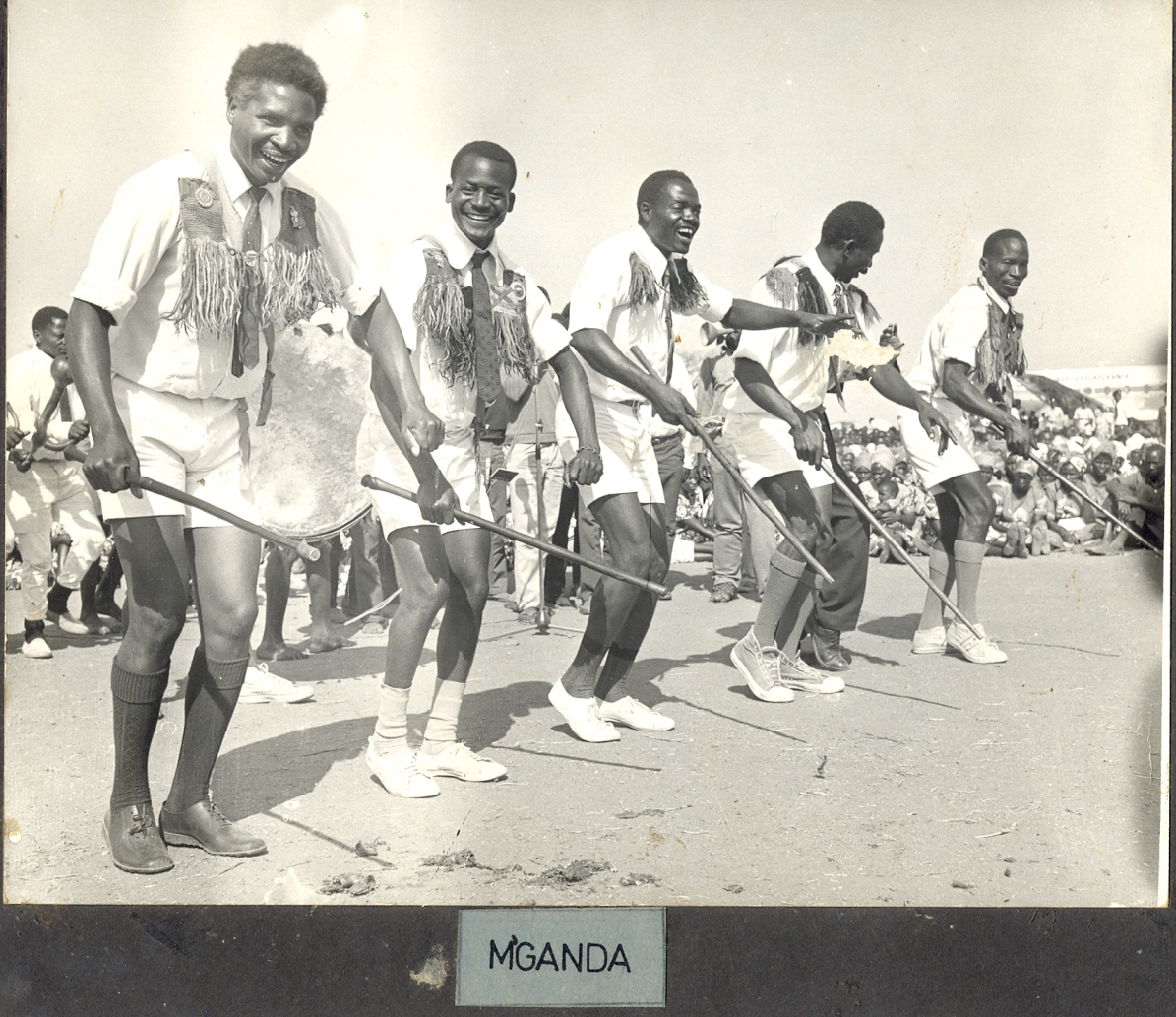
- Dancers performing Mganda.
- Native name: Mganda ukulu
- Etymology: From Chitumbuka word "ganda" meaning to "thump with feet".
- Genre: Traditional dance
- Instrument(s): Drums, whistles
- Inventor: Tumbuka people (ethnic group)
- Year: 20th Century
- Origin: Northern Malawi
- Related dances: Vimbuza

Mganda is a traditional dance originated and performed by the Tumbuka people in Malawi and parts of eastern Zambia and southern Tanzania. The dance is known for its militaristic moves and rhythms. Other ethnic groups have copied the dance.

== Etymology ==
The name Mganda is derived from a Chitumbuka language word that means to "thump with feet" from the root word "ganda".

== History ==
Mganda started in the early 20th century, influenced by military drills introduced by African soldiers returning from service in World War I and by colonial-era regimental parades.

The dance began with the Tumbuka people before it spread to various groups such as the Ngoni, Henga, Phoka and Chewa, and to some other countries.

== Performance ==
Mganda performances are typically held during celebrations, weddings, political events, and national holidays. The Mganda troupe usually consists of a lead drummer who sets the rhythm, a whistle blower who signals transitions and dancers arranged in coordinated lines performing synchronized steps. The dancers may number from 6-20.

Performers usually wear uniforms, berets, or hats of military attire.

== See also ==
- Vimbuza
