= Tumbuka mythology =

Ethnic group living in Malawi, Zambia, and Tanzania

The Tumbuka are an ethnic group living in Malawi, Zambia and Tanzania. In Tumbuka mythology, Chiuta ("Great Bow") is the supreme creator, symbolised in the sky by the rainbow, and is approached through a wider hierarchy of spirits that Tumbuka cosmology sets out in some detail.

Tumbuka mythology is carried mainly through myths and folktales, traditionally told around a fire at night to the accompaniment of drumming and choral response; these stories aim to entertain as much as to teach children moral behaviour. Much of this repertoire has thinned since the mid-twentieth century as rural life has changed, though a good deal survives; these vidokoni (stories) still carry a moral.

Three animals recur more than any others: fulu (the tortoise), kalulu (the hare) and chimbwi (the hyena). Fulu is generally the wisest of the three, chimbwi the greedy villain, and kalulu the clever trickster and manipulator who can usually outwit everyone except fulu.

== Cosmology ==
Tumbuka traditional religion sets the high god at the head of a graded hierarchy of intermediaries reaching down to the living and, below them, to the dead. One detailed account of this system, compiled from the recollections of Tumbuka elders around Livingstonia by the Presbyterian theologian Stephen Kauta Msiska, describes six ranked levels: the high God (Chauta, Chiuta, Mulungu or Mulengi); the higher spirits (vipiri, called agogo further south); the ancestors' spirits (mizimu); the priests or ritual leaders (basofi); the people on earth (bantu); and, beneath the earth, the dwelling place of the dead (malo gha bakufwa). Prayers pass upward through this chain: a person's needs go to the basofi, who convey them to the mizimu, who forward them to the vipiri, who in turn carry them to Chiuta, believed to answer with rain, food, children, health, success in war and peace. The rest of this section draws heavily on that one account, and should be read as one theologian's systematisation of oral testimony rather than a settled scholarly consensus.

=== Chiuta ===
Chiuta is the supreme deity figure in the traditional religions of the Tumbuka people of present-day Malawi. Chiuta is also known by the names Mulengi, Mwenco and Wamtatakuya. Further names recorded around Livingstonia include Kyala, Mbanda and Mbepomwikemo ("God-spirit-wind"); Chiuta/Chauta itself is explained as a compound of uta, "bow", with the augmentative prefix chi- that in Chitumbuka marks something extraordinarily large or powerful. A small bow is kauta and an ordinary one uta; the greatest of all bows, the rainbow, is Chiuta.

Chiuta is omnipresent, though shapeless. Prayers can be made directly to Chiuta, but ancestors and spirits play a large part in determining whether these prayers are fulfilled, and offerings and appeals to them can help sway their favour. Chiuta is associated with natural phenomena that come from the sky, such as rain and thunderstorms. In this same account, the Creator is unapproachable and too remote even for the recently dead to reach directly, so people addressed him only through the chain of ancestors and higher spirits described above, much as a villager would approach a chief only through a messenger and counsellor, never directly.

Chiuta is also the name used for the supreme being in Chewa traditional religion, and names for God vary by region: Chiuta or Chauta in the north and south, Chisumphi, Mphambe or Nduna among the Chewa and Ngoni of the centre, Leza further afield. All these regions, however, agree in calling God Mulungu or Mulengi, "creator", which has been read as evidence of a shared monotheistic core beneath the regional variation in names.

=== Vipiri: the higher spirits ===
Below Chiuta stand the vipiri (singular chipiri; called agogo, singular gogo, in central and southern Malawi), understood as the spirits of earlier basofi or chiefs remembered for exemplary lives, who remain in communion with God and act as intermediaries for the mizimu beneath them. Tumbuka tradition attaches particular vipiri to particular places, clans or tribes, and describes relationships among them not unlike those among the living: the vipiri visit one another, marry, and sometimes fight. Chombe, the spirit associated with the Chombe area on the lakeshore, was said to have a wife, Chombe-Mwanakazi, living apart from him by the lake; when he travelled to join her, a heavy storm was said to mark the journey. Chombe was also said to have fought with a rival spirit, Chikhang'ombe, after Chombe's people killed one of Chikhang'ombe's own; thunder, lightning and storms outside the rainy season were read as signs of their continuing conflict, with Chikhang'ombe sometimes driving away rain that Chombe intended to send.

A long list of such territorial spirits, recognised across northern Malawi in the early twentieth century, has been recorded, each paired with the human musofi, or priest, who served it. Among them: Filawule at Karonga, Wovo (or Furu) at Fulirwa, Chitende at Deep Bay, Manchebe near Livingstonia, Wongwe at Mlowe, Phwezi in the Henga valley, Jerekere at Mhuju, Munguyi at Uzumara, Kampaba at Ng'onga, and Mwanda and Chikhang'ombe among the Hebe. Attached to the vipiri in the northern region were nchimi, diviners or soothsayers, usually women, who were said to prophesy while in an ecstatic state and whose pronouncements people acted on at once.

=== Mizimu and vibanda: ancestors and spirit doubles ===
The mizimu (singular muzimu) are the spirits of the dead, understood by the Tumbuka as departing the body at death to wander in remote places such as mountains, valleys and the bush; the spirits of chiefs and other prominent people were traditionally thought to return instead to the village, which is why some such figures were buried within it rather than away from it. This belief is distinguished from ancestor worship as such: Malawians historically worshipped Chiuta through the ancestors, as intermediaries, rather than worshipping the ancestors themselves.

A related but distinct category is the chibanda (plural vibanda), an entity understood as a kind of double of human society, perceptible to the living and distinguished by many Tumbuka speakers from the mizimu only with difficulty, if at all. Vibanda are described as calling a person by name without showing themselves, imitating the whistles herd boys use to call one another in the forest, or announcing their presence at a graveyard or in the mountains through the sound of a branch snapping; a person's hair is said to stand on end when a chibanda is near.

=== Basofi and traditional worship ===
The basofi (singular musofi) were priests or ritual leaders, often chiefs themselves, expected to live exemplary, sober lives while caring for their people's spiritual welfare; each worshipped God through named ancestors, who in turn appealed to the higher spirits above them. Traditional religion had no fixed weekly day of worship, but the musofi appointed rest days tied to harvest festivals and, especially in times of war, famine or disease, a day of atonement on which people brought gifts to the ancestors' spirits and confessed their wrongs in a call-and-response liturgy: the musofi's prayer that God, all-knowing, should sweep away hidden sin was met with the congregation's cry of Fya! ("Away!" — the same word used to chase birds from a rice field), and the musofi would go on to invoke the departed by name, urging the living not to conceal anything from them.

== Vimbuza spirit taxonomy ==
The spirits associated with the Vimbuza healing dance are classified by the Ngoni-Tumbuka into several distinct kinds, distinguished by their geographical origin, the character of the illness they cause, and the language in which they are said to speak. Three broad types are recognised: Vimbuza proper, of Bemba, Bisa and Senga origin, associated with fever-like pain, general body aches and loss of appetite; Virombo, of Chewa origin, associated with severe headaches and heart palpitations; and Vyanusi, of Ngoni origin, associated with a form of mental disturbance that, left untreated, was believed to lead to madness.

Individual Vimbuza spirits carry their own names, usually those of dead chiefs or notable figures from the Bemba, Bisa, Lunda and Senga peoples, among them Chota Muliro, Chanda, Chibesakunda, Chitimukulu, Jandalala, Mazabamba, Mwiza, Kafwimbi, Kakota, Kota, Kawuswe, Kazembe and Njekulala; each name is understood to cover a whole class of similar spirits rather than a single individual. Virombo spirits, by contrast, are typically named collectively rather than individually — as BaRondo, BaSenga, BaChewa, Mam'phanda, Mavundura, Makhabango and Ukhazi — while recognised Vyanusi spirits include Mngoma, Mhalule, Majelemani, and Mthwasi, a form of possession specifically associated with divination and healing. The therapeutic dance and drumming used to treat possession by these spirits, discussed in detail in the Vimbuza and Tumbuka people articles, was inscribed by UNESCO on the Representative List of the Intangible Cultural Heritage of Humanity in 2008.

== Legends ==
=== Creation of the universe ===
In the beginning, it is said, only the earth and Chiuta existed. The earth was empty, with no water on its surface, until Chiuta summoned the clouds, the rain and the lightning to fall upon it. Afterwards, Chiuta himself descended to earth, followed by the first humans and all the animals.

=== Origin of death ===
Several versions of how death entered the world are told about Chiuta and his messengers, all turning on a message that arrives too late or too slowly.

In the version recorded by Lynch and Roberts, Chiuta sent a chameleon to tell humanity that they would be reincarnated after death, while a lizard was sent with the opposite message, that death would be final. The lizard, being faster, arrived first, and death has been permanent ever since.

A version collected among the Tumbuka of Mzimba and Rumphi districts places the story before Chiuta's involvement is even needed: two old men held up the earth, one at the point of sunrise and the other at sunset, so that people would not die, but grew tired of the labour and resolved to settle the matter with a single race. The elder at sunrise sent a chameleon with the promise that people would live forever; the elder at sunset sent a lizard with the news that people would die. The lizard, arriving first and exhausted from the journey, delivered its message before the chameleon could arrive with his, and once given, the message could not be taken back.

A related, more explicitly theological version traces the world's present state under a curse to the same failure: the chameleon, entrusted with word from the Creator, was too slow to deliver it, and death entered the world as a consequence.

A different, unrelated tradition, recorded by Harvey, instead explains death and separation from the divine through human agency rather than a messenger's failure. In this account, the connection between heaven and earth, represented by the sky, was severed when humans discovered fire. The animals, afraid of what humans could now do, appealed to Chiuta for help; Chiuta settled the dispute, but, exhausted by the conflict, withdrew to the heavens and cut the link between earth and sky.

== Trickster and etiological tales ==
Alongside its central myths, Tumbuka oral tradition includes a wide range of shorter animal tales, most of them explaining some feature of the natural world or a lesson about honesty, gratitude and friendship, and recorded from fieldwork among Chitumbuka speakers of Mzimba and Rumphi districts.

In one tale, a tiny bird named Titi befriends a lion, who repeatedly gives him medicine that transforms him first into a cat, then a leopard, then a lion himself, on condition that he never claim credit for his own kills; when Titi finally breaks the agreement after killing a buffalo unshared, the lion strips him of his power and he reverts to being a small bird, forever confined to eating insects.

Two separate tales account for the tortoise's cracked shell. In one, an elephant strands a tortoise up a tree out of spite; a passing hyena refuses to help, but a leopard rescues him and admires his markings, and the grateful tortoise recolours the leopard's spots black and white. When the hyena, jealous of the leopard's new beauty, demands the same treatment, the tortoise deliberately colours his spots badly instead. This, the story concludes, is why the hyena's coat remains dull while the leopard's is striking; the tortoise's own shell, cracked in an unrelated fall from the tree, dates from the same episode. In the second version, the tortoise disguises himself as a bird with the help of a crow so that he can attend a feast held in the sky; unable to fly home afterwards, he asks the crow to have his wife prepare a soft landing, but the crow maliciously tells her to pile up rocks instead, and the tortoise's shell has been scarred ever since he threw himself down onto them.

Another tale explains why dogs no longer have horns: dogs and goats, the story goes, were once equally horned and quarrelled constantly over which of them their owner valued more, until a fight broke out in which the dog knocked out some of the goat's teeth and the goat, in turn, broke off the dog's horns, leaving dogs hornless and goats gap-toothed to this day. A separate tale accounts for why lions attack people only at close quarters: a lion, hunting alongside a human friend, is astonished to see the man kill a buffalo from a distance with a gun, but later watches the same man collapse in pain from a thorn in his foot, and concludes that a creature so easily hurt by something small and close should only be attacked at close range, never from afar.

Kalulu the hare appears as the archetypal trickster in a cluster of stories. In one, hunger drives Kalulu and a wild dog to steal beans from a garden together; each time it is the dog's turn to guard the cooking pot, Kalulu sneaks off, disguises himself with an eerie song to frighten the dog away, and eats the beans alone, until the suspicious dog secretly follows him, discovers the trick, and ends their friendship by hiding Kalulu's disguise so that it shrinks in the sun. In another, Kalulu and a tortoise repeatedly trick each other over ownership of a bag of food and, later, of Kalulu's own tail, each time putting the dispute to the village elders, who rule based only on who is physically holding the object. The result is that the tortoise wins the tail outright, and it is cut off and given to him.

The hyena, chimbwi, is cast as the greedy villain of the group in a tale in which a lion accompanies his friend the hyena to visit a prospective bride. Along the way, the hyena repeatedly slips off under the pretence of relieving himself, each time gorging on meat, chickens or goats he happens to find, and the lion grows steadily more suspicious. That night, after the marriage proposal is accepted and the household has gone to sleep, the hyena sneaks out again to slaughter goats from the family's own kraal; the resulting uproar exposes him, the couple are chased from the village, and the marriage never takes place.

== Moral and didactic tales ==
Beyond animal fables, Tumbuka folktales also address human conduct directly, and several are set against the historical background of migrant labour described in the Tumbuka people article. In one such tale, a spoiled boy named Kawezgera repeatedly humiliates his father by sending him on impossible errands, first to retrieve a snake Kawezgera claims to have lost, then a grasshopper that flies away the instant it is caught, while the father searches fruitlessly, singing songs asking the lost creatures to return; the tale is used to discuss the limits of a parent's patience and a child's respect for elders.

In "The Bird of Truth", three men from the same village leave together to work in the mines of Johannesburg; two spend their earnings on drink while the third, Malikande, saves carefully for his family. When the three set off home together, the two idle men, ashamed to return empty-handed, murder Malikande for his savings. A bird then appears on the road home and sings out, in Chitumbuka, exactly what they have done. They kill the bird and bury it, but it reappears and sings the same accusing song regardless, and the tale is used to teach that wrongdoing cannot ultimately be concealed.

A closely related, if less exuberantly told, body of moral folklore has also been documented among the Lakeside Tonga, close linguistic and cultural relatives of the Tumbuka in northern Malawi, whose oral literature likewise centres on using storytelling for moral education.

== Religious change: Christianity and syncretism ==
Malawi's 2018 census recorded 186,284 people nationally (1.1 percent of the population) as following a traditional religion, against 3,028,435 Roman Catholics, 2,498,969 members of the Church of Central Africa Presbyterian, 1,644,829 belonging to the SDA/Baptist/Apostolic tradition, and 2,426,754 Muslims, among other denominations. Because the Northern Region, where most Tumbuka live, has Malawi's highest concentration of Church of Central Africa Presbyterian membership, a legacy of the Livingstonia mission, this national figure for "traditional" religion likely understates how far belief in Chiuta, the ancestors and the vipiri continues to run alongside, rather than in place of, church membership; most Tumbuka today identify as Christian while still retaining these older beliefs and the folklore built around them.

This continuity is illustrated in a recollection recorded by a Presbyterian minister who combined pastoral work with sympathetic study of the traditional religion he had grown up with (his own career, including a clash with Malawi's one-party government over his teaching, is described in the Tumbuka people article): an elderly convert near Livingstonia, examined by the missionary Robert Laws in 1914, insisted that there had only ever been one Creator God, known to his own people long before missionaries arrived to name him.

== See also ==
- Tumbuka people
- Tumbuka language
- Vimbuza
- Chikulamayembe Dynasty
- Chewa traditional religion
