= Lumezi District =

- District
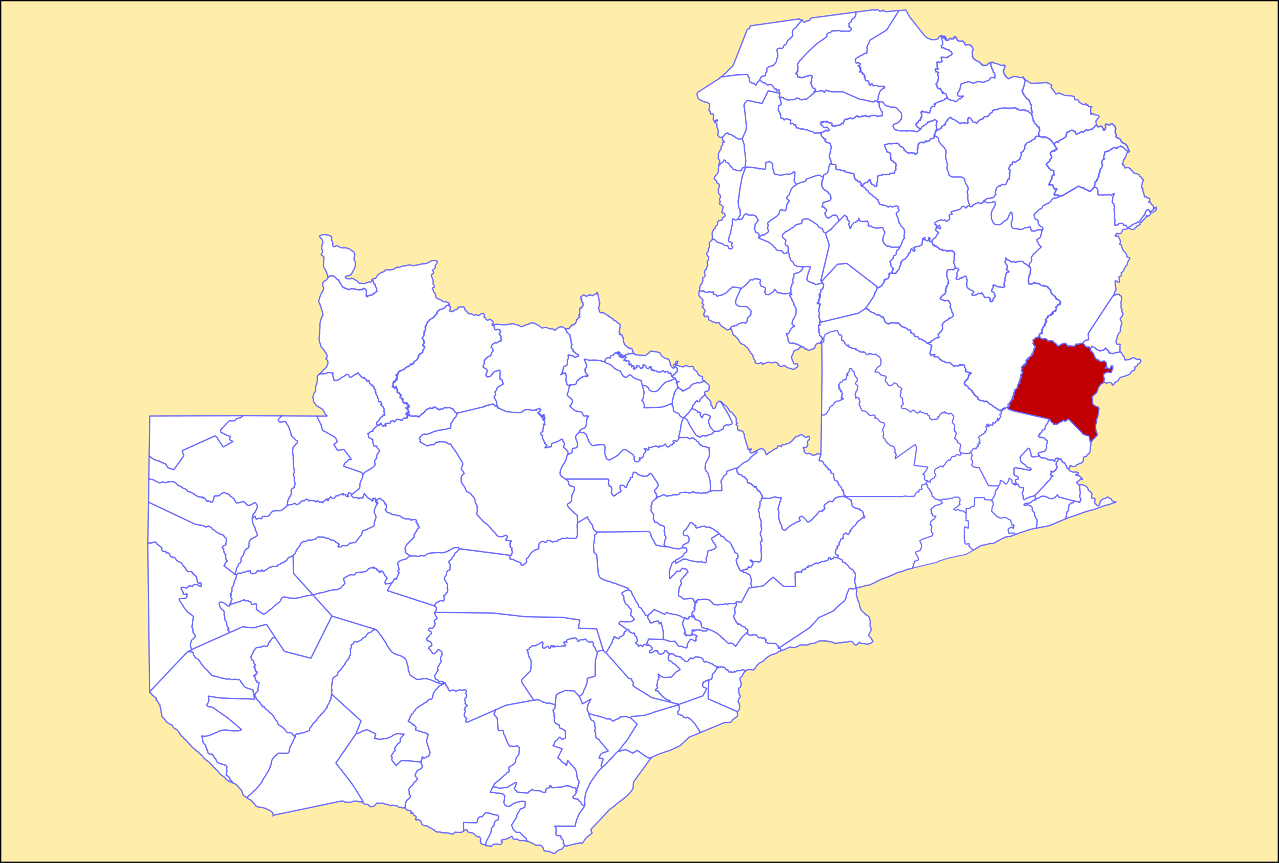
- District location in Zambia
- Country: Zambia
- Province: Eastern Province

Area
  - Total: 9,776.9 km^{2} (3,774.9 sq mi)

Population (2022)
  - Total: 158,971
  - Density: 16.260/km^{2} (42.113/sq mi)
- Time zone: UTC+2 (CAT)

Lumezi District is a district of Eastern Province, Zambia. It was made independent from Lundazi District in 2018. As of the 2022 Zambian Census, the district had a population of 158,971 people. Tumbuka is the predominant language spoken in the district.
