= Kulonga ceremony =

Annual harvest festival of the Tumbuka people in Zambia and Tanzania

Kulonga
- Genre: Cultural heritage; Harvest festival; Traditional ceremony
- Frequency: Annual (August)
- Locations: Lundazi District, Eastern Province, Zambia
- Inaugurated: 1890 AD
- Participants: Tumbuka people, Henga people

Kulonga is an annual harvest festival celebrated by the Tumbuka people in Lundazi District, Eastern Province, Zambia and Tanzania. The ceremony is presided over by Chief Mphamba and centers on the kulonga ritual, in which harvested foodstuffs are poured into baskets to symbolize thanksgiving, communal prosperity, and food security.

== History ==
The festival typically occurs in August and brings together communities for traditional dances, music, and cultural performances.

In 2024, the ceremony attracted national attention with the expected attendance of Zambian President Hakainde Hichilema, highlighting cultural and political significance.

Kulonga is part of a wider network of Tumbuka cultural festivals in Eastern Zambia, including Muganda, Zengani, and Vimbuza, all of which serve to preserve intergenerational traditions, promote community cohesion, and maintain the cultural heritage of the Tumbuka people.
