= Vimbuza =

Spirit-possession healing dance of the Tumbuka people

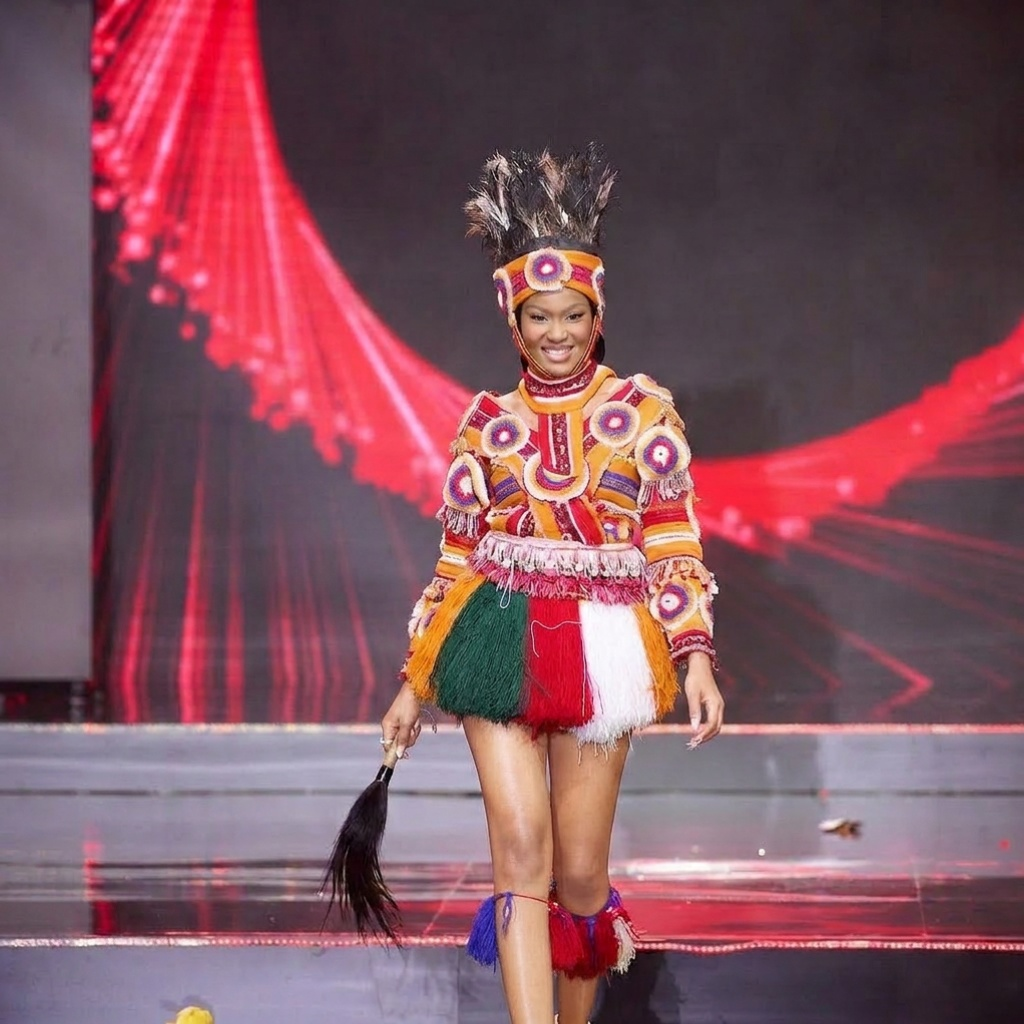
- A Tumbuka girl performs Vimbuza
- Native name: Gule wa Vimbuza
- Etymology: Adapted from a Bemba word for the affliction the dance addresses
- Genre: Ritual healing dance
- Instruments: Drums (ng'oma yikulu, mphiningu, mboza); Hand-clapping; Ankle bells (mangwanda)
- Origin: Northern Malawi, eastern Zambia and southern Tanzania

Sample of Vimbuza healing dance

Vimbuza is a spirit-possession complex and healing dance practised chiefly by the Tumbuka people of northern Malawi, and among related communities in eastern Zambia and southern Tanzania. The term covers three related classes of possessing spirits (vimbuza, virombo and vyanusi), the illnesses they are believed to cause, and the drumming, singing and all-night dancing performed to identify and calm them. Vimbuza took its present form among the Ngoni-Tumbuka of the Mzimba and Rumphi districts during the nineteenth and early twentieth centuries, was banned by the colonial administration in the 1920s, and was inscribed by UNESCO on the Representative List of the Intangible Cultural Heritage of Humanity in 2008, having first been proclaimed a Masterpiece of the Oral and Intangible Heritage of Humanity in 2005.

== Etymology and classification ==
Vimbuza is a generic Tumbuka term for a family of possessing spirits and is used both for the spirits themselves and for the dance performed to treat those they afflict. The word is generally traced to the Bemba and Bisa of what is now Zambia, among whom the earliest form of the possession complex is thought to have arisen; the Tumbuka researcher Boston Soko derives it from Bemba terms connected with the chisungu female initiation rite, though he notes the connection is uncertain and the word may simply have drifted in sound and sense as it travelled between the Bemba and the Tumbuka, who are separated by the intervening Senga.

Tumbuka possession is classified into three principal types, distinguished by their historical origin, the symptoms they produce, and the language in which the possessing spirits are said to speak: vimbuza proper, associated with the Bemba, Bisa and Senga and manifesting as fever-like pains, generalised body aches and loss of appetite; virombo, associated with the Chewa and manifesting as severe pain at the crown of the head and heart palpitations; and vyanusi, associated with the Ngoni and manifesting as a form of mental disturbance that can progress to outright madness if untreated. Individual spirits within each class carry their own names, generally recalled as those of dead chiefs or notable figures from the Bemba, Bisa, Lunda and Senga peoples, among them Chota Muliro, Chanda, Chibesakunda, Kazembe and Njekulala for vimbuza; BaRondo, BaSenga, BaChewa and Makhabango for virombo; and Mngoma, Mhalule and Mthwasi for vyanusi. The historical convergence of Bemba/Bisa, Chewa and Ngoni populations with the Tumbuka, driven largely by the nineteenth-century Ngoni migrations remembered as the Mfecane, is what the Tumbuka themselves give as the reason each spirit class carries a distinct ethnic origin.

Vimbuza spirits are distinguished in Tumbuka belief from the ancestral spirits, mizimu, discussed in the wider Tumbuka spirit world: informants are emphatic that the possessing spirits of Vimbuza are never those of a patient's own direct ancestors, a pattern also recorded among the neighbouring Luvale of western Zambia, where affliction is likewise attributed to contact with other ethnic or racial groups rather than to one's own dead. Some informants interviewed by Soko in the 2000s, however, described a departure from this older pattern, attributing their possessing spirits to a deceased parent or grandparent rather than to a wandering foreign spirit, which he takes as evidence that Vimbuza belief continues to change.

== History ==
=== Rise of the possession cult ===
Vimbuza's emergence among the Tumbuka is bound up with the disappearance of mwavi, the poison ordeal formerly used to identify sorcerers and adulterers, which the colonial administration suppressed in the early twentieth century. Soko argues that Vimbuza, and in particular its divinatory vyanusi form, developed partly as a replacement mechanism: with mwavi gone, communities needed some other means of locating the source of misfortune, since illness and death continued to be attributed to sorcery or to the anger of spirits. Oral and missionary sources agree that the dance in its 1920s form was not the same practice that had existed in 1900, its scale and prominence having grown considerably in the intervening two decades.

=== Colonial prohibition ===
Vimbuza became a matter of official concern soon after the Free Church of Scotland's Livingstonia Mission, led by Robert Laws, and later the colonial administration, established themselves in the Mzimba–Rumphi area from the 1890s onward. A meeting of colonial officials, missionaries and traditional chiefs at Elangeni, recorded in the minute book of the M'mbelwa Native Association in January 1920, laid the groundwork for a formal ban on the dance and its associated divinatory practices around 1924. The reasons given for the ban were varied: officials argued that diviner-healers stirred up accusations of witchcraft that fractured village life, that the dance's itinerant performers were associated with adultery, that the diviners profited from a manufactured "disease", and that Vimbuza disrupted farming and schooling since it was originally performed by day. Soko, writing as a Tumbuka researcher, argues that the deeper motive was the missionaries' wish to erase surviving links to ancestral religion, noting that small shrines to the ancestors (kavuwa) persisted alongside Vimbuza throughout the area his fieldwork covered.

Chiefs were instructed to arrest anyone caught performing the dance, and the district commissioner in Mzimba, known locally as Madondolo, subjected diviners to a test of riddles to distinguish genuine healers from frauds, dealing harshly with those who failed. Chiefs also organised their own raiding parties, whose members were known as kaphaso after the red caps they wore, to confiscate and break drums. The ban was reinforced for roughly a decade by a missionary bulletin, Vyaro na Vyaro, published by Livingstonia Mission, in which local converts amplified the missionaries' arguments against the dance. Despite these measures, Vimbuza persisted; practitioners avoided mission stations and administrative centres and moved the dancing to remote areas at night, and it continued to be practised, officially unlawful, until after the Second World War.

=== Recognition since independence ===
Attitudes toward Vimbuza shifted after Malawi and Zambia became independent in 1964, as newly independent governments began to recast it as valuable traditional culture rather than a colonial-era vice, a shift that also saw entertainment-oriented performances shed of their possession beliefs develop alongside the ritual dance and eventually admit male performers. UNESCO proclaimed Vimbuza a Masterpiece of the Oral and Intangible Heritage of Humanity in 2005 and inscribed it on the Representative List of the Intangible Cultural Heritage of Humanity in 2008. As a cultural practice, Vimbuza is considered a local form of a wider therapeutic complex known across much of central and southern Africa as ngoma, the subject of comparative scholarship by John M. Janzen, and, earlier, of Victor Turner's writing on the Ndembu "drums of affliction".

== Diagnosis and treatment ==
Illness among the Tumbuka is traditionally understood as an imbalance of hot and cold forces within the body, and Vimbuza spirits are said to afflict a person by disturbing this balance; treatment is directed at restoring it. A sick person is normally cared for at home or, increasingly, at a clinic or hospital; but a person believed to be possessed is thought unable to remain in a hospital ward, and families report cases of patients discharging themselves and returning to the village once possession is suspected. The Scottish missionary Donald Fraser observed as early as the 1900s that the Tumbuka attribute almost all serious illness to magical causes for which mission medicine had no answer, and that this conviction was what drove people back to diviners even after a period of mission treatment. Reported onsets of the "disease" are highly varied, ranging from a persistent cough or toothache to complications following a wedding, a miscarriage or a stillbirth, and sufferers describe the condition as most common during the period of new leaf growth that precedes the rainy season, in August and September, and as more active around the new moon.

Once possession is suspected, a diviner-healer, or ng'anga, is consulted to determine whether the illness is truly a case of spirit possession and, if so, which class of spirit is responsible. Treatment then proceeds through a recognised sequence of stages.

=== The test ===
In a first séance, known as kubunyisela, the patient sits covered head to foot with a blanket in a crowded hut while a small gourd (nkhombo) is placed before them and small bells or a drum are set close to their head; an assistant of the same sex as the patient, called the musamu, addresses the concealed spirits directly, urging them to reveal themselves and name their identity. The genies are said to respond by speaking their names one by one through the patient's mouth; only once every spirit present has been named does the musamu remove the blanket and lead the patient outside to be dressed for the dance proper.

=== Dressing ===
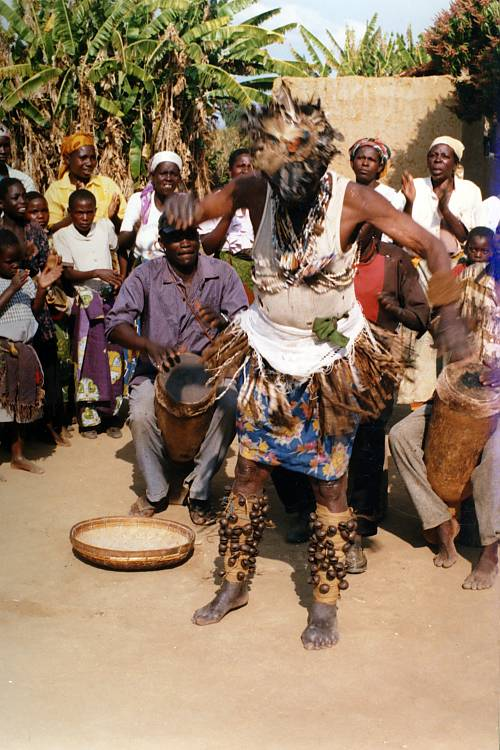
A Vimbuza dancer in Bolero, Rumphi.

The musamu then dresses the patient in the standard costume of a Vimbuza dancer, a man dressing a man and a woman dressing a woman. Men traditionally wear a feathered headdress (njukula), originally worn by Ngoni warriors and dancers, along with feathers on the arms and shorts (kabudula); women wear a headcloth (duku) in place of the beaded band once worn by Ngoni women, together with handkerchiefs, a bracelet and a skirt. Both sexes wear a skirt of goatskin flaps around the waist, called madumbo, zamba or nyisi — the more elaborate examples made of beads — and small iron ankle bells, mangwanda or mangenjeza, whose sound is timed to the drumming. The dancer carries a small symbolic hatchet (mphomphwe); a vyanusi dancer instead carries a spear, or increasingly a walking stick standing in for one, together with a fly-whisk that Soko describes as the badge of a diviner-healer. Since the later twentieth century, dancers have also worn a white or red cross on a uniform whose colour and pattern are said to be revealed to the wearer in a dream and which must be provided to satisfy the possessing spirits.

=== The dance ===
Dancing proceeds through a set of recognised stages, corresponding to particular spirits and their own songs, in an order such as vimbuza, then baMphanda, baRondo and finally vyanusi; few dancers are able to work through the full sequence. The audience is overwhelmingly female, and it takes an active rather than a passive role, singing and clapping while men drum; the diviner-healer directs proceedings while the musamu continues to attend the patient. The dance is structured as a dialogue between a soloist and a responding chorus, and a possessed dancer who feels the audience is not singing or clapping properly may strike the drum in anger or threaten to leave, while one satisfied with the accompaniment may pause to acknowledge particularly capable drummers or singers. A séance has no fixed length: Soko records a session at Hewe involving seventeen dancers that lasted twelve hours, while others last only a few minutes; individual songs can run to fifteen minutes and may be repeated at a spirit's demand.

=== Chilopa, the blood sacrifice ===
The rite of chilopa ("blood", from the Bemba umulopa) is regarded as indispensable to a patient's recovery. The scale of the sacrifice reflects the severity of the case: a cock or pigeon for a lesser affliction, performed at around three in the morning after a night of dancing, or a goat, sheep or cow for a serious one, performed near sunrise. In the sacrifice of a cock, the patient, again concealed under a blanket, bites through the bird's neck and drinks the blood as it flows; for a goat, the patient, having taken a preparatory medicine, mounts the animal's back and drinks blood directly from its throat until it dies, then falls unconscious and is carried home, regaining awareness only some hours later. Soko's informants describe the rite as transferring the sacrificed animal's life to the patient, satisfying the possessing spirit's demand for fresh blood and, in doing so, restoring the patient to health.

The ethnomusicologist Steven Friedson, who studied and himself danced Vimbuza in Malawi in the 1990s, analyses chilopa as structured around the same hot–cold opposition that governs Tumbuka illness generally: ritual action moves inward, growing hotter, toward the act of drinking fresh, still-warm blood, before moving back outward toward the cooler periphery of the rite, and it is this movement from heat to cold that the ceremony is understood to achieve for the patient. A reviewer of Friedson's book praised it for its attention to the interaction of music, dance, costume, symbolism, belief and ritual in Tumbuka healing.

Afterwards, a course of herbal remedies drawn from a range of locally identified plants, among them chitongololo, mphangula and msindila, is administered as a decoction, wash or bath depending on the severity and type of complaint, though healers were reportedly reluctant to disclose the full list of plants used for fear of provoking the spirits.

== Music ==
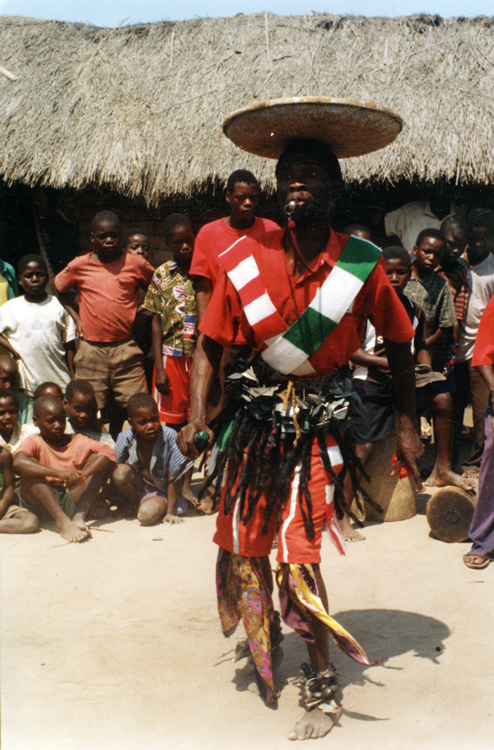
A Vimbuza dancer from Mzimba, Malawi.

Drumming provides the only instrumental accompaniment; in the Mzimba area, two drums of different sizes are typically used, the large ng'oma yikulu and the smaller mphiningu, which varies the base rhythm, while in Rumphi a third, slower drum called mboza is also used. The drums are carved from a light wood locally called mubale and are said to be audible for several kilometres in calm weather; their manufacture is treated with some ritual caution, and they are considered vulnerable to interference by sorcerers or by the presence of a menstruating woman during a séance. Among the Ngoni, vyanusi dancing was historically accompanied not by drums but by an instrument called ingubhu, a basin-shaped shell of dried cattle hide, and later by the clashing of war shields to imitate its sound, before drumming eventually displaced both once large-scale warfare had ended.

Vimbuza songs are typically performed as a dialogue between a dancer, who leads, and the surrounding audience, who form the chorus, a call-and-response pattern the anthropologist Steven Friedson and reviewers of his work describe as central to the therapeutic effect of the performance rather than merely accompanying it. The scholar of Tumbuka oral literature Boston Soko analyses Vimbuza songs as a distinct genre of oral literature, arguing that their imagery, structure and rhetorical devices place them alongside the tale and the proverb as a vehicle through which Tumbuka society expresses its values.

== Social role ==
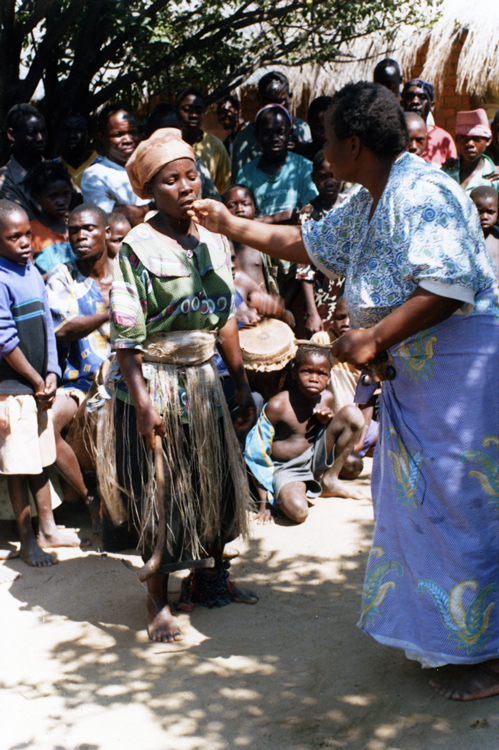
Women Vimbuza dancers in Rumphi, Malawi

Patients and dancers are predominantly women, and Vimbuza's audience, too, is overwhelmingly female; the anthropologist I. M. Lewis's cross-cultural argument, that possession cults in patriarchal societies function partly as protest movements through which women who otherwise lack a public voice can influence husbands and male relatives, has been applied to Vimbuza by Soko, who links the dance's appeal for women to the pressures of the Tumbuka patrilineal and virilocal marriage system. Alongside the "sacred", possession-based dance, a distinct "profane" or entertainment form of Vimbuza developed, using satirical songs, vigerembo or vigetyo, that Soko dates to around the 1920s and links to a herbal stimulant, seketela or mphelele, which allows a performer to dance as though possessed without undergoing genuine possession. Soko traces the satirical repertoire in part to pathuli, songs composed by women while pounding maize, arguing that Vimbuza performance gave these songs, and the social criticism of institutions such as marriage, polygamy and the male council (mphala), a wider public airing without provoking open conflict.

== Vimbuza and Christianity ==
Vimbuza has become part of the syncretistic Christianity practised by many Tumbuka today rather than standing apart from it, a continuity discussed at greater length, together with the broader history of missionary opposition to Tumbuka traditional religion, in the Tumbuka people article.

== Contemporary practice ==
Vimbuza has also been reshaped by Malawi's post-independence tourism and cultural-heritage industries: performances are staged for visitors and, since UNESCO's recognition, promoted internationally, while diviner-healers increasingly work as paid organisers of public dance events and treat patients privately, a shift Soko describes as having turned what was once a communal response to illness into something closer to a private, individually purchased service. Variant regional forms continue alongside the core dance: in parts of Rumphi and Mzimba a form used specifically as an exorcism rite is known as mkhalachitatu Vimbuza, while in Nkhata Bay a related practice is performed under the name masyabi.

Vimbuza's rhythms and vocal style have also fed into contemporary Malawian popular music. The singer NyaGo (Lucy Gondwe) is among the musicians who have drawn on Vimbuza in more recent recordings and performances.

== See also ==
- Tumbuka people
- Tumbuka mythology
- Ngoma drums
- Traditional dances and festivals of the Tumbuka people
