= Lundazi District =

Coordinates: 12°30′S 32°45′E

- District
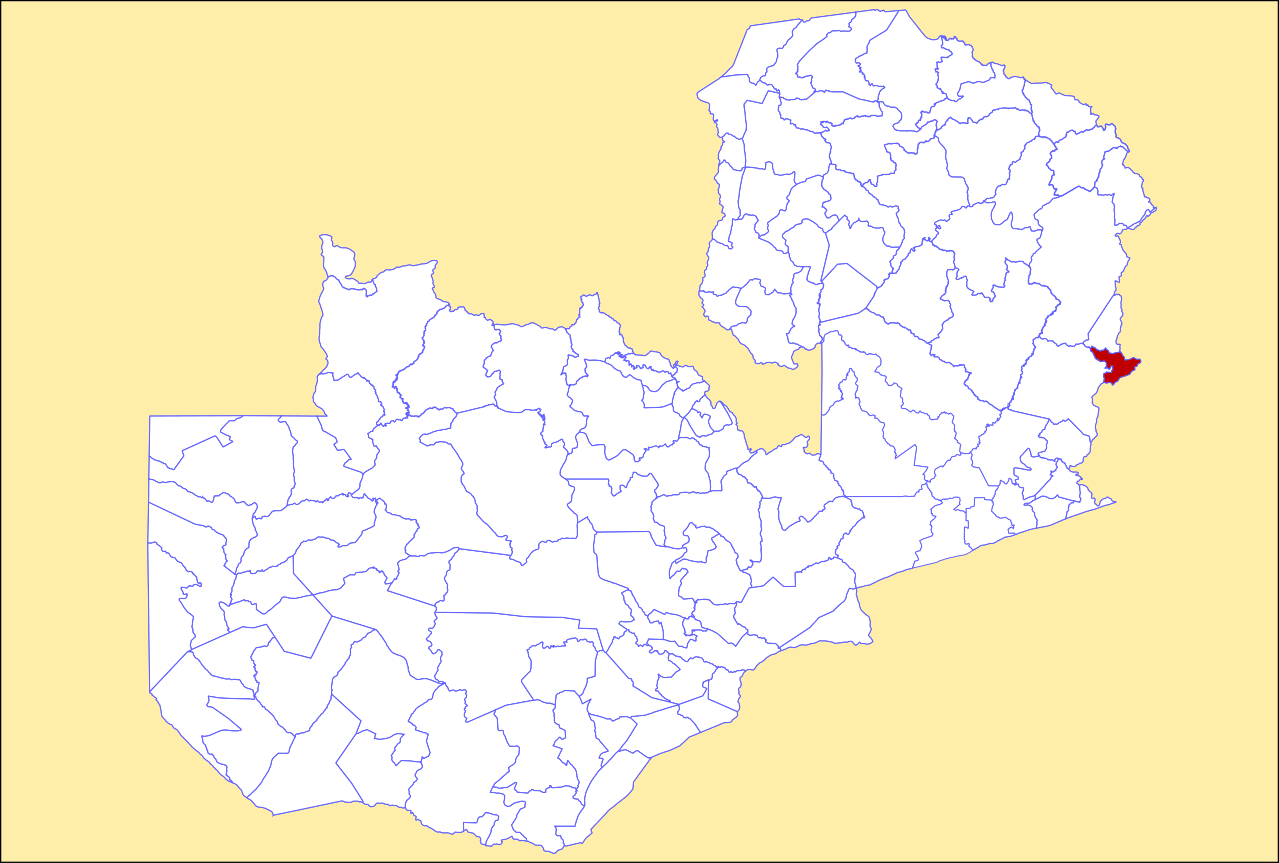
- District location in Zambia
- Country: Zambia
- Province: Eastern Province
- Capital: Lundazi

Area
  - Total: 1,375.6 km^{2} (531.1 sq mi)

Population (2022)
  - Total: 154,908
  - Density: 112.61/km^{2} (291.66/sq mi)
- Time zone: UTC+2 (CAT)

Lundazi District is a district in Zambia, located in Eastern Province. The capital is Lundazi. The district shares borders with Chasefu District to the north, Lumezi District to the south-west, and the Republic of Malawi to the east and south.

In 2022, the district had an estimated population of 154,908 people. In 2018, Lundazi district was divided into 3 districts (Lundazi, Lumezi and Chasefu) by the government to enable rural development. Tumbuka is the predominant language spoken in the district.

== History ==
Lundazi District was established in 1942 as a Rural Council and later designated as a District Council in 1991. With a population of approximately 154,908, the district has a slight female majority, with 79,721 women and 75,187 men.

The capital is Lundazi and is named after the Lundazi River, now part of the Lundazi Dam. An Englishman, Errol Button, built a Norman-style castle in Lundazi in 1948, where the rivers converge. The castle and other similar buildings are notable landmarks in the town.

=== Location ===
The district is located approximately 743 kilometers east of Lusaka and 184 kilometers from the provincial capital, Chipata. It covers an area of 1,348 square kilometers and is situated near Lake Malawi in Malawi. The district's topography is generally hilly with valleys dissected by streams and rivers.

=== Climate ===
The town experiences a humid subtropical climate.

== Demographics ==
=== Ethnic groups ===
The predominant tribes are Tumbuka, Chewa, and Ngoni. Agriculture and trading drive the local economy, with traders mostly being Zambians of Asian origin. It is also known for its cultural heritage. Lundazi has a nickname, "Box One Kanele."

=== Languages ===
The major language spoken is Tumbuka along with English being official. Other minor languages include Chewa.

=== Wards ===
The district is composed of 10 wards, a single constituency (Lundazi), and is led by three traditional leaders: Senior Chief Mwase, Chief Mphamba, and Chief Kapichila. The central business district and Lundazi township are specifically located in Chief Mphamba's area.

== Culture ==
The district hosts the annual Kulonga ceremony, a significant Tumbuka cultural event that celebrates the good harvesting. Other traditional dances and ceremonies include Vimbuza, and Zengani.

== Economy ==
The main economic activities in the district include agriculture, primarily on a small scale, trade, small-scale mining, and tourism.
