= Tumbuka people =

Ethnic group of Central Southern Africa

Tumbuka ŵaTumbuka
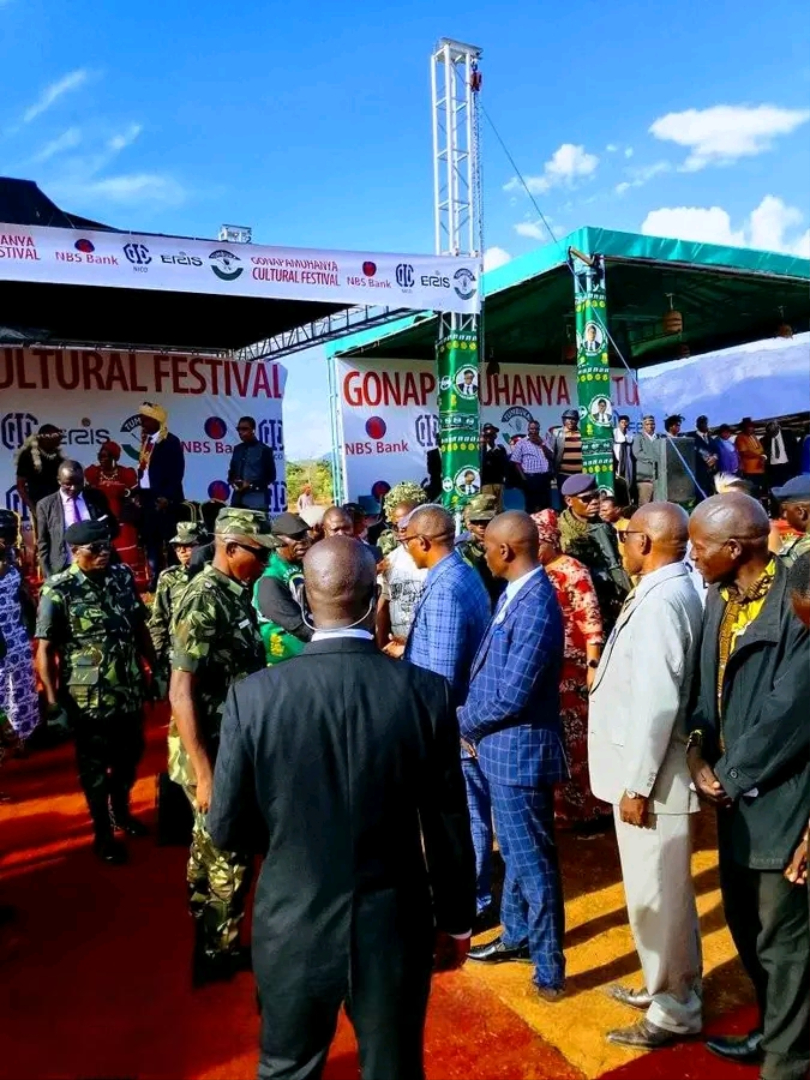
- The Tumbuka festival of Gonapamuhanya

Total population
- c. 10.3 million (2022 est.); 1,614,955 in Malawi (2018 census)

Languages
- Chitumbuka, English

Religion
- Christianity, Tumbuka mythology, Islam

Related ethnic groups
- Senga people, Yombe people (Zambia), Tonga people (Malawi)

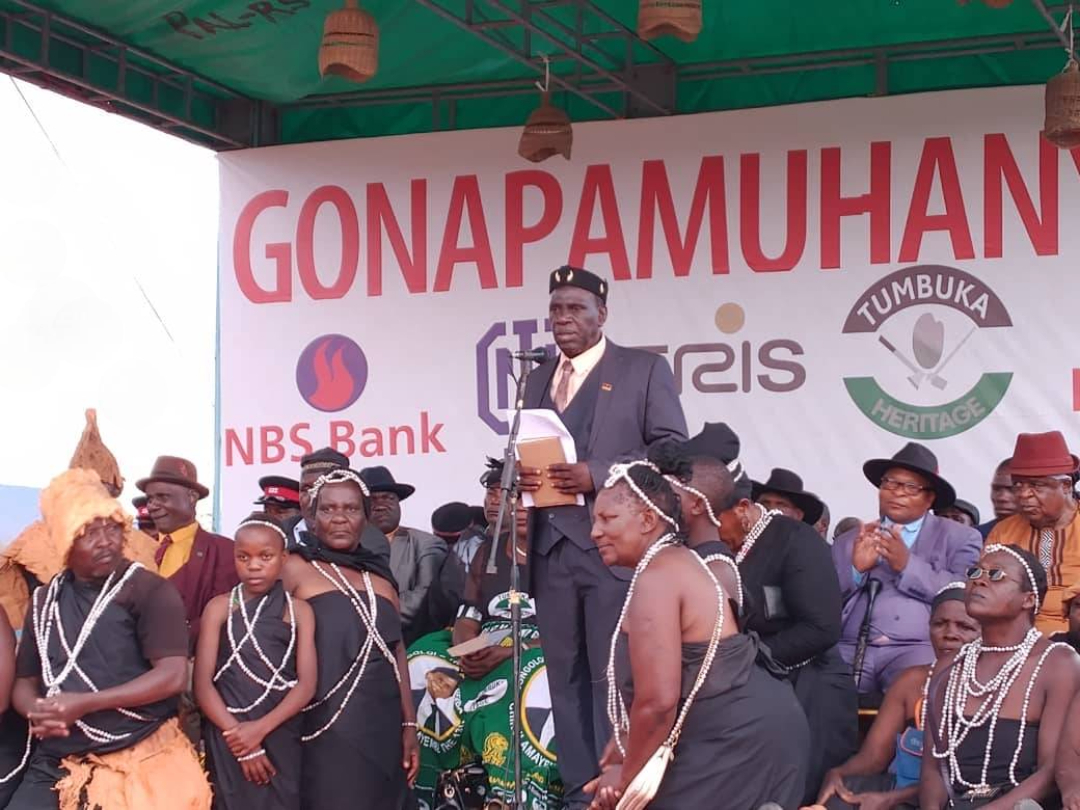
The Tumbuka cultural festival

The Tumbuka (also known as Yombe, Tonga, Kamanga, Senga and Henga) are a group of Bantu people found in Malawi, Zambia, Tanzania and Zimbabwe. More than fifteen related groups are counted among the wider Tumbuka family, including the Senga, Nyika, Henga, Yombe, Phoka and Tonga, all of whom speak dialects of the same language and trace their history to a common kingdom. Their language, Chitumbuka, has around a dozen recorded dialects, among them Yombe, Senga and Wenya. These groups were at one time brought together under a single ruler, in what became known as the Nkhamanga Kingdom.

According to oral traditions recorded by the historians Yizenge Chondoka and Frackson Bota, several smaller Tumbuka groups also survive in the north-western corner of the old kingdom, between Kalonga and Isoka, and across the border in Tanzania; many of these belong to what is called the Kalonga wa Nkhonde segment of the wider Mulonga Mbulalubilo lineage.

Like a number of neighbouring peoples, the Tumbuka trace their origins to the Luba Kingdom in what is now the Democratic Republic of the Congo, which they are said to have left in the early 1400s, before any of the states of the region had taken the shape they would later have. Oral history holds that the group left in the company of the ancestors of the Hehe and Gogo peoples of Tanzania and the Mwakyusa, under an overall leader named Mudala, and that the Tumbuka contingent was itself led by a man remembered as Mulonga Mbulalubilo. A separate tradition describes the Tumbuka's departure from Luba territory as a flight from a warrior group known as Kongolo, who are said to have later absorbed the people who remained behind.

== Demography and language ==
Malawi's most recent national census, carried out by the National Statistical Office in September 2018, counted 1,614,955 Tumbuka by tribe, 9.2 percent of the country's enumerated population of 17,563,749; the great majority, 1,311,292 people, lived in the Northern Region, with a further 236,695 in the Central Region and 66,968 in the Southern Region, reflecting the long history of Tumbuka labour migration described above. The same census recorded 940,184 people in Mzimba district, 284,681 in Nkhata Bay, 229,161 in Rumphi and 234,927 in Chitipa, the districts that make up the historical Tumbuka and Tonga heartland, and it found the Northern Region to have Malawi's highest regional literacy rate, at 79 percent, with Rumphi ranking second among all Malawian districts, at 83 percent. These national census figures cover only Malawi and do not include Tumbuka communities in Zambia, Tanzania and Zimbabwe.

Various estimates suggest that, across these four countries, over ten million people speak Tumbuka as a first or second language. Ethnologue put the total number of Tumbuka speakers at 10,346,000 in 2022. Ember and her co-authors estimate that a further million or so Tumbuka people live elsewhere in central and southern Africa, in countries such as Tanzania and Zimbabwe, largely because of a long history of labour migration.

The Tumbuka language, or Chitumbuka, belongs to the Bantu family and is classified by Guthrie as Zone N, Group 20; its home territory runs roughly from Lake Malawi in the east to the Luangwa River valley in Zambia in the west, bordered by Tonga and Chewa speech to the south and by Ngonde, Sukwa and Lambya speech to the north. Twelve dialects have been identified and studied, among them Henga, Phoka, Wenya, Mzimba and the Lake Shore dialect. Chitumbuka is mutually intelligible with the Tonga language, which linguists treat as one of its dialects; in the nineteenth century, missionaries settled on these two dialects as the standard forms of what was, in effect, a single language.

Before Britain established a protectorate over Nyasaland, the area now known as Malawi's Northern Region held many culturally related but loosely organised communities, governed largely by autonomous village headmen and speaking various dialects of Chitumbuka. Missionaries active in the late nineteenth century consolidated these dialects into a small number of standard languages, settling on Chitumbuka as the medium of instruction across the north in preference to Ngoni, Tonga or Ngonde, which they treated as minor dialects.

Chitumbuka became an official language of Malawi in 1934, alongside Chewa and English, and for over two decades it was used in government, on national radio, in the school curriculum and in public life. Hastings Banda withdrew both Chichewa and Chitumbuka from official status in 1968, leaving English alone with that standing, and Chitumbuka was also dropped as a medium of instruction and in examinations, while Chichewa continued to be used in education. The secondary school entrance system was manipulated in ways that favoured candidates from the Central Region over those from the Northern Region. Some who objected to the ban on Chitumbuka were arrested or harassed in public, but both the Church of Central Africa Presbyterian and the Catholic Church went on using Chitumbuka religious texts and preaching in the language across the Northern and Central regions.

After Malawi returned to multi-party politics, Tumbuka-language radio programmes began broadcasting nationally in 1994, but a 1996 proposal to reintroduce Tumbuka as a medium of instruction for the first four years of compulsory schooling was turned down. Since then, a grassroots body, the Chitumbuka Language and Culture Association, has taken up both the practical work of standardising Chitumbuka spelling and teaching material and the more contested question of what should count as "proper" Chitumbuka, given the dialect variation described above.

=== Modern scholarship, ideophones and Bible translation ===
Chitumbuka has been the subject of sustained modern linguistic study, including work on its noun class system, its tone and sentence stress, the syntax of embedded questions, and the phonetics of its nasal-consonant sequences and vowel length. Like other Bantu languages, Chitumbuka makes heavy use of ideophones, single words built mostly from verbs or nouns that compress a whole situation, state or action into one term, and that can be doubled for emphasis or repeated motion; a 2015 collection by Songiso Mvalo records many of these alongside the idioms and proverbs through which Chitumbuka speakers value economy of expression.

The Bible has been translated into Chitumbuka three times: a first translation appeared in 1952 and was revised in 1989, and the Bible Society of Malawi launched a new "common language" translation, intended to be more accessible than its predecessors, at Mzuzu in February 2018. That translation had taken from 1994 to 2013 to complete, involved three main translators and about twenty reviewers, and was overseen by United Bible Societies consultants; the CCAP Synod of Livingstonia and the Reformed Mission League supported the project with office space and staff funding respectively.

== History ==
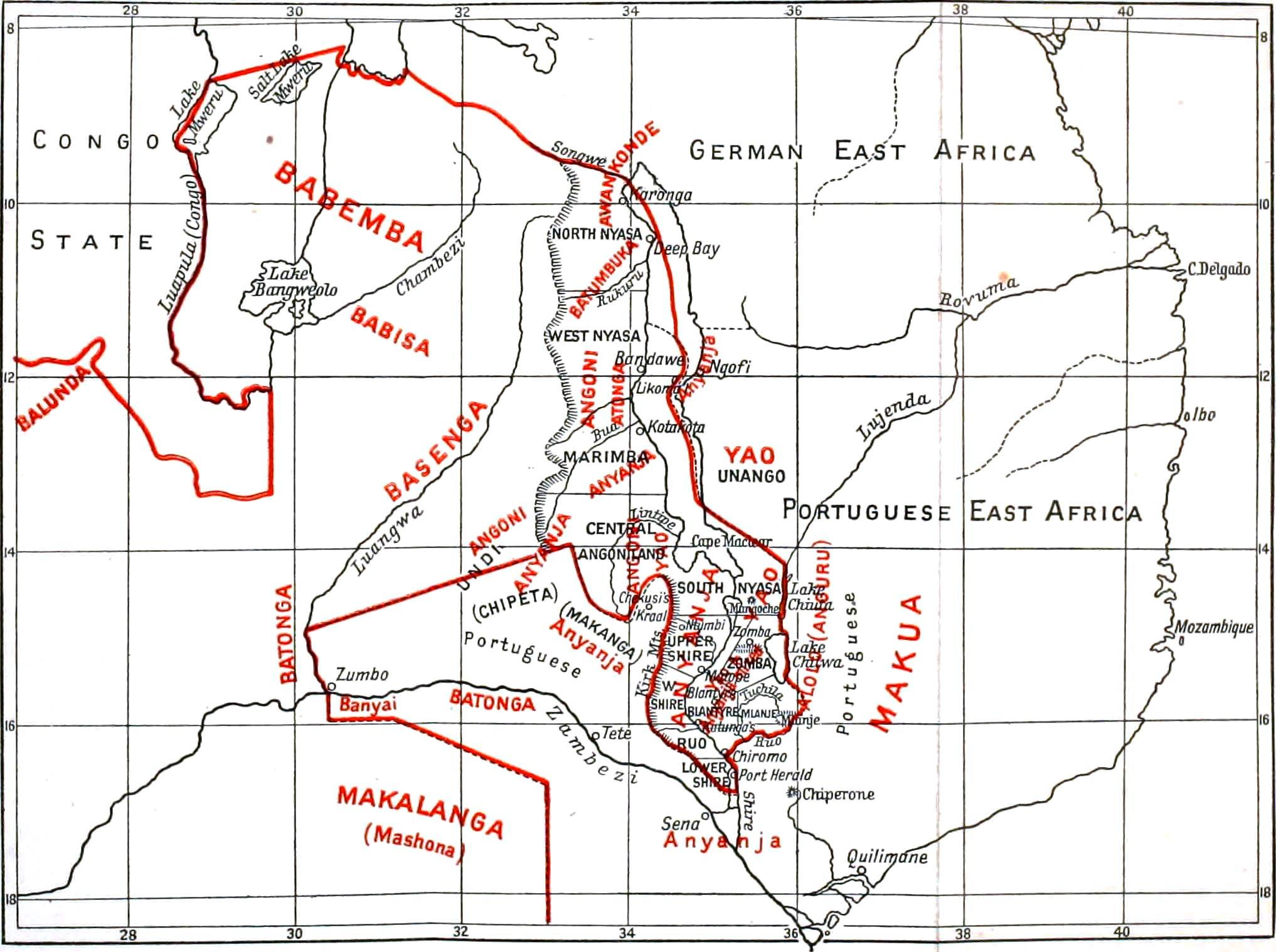
A 1906 British Central Africa map showing the distribution of various ethnic groups. Tumbuka are marked as Batumbuka and shown near the German East Africa region in this map.

The Tumbuka probably entered the area between the Luangwa valley and northern Lake Malawi in the fifteenth century. By the start of the eighteenth century they had formed a number of groups, among them the Henga, living in small, independent communities spread thinly across the area without any central organisation.

=== Mulowoka, the Balowoka and the Chikulamayembe chieftainship ===
By the mid-eighteenth century, traders dressed "as Arabs" but originating from the Unyamwezi region of what is now Tanzania were trading for ivory, and to some extent slaves, as far inland as the Luangwa valley. They formed alliances with groups of Henga, and their leader founded the Chikulamayembe Dynasty, which ruled a federation of small chiefdoms. By the 1830s, however, the dynasty was in decline, and the area reverted to political and military disorganisation.

Historians researching the Tumbuka's own oral traditions have added further detail to this founding story. Around 1780, a group of traders known as the Balowoka settled among the Tumbuka under a leader remembered as Mulowoka, whose real name was Kakalala Musaiwila; Mulowoka ("the one who crossed") referred to his having led his people across Lake Malawi from its eastern to its western shore. Very little is recorded of Tumbuka history before Mulowoka's arrival, beyond the fact that the Luhanga clan, led by an influential figure named Mubila, was then dominant in the Nkhamanga area, alongside the Bota and Kumwenda clans.

Mulowoka and his companions were traders seeking ivory, which the Tumbuka at the time regarded as having little value and bartered away for cloth, beads and cowrie shells. He married into the Luhanga clan without having children by that marriage, and later into the Kumwenda clan, by whom he had several children; his generosity, and the fact that he settled peaceably among the Tumbuka, led the local clans to make him their chief. The resulting chieftainship took the title Chikulamayembe, said to derive from the Swahili phrase chukua majembe, "pick up the hoes" — reportedly an instruction Mulowoka gave his assistants as they travelled through Nkhamanga distributing hoes and cloth free of charge. Mulowoka himself never held the title; it passed first to his son, remembered as Khalapamuhanya or Gonapamuhanya ("sit in the sun" and "sleep in the sun", names referring to his habit of dozing in the sun after his midday meal), whose grave near the Lunyina River at Mphande later gave the area its association with the modern Gonapamuhanya festival, before the Chikulamayembe seat moved to Bolero, where it remains.

Because Gonapamuhanya was an only son, the chieftainship passed on his death to his nephew, Kamphungu Nkhonjera, whose violent attempt to keep the title within his own line — killing and driving out members of the Chikulamayembe lineage — led his subjects to burn him to death in his hut and restore the chieftainship to the Chikulamayembe family. Successive chiefs, Pitamkusa Gondwe, Bwati Gondwe I, Cheyeka Gondwe, Mujuma Gondwe and Bamantha Gondwe, held the title in relatively uneventful succession, until the Ngoni invasion of the Nkhamanga Kingdom during the reign of Bwati Gondwe II, discussed further below; the chieftainship was eventually restored under colonial rule in 1907, when Chilongozi Gondwe became Chikulamayembe.

=== Ivory and the slave trade ===
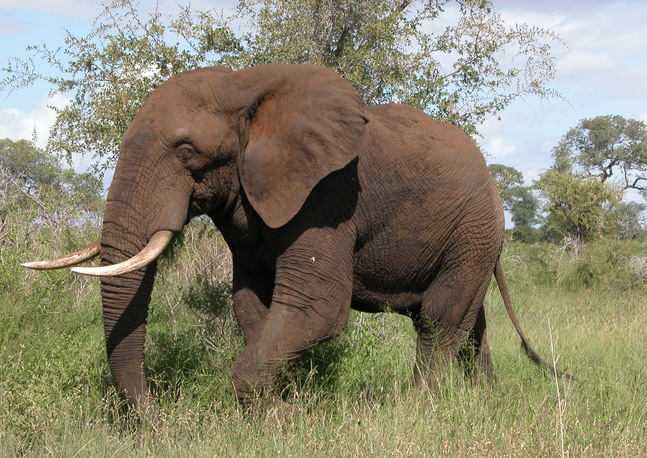
The demand for elephant ivory from northern Malawi, along with the slavery market, devastated the Tumbuka people in the eighteenth and nineteenth centuries.

The large elephant herds of the region attracted coastal Swahili ivory hunters and traders, followed in the colonial era by European ivory traders. In the 1840s, Swahili Arabs entered the northern Malawi region: Jumbe Salim bin Abdallah (Note: Jumbe means "chief, boss" in the regional language.) established a trading centre at Nkhotakota near Lake Malawi, and his trade in slaves for the clove plantations of Zanzibar and the wider Middle Eastern market provoked raids and violence against the Tumbuka. A male slave was known as muzga or kapolo, and a young female slave as chituntulu.

Rising European demand for ivory sharpened conflict over control of the export trade, producing sharper social distinctions and more centralised chiefdoms among the Tumbuka. These ruling groups collapsed around 1855, when the militarised Ngoni, who had migrated from South Africa, arrived seeking agricultural slaves and recruits in addition to those already taken by Swahili traders.

=== Sub-groups: the Tonga ===
When the Tumbuka in the east of the Nkhamanga Kingdom came under attack, they split into two groups. One group settled eastward, in what is now Nkhata Bay District, and over generations of relative isolation their speech developed a distinct accent, known as Tonga, which remains a form of the Tumbuka language; Glottolog places Tonga and Tumbuka within a single language family. The main difference from the parent language is that Tonga tends to end certain words in "u" where Tumbuka uses "o". This group is also called Nyasa Tonga, to distinguish it from unrelated peoples of the same name, and its dialect is known as Chitonga. Under colonial rule, the Tonga sub-group learned Chitumbuka in school, since it was then one of Malawi's official languages.

This Tonga dialect and people are unrelated to the Tonga language and people of Zambia and Zimbabwe, who belong to a different branch of the Bantu family. Malawi's 2018 census recorded 310,031 people identifying as Tonga by tribe, 218,758 of them in the Northern Region.

=== Ngoni invasion and the Tumbuka–Ngoni war ===
The Ngoni of Mbelwa (also known as M'mbelwa) were a branch of Zwangendaba's Ngoni, who began migrating from South Africa between 1819 and 1822, eventually reaching southern Tanzania, where they remained until Zwangendaba's death in the mid-1840s. His followers then split into several groups, one of which, under his son Mbelwa, settled permanently in what is now the Mzimba district of northern Malawi around 1855. Mbelwa's Ngoni treated the Henga as subjects, exacting tribute and taking captives through raiding; these captives were rarely sold to Swahili traders, but were instead kept as unfree agricultural workers or enrolled in Ngoni regiments. Some Henga conscripts revolted and fled north, entering Ngonde territory around 1881, where the Ngonde settled them as a buffer against their enemies.

The Swahili traders had built most of their stockades in the territory where the Henga had settled, and as the African Lakes Company established a trading base at Karonga and the threat of Ngoni raids receded, the Ngonde state found both the Henga and the Swahili less useful. Both groups were outsiders among the Ngonde majority and suspicious of cooperation between the company and the Ngonde, and so allied with one another. This alliance of the Swahili and the Henga confronted a rival alliance between the Ngonde and the African Lakes Company, and the resulting rivalry became the so-called Karonga War, a series of skirmishes and sieges fought between 1887 and 1889.

The Ngoni invasion initially devastated the Tumbuka, through death, the destruction of family and settlement, and the abandonment of the fertile valleys they had farmed, as people hid in mountains, on small islands and in marshes to escape both the large-scale raiding and the associated elephant hunting. The invasion also produced considerable intermarriage and cultural mixing between Tumbuka and Ngoni.

The British explorer David Livingstone, writing about the Lake Malawi region in 1858, described the enslavement of Tumbuka people both through the export trade that served Arab demand and through domestic slavery used as a form of "debt settlement". Christian missionaries reached the region in the 1870s.

In 1895, British-led forces defeated the slave trader Mlozi at Karonga, ending the slave trade there. Although Britain had proclaimed a protectorate over what is now Malawi in 1891, the Northern Ngoni did not finally accept British rule until 1904, when the Tumbuka ceased to be their vassals, or returned to their original homes from wherever they had taken refuge. A Chikulamayembe paramount chief was restored to office in 1907, and Tumbuka culture reasserted itself. Education provided by Scottish-run missions at several sites in the Northern Region of Nyasaland was more readily embraced by the Tumbuka and Tonga, whose earlier social organisation and religion had suffered from slave raiders and the Ngoni, than by the Ngoni and Ngonde themselves, who had kept these institutions intact; consequently more mission schools opened among the Tumbuka than among any other Nyasaland group, and the education they provided reached more pupils and, on the whole, surpassed that available elsewhere in the protectorate, though other Scottish missionaries at Blantyre Mission also advanced education for some southerners. Those the missions trained became an educated African elite who found work as teachers, in the colonial civil service or in commerce, and who pressed politically for African advancement to higher administrative positions. The Yao in the south, many of whom were Muslims excluded from Christian schooling, and the Chewa in the centre, where fewer missions had been founded, were less affected by these political currents.

=== Colonial economy and labour migration ===
In the pre-colonial period, the Tumbuka, like most peoples of what became Nyasaland, relied on subsistence farming to support their families. During the first three decades of colonial rule, commercial agriculture developed both on European-owned estates and on the smallholdings of African peasant farmers in the southern and central parts of the protectorate. Attempts to introduce commercial agriculture into the Northern Region, however, were frustrated by a lack of suitable crops and by the high cost of transport to distant markets. As early as the 1880s, Tumbuka and Tonga men began leaving the region to work as porters and estate labourers in the Southern Region of Nyasaland, and once mission-educated Tumbuka reached adulthood, many travelled on to Southern Rhodesia and South Africa, where their literacy and numeracy commanded far higher wages than they could earn at home. The colonial government worried about the scale of this labour migration, but for many in the north it was close to a necessity, given the shortage of alternatives to subsistence farming.

The colonial government referred to the Tumbuka-speaking areas as the country's "Dead North," yet invested only modestly in infrastructure or in promoting commercial crops there. One proponent of the underdevelopment thesis traces the impoverishment and stagnation of these areas to a process beginning in the mid-nineteenth century, when the Indian Ocean ivory and slave trade created new demand for imported goods and encouraged social differentiation within Tumbuka society. The mid-nineteenth-century Ngoni incursion compounded this, with many Tumbuka losing status as Ngoni serfs or as refugees with limited access to land; Ngoni farming methods, based on shifting or slash-and-burn cultivation and heavy cattle stocking, were said at the time to impoverish the soil and encourage the spread of the tsetse fly. Historian Leroy Vail argues that the effects of the Ngoni invasion were compounded through the colonial period up to 1939, since men in the "Dead North" had, at best, little choice but to migrate for work and, at worst, were recruited by force for the mines, farms and other employers of Southern Rhodesia and South Africa.

Much of Vail's account of environmental degradation in Northern Nyasaland rests on the views of nineteenth-century missionaries, who regarded Ngoni farming practices as environmentally destructive, wasteful and morally suspect, though modern agronomists consider shifting cultivation potentially efficient and well suited to the environment. His claim that both labour recruitment and the consumption of imported goods were forced on the Tumbuka appears overstated: the first labour migration from the region was voluntary, and in later years the Nyasaland government was more often disapproving of it than actively promoting it.

=== Independence and after ===
Since independence, the economic position of the Tumbuka has changed little, and their political influence has remained limited given the number of ethnic groups competing for it in this part of Africa.

Levi Mumba, Charles Chinula and many of the leading figures in the organisations that fed into the Nyasaland African Congress, or in Congress itself, were Tumbuka-speaking northerners or graduates of Blantyre Mission; this movement eventually secured Malawi's independence in 1964.

In the run-up to independence in 1963, Tumbuka speakers took a majority of ministerial posts in the government of Hastings Banda. Shortly after independence, in the 1964 Cabinet Crisis, these ministers' demands for faster Africanisation — a central goal of the mission-educated elite — led to their resignation or dismissal, and in many cases to exile. Banda subsequently purged their supporters and other Tumbuka speakers from positions of influence, replacing them with Chewa appointees from the Central Region, while promoting Chewa culture as the sole authentic Malawian culture.

=== Regional disparity and language politics since 1994 ===
Malawi's return to multi-party democracy in 1994 removed the legal ban on Chitumbuka broadcasting and reduced the most direct forms of political exclusion, but it did not close the gap in infrastructure, schooling and public investment that had opened up between the Northern Region and the rest of the country under Banda; scholars studying regional and ethnic politics in Malawi describe the disparity as continuing to shape how northerners, Tumbuka speakers among them, see their place in national life. One figure in this history was the Presbyterian minister and theologian Stephen Kauta Msiska, who taught at the united CCAP theological college at Nkhoma from 1962 to 1974 before his opposition to the one-party state cost him his position and drove him back to his home village, where he lived quietly until Malawi's return to multi-party politics; his later book on Tumbuka Christianity and traditional religion was published only after Banda's government had left office.

The chieftaincy at the centre of Tumbuka political life has itself remained a point of contention into the 2020s. Following the death in 2018 of Paramount Chief Walter Gondwe, a succession dispute developed between the installed Paramount Chief, Chikulamayembe Joseph Bongololo Gondwe, and Walter Gondwe's son Mtima Gondwe, whose supporters maintain he was wrongly passed over for the chieftaincy. The dispute broke into open violence at the 2025 Gonapamuhanya festival, discussed further below, prompting Malawi's second vice-president, Enock Chihana, to publicly caution against political interference in chieftaincy succession and to insist that royal families be left free to choose their own leaders.

== Society and culture ==
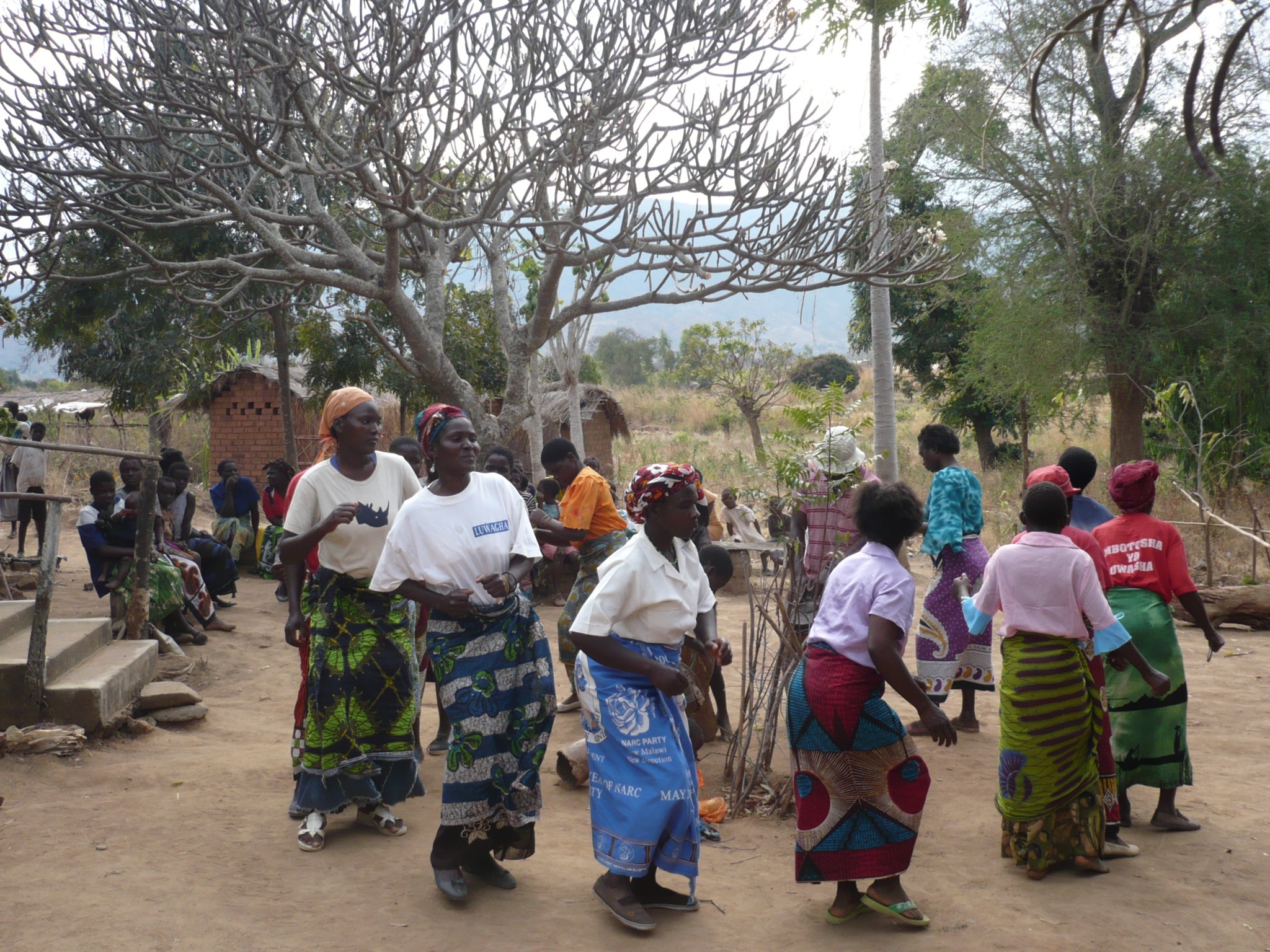
A Tumbuka women's dance group.

Christian missionaries had already reached the Tumbuka before formal colonial rule was established. Thomas Cullen Young, one of the first to publish on Tumbuka culture, produced Notes on the history of the Tumbuka-Kamanga peoples in the Northern Province of Nyasaland. Young, a Scottish missionary who served at Livingstonia, Karonga, Loudon and Kasungu in Malawi and at Tamanda in Zambia between 1904 and 1931, later worked for the Religious Tract Society in Britain; a 1978 review of his book praised its ethnographic detail and photographs while criticising its organisation and prose. To assist the conversion process, missionaries translated hymns and elements of Christian teaching into Chitumbuka, producing a Tumbuka hymnbook. Most Tumbuka people today identify as Christian, while retaining older beliefs and folklore.

=== Religion and ancestors ===
The Tumbuka developed a sophisticated traditional religion built around a supreme creator called Chiuta, associated with the sun and held to be "self created and all knowing". This belief has produced a rich, morally pointed mythology. As in neighbouring parts of Africa, the Tumbuka have also revered ancestor spirits and observed witchcraft beliefs and related practices.

Ancestors, known collectively as mizimu (singular muzimu), are understood as the spirits of dead parents and grandparents, also addressed as wasekulu withu, "our grandparents". The Tumbuka believe that when a person dies the body is buried but the spirit departs from it, and that ancestors rank second to God, serving as intercessors between the living and the divine — a belief the Tumbuka share with the neighbouring Chewa. Ancestors are held to be capable of causing misfortune to their descendants, often revealed through divination, dreams, or the sighting of particular snakes and grasshoppers, when the living have neglected their wishes; among the things ancestors are said to disapprove of are quarrelling between relatives and a man's abandoning his ancestral land to settle elsewhere. Once such misfortunes, including illness, are attributed to the ancestors, the Tumbuka consider neither traditional nor Western medicine to be of any use: the remedy instead lies in addressing the ancestors directly and resolving whatever grievance provoked them. Some scholars have argued that the Tumbuka were formerly organised along matrilineal lines, and that it was Ngoni conquest and prolonged contact with the Ngoni that shifted them toward the strongly patrilineal descent system observed today, under which inheritance passes from father to son.

Illness itself has traditionally been read through a similar lens: informants in Rumphi District have described conditions such as thola (associated with pallor and wasting, and linked by health workers to anaemia caused by malaria), chikoko and chitaska as arising not only from natural causes but from contact with death, such as entering a house where a corpse lies or failing to wash after a funeral before handling a child.

=== Vimbuza and healing ===
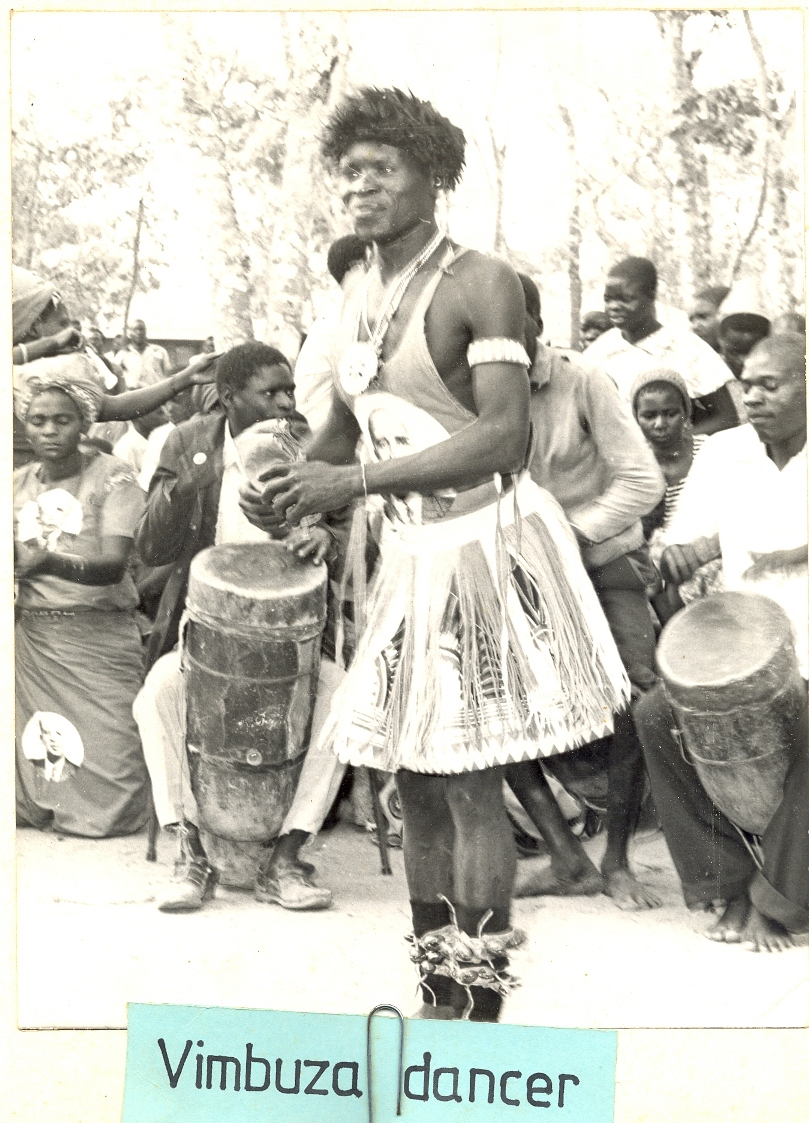
The Tumbuka Vimbuza dance is on UNESCO's cultural heritage list.

Spirit possession and its associated therapies are known as Vimbuza (singular chimbuza), a term covering several classes of possessive spirits, the states of illness they are believed to produce, and the therapeutic drumming, music, dance and ritual performed to treat them. As a cultural practice, Vimbuza is a local form of a wider therapeutic complex known elsewhere as ngoma, found across much of central and southern Africa and the subject of important scholarship by John M. Janzen and others, as well as, earlier still, of Victor Turner's writing on Ndembu "drums of affliction".

In Tumbuka belief, vimbuza are a category of spirits that cause illness by unbalancing the hot and cold forces within the body — a concept James Peoples and Garrick Bailey compare to the "bodily humours" of early European medicine — and this imbalance is treated through a ritual dance accompanied by singing and music. UNESCO inscribed the Vimbuza healing dance on the Representative List of the Intangible Cultural Heritage of Humanity in 2008 (having first proclaimed it in 2005). A reviewer of Steven Friedson's ethnography Dancing Prophets, the fullest study of the practice, described the book as attentive to the interaction of music, dance, costume, symbolism, belief and ritual in Tumbuka healing. The instruments used include the ng'oma, or "drums of affliction"; a healer first diagnoses spirit possession, and the patient then undergoes a dance-based ritual treatment lasting weeks or months, in which the dance aims to bring the patient into a trance while the songs summon the possessing spirits, and men provide spirit-specific drum rhythms, sometimes taking the healer's role themselves. UNESCO describes Vimbuza as creating a "space for patients to dance their disease".

The Vimbuza tradition encompasses both this dance and a wider set of practices and beliefs used to treat psychological illness and to exorcise spirits; in some areas, a variant used specifically as an exorcism rite for those possessed by demons or evil spirits is known as mkhalachitatu Vimbuza. The practice is most common in Rumphi but has spread to Mzimba, Karonga, Kasungu and other districts; in Nkhata Bay it is performed under the name masyabi, with local variations. Vimbuza has also become part of the syncretistic Christianity practised by many Tumbuka today, rather than standing apart from it.

=== Kinship and marriage ===
The Tumbuka are a patrilineal society: on marriage, a woman moves to her husband's village and lives among his relatives, and it is considered highly unusual, even suspect, for a man to live instead with his wife's family. This system, along with the centralised chieftainship itself and virilocal residence, is generally traced to the era of Mulowoka's settlement and, still more, to the Ngoni invasion: the Ngoni, a war-oriented society, required the full payment of bridewealth and the movement of a wife to her husband's home partly to retain sons as warriors, since marrying them into other households would have reduced the number of men available to fight.

Marriage among the Tumbuka traditionally proceeds through a sequence of payments and stages rather than a single transaction. A man first pays the woman chikhole (from kukola, "to hold" or "catch"), a payment that formalises the couple's commitment though it does not itself constitute a binding contract; her family uses it to buy items she will take to her husband's home, such as baskets, pots, cloth and basins, with the amount set by the woman's paternal aunt. The man's father then appoints a go-between, or thenga, to negotiate with the woman's family, historically only after making enquiries into her character and conduct. Once these preliminaries are settled, the woman's family requires chiwanda (also mizimu), a payment, traditionally a cow, ritually slaughtered and shared among her patrilineal relatives so that the ancestors will watch over her marriage; failure to distribute the chiwanda properly can later cost the woman the support of her paternal relatives if her marriage runs into difficulty. A further payment, mukhuzi wa nyina ("the mother's cloth"), goes to the bride's mother in recognition of having raised her. Only after these payments does the family demand bridewealth proper, or malowolo, historically paid in cattle and increasingly in cash; the Tumbuka regard this not as a commercial transaction but as compensation to the woman's parents for raising her. A marriage without bridewealth is not considered fully recognised, and the matter can be brought before traditional or modern courts alike, which generally rule in favour of the woman's family; a couple who marry without her parents' knowledge commit what is called chikumu (elopement), for which the man can be sued and made to pay a fine, chibadala, before completing the customary payments.

Failure to complete these payments, particularly chiwanda, carries lasting consequences: children born to a marriage lacking this payment are considered to belong to their mother's lineage rather than their father's, and a woman married without full bridewealth may be buried, on her death, in her own home village rather than her husband's. Where a married man dies, his widow may be inherited by a brother or another appointed relative under a custom known as chokolo.

=== Personal names ===
Among the Tumbuka, a child's first name is bestowed only after the umbilical cord has detached, traditionally by the father and the paternal grandfather; paternal uncles, aunts or other elderly relatives on the father's side may name a child instead if the usual name-givers have died, have been long absent, or are under suspicion after several children they named have died in succession, a pattern attributed to witchcraft. Because Tumbuka society is patrilineal, and children are considered to belong to the father's lineage, naming responsibility rests with men.

Personal names function as compressed records of the circumstances of a child's birth, and researchers have grouped them into recurring themes. Names such as Kamunkhwala ("little medicine") and Chimika ("mixed [herbs]") mark a first-born child conceived after a couple sought treatment for infertility or miscarriage, while Fumbani ("ask [me]") answers the mockery a woman may have faced during a long period of childlessness. Other names comment on marital disputes: Chabudikha ("it has collapsed") marks a birth following conflict within a marriage, Chimbizgani ("threaten/intimidate") a child born amid threats of divorce, and Jumbani ("complicate" or "endanger") a birth shadowed by suspected infidelity during pregnancy. Names such as Sekelele ("rejoice") and Kondwani ("be happy") mark a birth as a source of joy after past hardship.

A further set of names responds specifically to repeated child deaths in a family, daring death itself to strike again rather than expressing any wish for the child's harm: examples include Yizenge ("let it come"), Chifwenge ("let it die"), Lyaniso ("eat again," directed at suspected witches), Chakufwa ("it is dead"), Malalo ("graveyard"), Kanyifwa ("little death") and Chiponde ("funeral"). Researchers who have studied these names argue that they represent a form of defiance rather than superstition for its own sake: by naming and addressing a child by such a name each day, the family is thought gradually to diminish death's power over it.

=== Subsistence and economy ===
The Tumbuka have traditionally lived in rural villages, or in dispersed clusters of related households, in rectangular thatched houses, each with a circular thatched granary and kitchen. Men traditionally spent much of their time in a part of the house called Mpara and women in Ntanganini; during the growing season, families would often disperse to live in isolated thatched houses close to the land under cultivation.

The primary staple crops today are maize, cassava, millet and beans, along with pumpkins, vegetables and fruits such as bananas and oranges, often grown by Tumbuka women, while men have more often worked as migrant labourers. Farming was traditionally done by hand with hoes; ox-drawn ploughs were introduced during colonial rule. Citemene, or slash-and-burn cultivation by small farmers, remains a practice among the Tumbuka today. Maize farming in Rumphi District, the historical centre of the Nkhamanga Kingdom, remains sensitive to disruptions in the government's subsidised-fertiliser programme: in January 2026, Paramount Chief Chikulamayembe publicly urged the government to speed up fertiliser deliveries after the district had received only a fraction of its allocation and many farmers, still recovering from a poor previous harvest, had been forced to plant late.

=== Proverbs and oral literature ===
Tumbuka oral literature includes an extensive body of proverbs, collected from the early twentieth century onward by missionary and colonial-era writers working with Tumbuka informants. T. Cullen Young recorded a set of these from the Nkhamanga area in 1931, and G. Meredith Sanderson published a further collection gathered around Karonga with the help of a local informant, Robert Mandere. Many of these proverbs use everyday rural imagery to comment on character and conduct: for example, Mazuwa ndiwo munene? Weya wang'ombe mphacoko ("Can you count the days? A cow's hairs are comparatively few") is used to note that no one can know what the future holds, while Pilipita wasepuka ndi mlomo ("In an argument, the young rely on their lips") observes that eloquence is often a person's best asset.

A parallel body of folktales, likewise recorded and analysed by later scholars, conveys moral and didactic lessons through animal characters and everyday situations, and forms part of the same oral tradition that shapes Tumbuka mythology.

== Traditional dances and ceremonies ==
=== Kulonga traditional ceremony ===
The Kulonga traditional ceremony is an annual harvest festival of the Tumbuka in Lundazi District, Eastern Province, Zambia, held under the leadership of Chief Mphamba and named after its central ritual, kulonga, in which the chief pours harvested foodstuffs into baskets, symbolising the storing of the harvest and giving thanks for food security. Held in August, the ceremony brings the community together for music, dance and celebration of Tumbuka culture and identity. Zambian president Hakainde Hichilema was among the notable attendees in 2024.

=== Vinkhakanimba traditional ceremony ===
The Vinkhakanimba Traditional Ceremony is an annual event of the Tumbuka held under Senior Chief Muyombe in Mafinga District, Muchinga Province, Zambia. Held between 15 and 28 September, it commemorates the Tumbuka's migration from Ujiji, in Tanzania, and honours their cultural heritage. Its dances include the mganda, a marching, military-inspired dance developed by Tumbuka men who had served in the British Army during the colonial period and brought home the drill styles they blended with traditional rhythm. The ceremony also gives community leaders a platform to address local concerns.

=== Vimbuza traditional dance ===
See Vimbuza and healing above for a discussion of the Vimbuza healing dance itself.

=== Zengani traditional ceremony ===
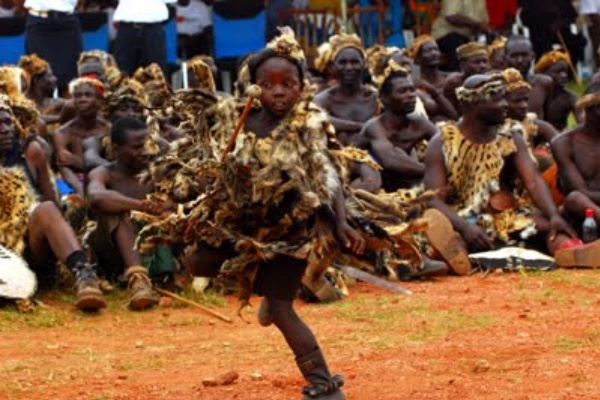
Zengani traditional dance among Tumbukas of Zambia.

The Zengani traditional ceremony is held annually, typically in October, for Tumbuka speakers of the Lundazi, Chasefu and Lumezi districts of Eastern Province, Zambia. Zengani means "bringing together two tribes", referring to the Ngoni and the Tumbuka, and the ceremony features dances including ingoma, vimbuza, muganda and chiwoda, attended by chiefs and other traditional leaders.

=== Kwenje traditional ceremony ===
The Kwenje traditional ceremony is an annual event of the Tumbuka in Chama District, Eastern Province, Zambia, held every October under Senior Chief Kambombo to mark the end of the harvest season and give thanks for the year's crops. Like the Vinkhakanimba ceremony, it features the mganda dance, and gives community leaders an occasion to address local issues.

=== Mtungo (Magali) dance ===
Mtungo, also called Magali, is a dance that originated among the Tumbuka of the Nkhamanga and Hewe areas of Rumphi District, northern Malawi, and is performed at beer gatherings by both men and women, often to songs with an educational purpose. Its main instrument is a gourd, partly filled with small stones and pierced with a small opening; the performer shakes it while alternately covering and uncovering the opening, producing sound variations that accompany the singing and clapping.

=== Ulumba ===
Ulumba is a dance of the Tumbuka of Hewe and Nkhamanga, Rumphi, performed by men to celebrate a hunter's bravery in killing large or dangerous game. Villagers mimic a charging animal through song and clapping while the hunter re-enacts the kill.

=== Mapenenga (Mganda/Malipenga) ===
Mapenenga, also called Malipenga, is a modern men's dance that originated among the Tumbuka before the group divided into its present sub-groups. Ex-servicemen developed it by adapting the military parade styles of the King's African Rifles. Malipenga first appeared in Nkhata Bay District among the Tonga sub-group and later spread across Malawi's Northern Region; a variant known as Mganda, inspired by the northern style, later developed in the Central Region.

=== Visekese ===
Visekese is a women's dance closely related to Chiwoda, practised by the Tumbuka in various parts of Northern Malawi and popularised by women of the Usisya area in Nkhata Bay District. Its name comes from the main instrument used: a thin wooden box, about the size of a large book, filled with pebbles or dry grain that rattle when shaken to keep rhythm.

== Festivals ==
=== Gonapamuhanya festival ===
The Gonapamuhanya festival is an annual cultural festival of the Tumbuka held in the Nkhamanga area of Rumphi District, northern Malawi. It commemorates Gonapamuhanya, the first Chikulamayembe chief to settle in the area where the chieftaincy is now based, at Bolero — the son of Mulowoka, founder of the Chikulamayembe line, whose habit of dozing in the sun after his midday meal gave him his name. All of Malawi's presidents have attended the festival at one time or another, and the event receives government financial sponsorship. It features the recounting of Tumbuka history and the lineage of the Chikulamayembe chiefs, alongside displays of economic activity and traditional dance.

At the 2025 festival, held under the theme "Culture and integrity: the backbone of development" and organised on a budget of about 153 million Malawian kwacha, organisers unveiled a tombstone at the Kadumuliro cultural site in Bolero marking the identified burial place of Chikulamayembe I, the dynasty's founding chief, an event the organising committee's chairperson, Jean Chilinda, presented as an opportunity for Tumbuka people to reconnect with their early history. The same festival, however, was disrupted on its second day by clashes between supporters of the reigning Paramount Chief Chikulamayembe, Joseph Bongololo Gondwe, and backers of Mtima Gondwe in the long-running succession dispute described above; young men from Mtima Gondwe's side threw stones at vehicles, and police used tear gas to disperse the crowd, with the disturbance spreading into a residential area near the late paramount chief's house.

=== Mulindafwa festival ===
Mulindafwa is a festival of the Tumbuka of Hewe, in Rumphi, that commemorates the migration of their ancestor, the first Katumbi, who crossed Lake Malawi to settle in Hewe and was recognised as a chief in his own right, independent of the Chikulamayembe. The ceremony recounts the history of the Katumbi lineage and displays a symbolic stone said to have come from Kapiri Nthemba; oral tradition holds that Katumbi rested on this stone after climbing a hill he later named Themba Hill (originally Romani Hill), and the stone is regarded among the Tumbuka of Hewe as a symbol of authority.

== See also ==
- Tumbuka language
- Tumbuka mythology
- Chikulamayembe Dynasty
- History of the Tumbuka people
