= Chamanyavyose Chiefdom =

Traditional chiefdom of the Botawota clan in eastern Zambia

- c. 1470–1964 (fragmented traditional authority continues)
- Status: Chiefdom
- Capital: Chamanyavyose Village (present-day Chama Boma)
- Common languages: Tumbuka
- Religion: Traditional African religion
- Government: Traditional monarchy (chiefdom)
  - c. 1470–?: Nyanjagha Chamanyavyose Botawota
  - 1780–1800: Fwasani Chasweka Musolomoka Botawota
  - c. 1800: Kanabeza Musolomoka Bota
  - ?–1964: Davide Mukondo Mulindanyifwa Bota
  - 1997–2002: Zakaria Chidosa Bota
- History
  - Establishment under Nyanjagha Chamanyavyose Botawota: c. 1470
  - Death of Chief Davide Mukondo Mulindanyifwa Bota during the Lenshina Uprising: 1964 (fragmented traditional authority continues)
- Today part of: Zambia

The Chamanyavyose Chiefdom is a Tumbuka political and kinship-based chiefdom associated with the Botawota clan, located in what is today eastern Zambia, near the borderlands with Malawi. Oral traditions link its origins to early migrations and settlement formations in the wider Tumbuka–Bisa–Senga cultural region.

The chiefdom is known for its long lineage of rulers, its association with early migration traditions connected to Mount Hora, and its later interactions with Senga groups and colonial-era administrative changes.

== Background ==
=== Origins ===
The Chamanyavyose polity traces its origins to Nyanjagha Chamanyavyose (meaning “the one who knows everything,” popularly known as Chama), who was a son of M'nyanjagha Longwe, the early ruler of the M'nyanjagha state.

Before Longwe became the first M'nyanjagha king of the Tumbuka Kingdom, Chamanyavyose broke away from his father. The separation is traditionally explained as resulting from family conflict, including alleged mistreatment of his mother. Chamanyavyose, together with his mother and supporters from various clans, left Kacheche (the early royal settlement of Longwe) in search of new territory. The migrating group moved westward across several hills, eventually reaching the Nyika Plateau and later descending into the Luangwa Valley. After a period in the valley, they continued northward as far as Kamphumbu in present-day northern Zambia.

At Kamphumbu, some members of the group adopted associations with local chiefly structures, including the Katyetye royal line. However, for political reasons, the group later abandoned Kamphumbu and returned toward the Luangwa Valley. Key clan leaders in the migration included Mungwalala, Mungulube, Nchuka, Chikontha, Chizembe, and Chilumanga.

No members of Chamanyavyose’s group are reported to have settled permanently on the west bank of the Luangwa River; instead, settlements were established on the eastern side.

After crossing the Luangwa River, the group dispersed into several sub-divisions. The Chikontha division of the Nyimbili (Kubona) clan settled in a fertile valley rich in game, becoming the northernmost area of the chiefdom. Other groups settled in the middle Luwumbu River valley (modern Sitwe), while the Nehuka group of the Chilembo clan settled in the upper Luwumbu River area.

The Chikontha and Nchuka sub-chiefs shared a boundary at Mphemba in present-day Muyombe, marking early territorial organization within the emerging Chamanyavyose political structure.

=== Expansion of the Chiefdom (c. 1470–1500) ===
According to oral traditions, the establishment and expansion of the Chamanyavyose Chiefdom took place over several stages following the migration of Chief Chamanyavyose and his followers from the territory of M'nyanjagha Longwe. The initial movement toward the Luangwa Valley and Kamphumbu is said to have taken approximately five years, followed by another period of about five years before permanent settlement and consolidation in the Luangwa Valley.

Based on this reconstruction, the expansion of the chiefdom is dated to around 1470, with the process of territorial consolidation continuing for approximately fifteen years.

The capital (musumba) of the chiefdom was established at Chamanyavyose Village, identified with the present-day Chama Boma. From this centre, Chief Chamanyavyose Botawota expanded his authority over a wide region.

At its height during this early phase, the chiefdom is described as extending southwards as far as Luambe on the Lumimba River, and northwards toward areas near present-day Chitunda. Expansion also reached eastward into neighbouring chiefdom territories, forming a broad but loosely administered political landscape.

== Early succession ==
By the late 18th century, leadership included Fwasani Chasweka Musolomoka Botawota, also known as Mutayachalo Botawota. His reign (c. 1780–1800) is remembered for conflict and the eventual loss of authority to Senga groups.

After 1800, succession became fragmented, with leadership passing through multiple members of the Botawota lineage, including Kanabeza Musolomoka Bota, Mutule Bota, Mulyawima, Chote Bota, Zelu, Chizowe Bota, Chaipa Bota, and Chenyentha (Salu) Chafumilankhu.

Several of these rulers were connected through nephew-based or collateral kinship succession, indicating a flexible inheritance system. The chiefdom is also associated with surnames found among related lineages such as Mhango, Kachale, Khonje, Chihana, Chondoka, Msiska, Mtonga, and others.

== Modern period ==
In the colonial and post-colonial period, the chiefdom continued under recognized traditional authority structures. In August 1964, Chief Davide Mukondo Mulindanyifwa Bota was killed during the Lenshina Uprising in Zambia. He was succeeded in September 1964 by Chakujuma Mung’ombwa Bota. Later rulers included Mateyo Lindiladongo Katyetye and January Chisulo Katyetye.

From 1997 to at least 2002, the chiefdom was led by Zakaria Chidosa Bota.

== See also ==
- Mount Hora
- History of the Tumbuka people
- Chikulamayembe dynasty
