= Timeline of Tumbuka history =

Chronology of major events in the history of the Tumbuka people

This is a timeline of Tumbuka history, comprising important political, cultural, economic and social developments involving the Tumbuka people and the states they established in present-day Malawi, Zambia and Tanzania.

To read about the background to these events, see History of the Tumbuka people, M'nyanjagha Kingdom, Chikulamayembe dynasty and Tumbuka language.

== 15th century ==
Year	Date	Event	Source
Before 1400		A group of migrants, including the ancestors of the Tumbuka people, departed from the Luba Kingdom. The Tumbuka section of the migration was led by Mulonga Mbulalubilo under the overall leadership of Mudala.	
1410		Mudala, leader of the migrating group, died in an area south of present-day Tanzania bordering Zambia.	
Before 1415		Following the death of Mudala, the migrating group split into separate segments.	
1415		The Tumbuka section under Mulonga Mbulalubilo reached Kalonga.	
1430		Mulonga Mbulalubilo died at Kalonga.	
1435		A large section of the Tumbuka population at Kalonga dispersed into surrounding regions.	
1450		Tumbuka communities settled in many areas west and south of Kalonga and established numerous chiefdoms.	
c. 1450		The early M'nyanjagha Kingdom emerged under the rule of the Chikulamayembe dynasty.	
c. 1470		Establishment of the Chamanyavyose Chiefdom in the Chama region (present-day eastern Zambia) under Nyanjagha Chamanyavyose Botawota, a sub-king (Nyanjagha) of the Botawota clan. The name “Chama” later became associated with his leadership.	
1460		Longwe became the first king of the early M'nyanjagha Kingdom.	
c. 1480		Ironworking, agriculture, and long-distance trade strengthened centralized authority among the Tumbuka.	
1490		Longwe died at an advanced age.	

== 16th century ==
Year	Date	Event	Source
1500		Chewa migrants passed through Kalonga and encountered established Tumbuka communities.	
c. 1500		Chewa migrations reached Kalonga and interacted with Tumbuka settlements.	
1520		Under M'nyanjagha Kazandukha, the kingdom reached its maximum territorial extent.	
16th century		Expansion of the M'nyanjagha Kingdom over northern Malawi and parts of eastern Zambia.	
16th century		Growth of trade routes linking the Tumbuka with the East African coast and the Luangwa Valley.	

== 17th century ==
Year	Date	Event	Source
Early 1600s		The M'nyanjagha Kingdom reached its political peak.	
1600		Chewa expansion began northward into Tumbuka territory.	
Mid-1600s		Ivory, iron, and agricultural trade became central to regional economy.	
Late 1600s		Consolidation of authority under the Chikulamayembe dynasty.	

== 18th century ==
Year	Date	Event	Source
1750		Chewa settlements became established south of Tumbuka territories.	
c. 1770		Transition from the M'nyanjagha Kingdom to the centralized Chikulamayembe Kingdom.	
1770		Balowoka groups entered Nkhamanga and Rumphi areas.	
1780		Bisa groups entered Chama region and interacted with Chamanyavyose Chiefdom structures.	
1780–1800		Rule of Fwasani Chasweka Musolomoka Botawota (Mutayachalo Botawota) in Chamanyavyose Chiefdom. His reign ended with the loss of control to Senga groups.	
Late 1700s		Expansion of trade networks toward the Swahili Coast and central Africa under Chikulamayembe rulers.	

== 19th century ==
Year	Date	Event	Source
Early 1800s		Continued prosperity of the Chikulamayembe Kingdom through ivory trade.	
From 1800		Succession in Chamanyavyose Chiefdom under Kanabeza Musolomoka Bota, followed by Mutule Bota, Mulyawima, Chote Bota, Zelu, Chizowe Bota, Chaipa Bota, and Chenyentha (Salu) Chafumilankhu, reflecting fragmented kinship-based leadership.	
1830s–1840s		Ngoni migrations under Zwangendaba reached northern Malawi.	
1850		Bemba invasions affected northern Tumbuka regions.	
1850s		Increased slave raiding destabilized regional politics.	
1855		Ngoni settlement under M’mbelwa I in northern regions.	
1859		David Livingstone documented the region.	
1860s		Arab-Swahili traders intensified ivory trade activity around Lake Malawi.	
c. 1870		Decline of the Chikulamayembe Kingdom due to invasions and trade disruptions.	
1878		Livingstonia Mission established Christian and educational influence.	
1890		British colonial entry into the region.	
1891		Establishment of the British Central Africa Protectorate.	
Late 1890s		Restoration of Chikulamayembe chieftaincy under indirect rule.	

== 20th century ==
Year	Date	Event	Source
Early August 1964		Death of Davide Mukondo Mulindanyifwa Bota, Chamanyavyose chief.	
September 1964		Succession of Chakujuma Mung’ombwa Bota as chief.	
1964		Further leadership transitions under Mateyo Lindiladongo Katyetye and January Chisulo Katyetye.	
1907		Renaming of the British Central Africa Protectorate to Nyasaland.	
1915		Chilembwe uprising.	
1953		Formation of the Federation of Rhodesia and Nyasaland.	
1963		Dissolution of the Federation.	
1964		Malawi independence.	
1966		Malawi becomes a republic.	
1994		Introduction of multiparty democracy.	
Late 20th century		Revival of Tumbuka language and cultural identity.	

== 21st century ==
Year	Date	Event	Source
1997–2002		Reign of Zakaria Chidosa Bota as Chamanyavyose chief.	
2000s		Cultural preservation initiatives for the Tumbuka language.	
2008		Tumbuka language reintroduced on Malawi Broadcasting Corporation radio.	
2010s		Expansion of digital Tumbuka media presence.	
2020s		Increased academic research on Tumbuka history and kingdoms.	
