= Ngonde people =

Tumbuka ethnic group

Nkhonde people (Ngonde)
Nkhonde / Ngonde
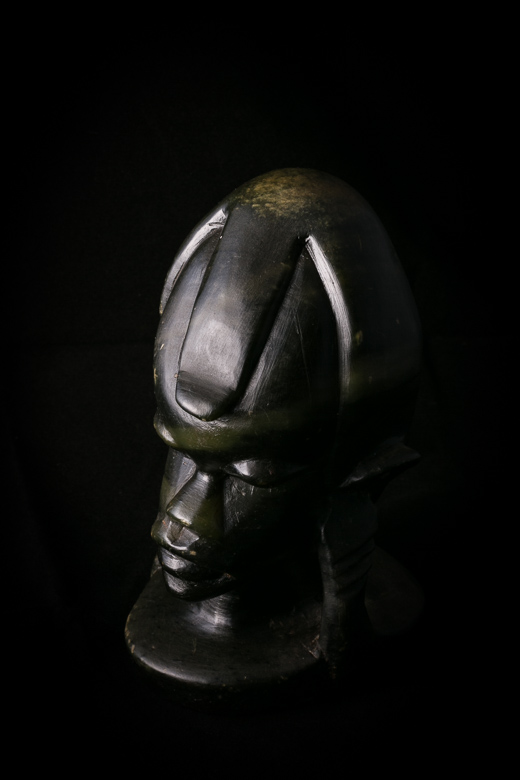
- A carving depicting the younger leader Mulonga Mbulalubilo from whom the Nkhonde (Ngonde) sub ethnic group emerged

Total population
- 150,000 (2024 estimate)

Regions with significant populations
- Northern Malawi (Karonga District), southern Tanzania

Languages
- Chingonde (Ngonde language)

Religion
- Traditional African religions, Christianity

Related ethnic groups
- Tumbuka people, Lambya people, Sukwa people

The Ngonde people (also spelled Nkhonde) are a Tumbuka Bantu ethnic group of the larger Tumbuka group found in Karonga District and southern Tanzania, centred in Karonga District. The Nkhonde originated as a branch of the early Tumbuka people who emerged from the original Tumbuka group that migrated from Luba Kingdom in the early fifteenth century.

== History ==
=== Origins ===
The history of the Nkhonde (Ngonde) begins with the migration of the original Tumbukas from Luba migration, a group that broke away from the eastern Luba Kingdom under the leadership of Mulonga Mbulalubilo in the early fifteenth century. The original breakaway groups from the Luba migration included the Tumbuka, Hehe, Gogo and Mwakyusa peoples. The group was led by the senior mutemi Mudala, while the Tumbuka division was under the leadership of Mulonga Mbulalubilo. Following Mudala's death in southern Tanzania around 1410, disputes over succession caused the larger migration to divide. The Hehe and Gogo settled in central Tanzania, while the Mwakyusa remained in southern Tanzania. Mulonga Mbulalubilo led the remaining group eastwards towards the Songwe River and Lake Malawi. After moving through southern Tanzania, the group eventually settled at Kalonga, in what is today Karonga District in northern Malawi. It is at this settlement that the wider community began to divide into subbranches due to population growth and internal developments. One branch, associated with Kalonga wa Nkhonde, remained in the Karonga area and developed into the Nkhonde (Ngonde) people, later forming the Kingdom of Kyungu. The other major branch, associated with Kalonga wa Songwe, moved into other parts of northern Malawi and Zambia through descendants such as Mukamanga, Botawota, and Longwe, eventually giving rise to the M’nyanjagha royal line and the wider Tumbuka Kingdom.

==== Rulers, leaders and groups ====
The ancestral history of the Nkhonde (Ngonde) and Tumbuka peoples can be presented as a structured ancestral sequence beginning with the Luba Kingdom origin and continuing through migration, settlement, and later division at Kalonga (Karonga).

Mukamanga (Nkhamanga founder figure)
Settlement at Kalonga (present-day Karonga District, Malawi)
Kaunga (Nyirenda / Katungambizi branch)
Original Tumbukas from Luba (Batumbuka kwa Luba migration group (early 1400s))
Botawota (Nyanjagha Botawota / Katungambizi I)
Kalonga wa Nkhonde branch
Longwe Botawota (first M’nyanjagha king)
Luba Kingdom (Democratic Republic of Congo)
Kazanduka (Ntuntika, second M’nyanjagha king)
Kalonga wa Songwe branch
Royal Tumbuka lineage (Mbuluko, Jalila, Chite, Tafwauli, Chamanyavyose, Chizgowi)
Mulonga Mbulalubilo (migration Tumbuka leader)
Expansion into Nkhamanga, Henga Valley, Mzimba, Chama, Lundazi, and Bua River region
Nkhonde (Ngonde) people → Chiefdom of Kyungu

=== Settlement in Karonga ===
Mulonga Mbulalubilo's followers settled in the Kalonga area of present-day Karonga District around 1415. Archaeological evidence from Mbande Hill indicates occupation of the area between 1410 and 1480. One of Mulonga Mbulalubilo's sons became known as Kalonga wa Songwe, while his elder brother came to be known as Kalonga wa Nkhonde. Kalonga wa Nkhonde had many children and his descendants became successful cultivators of rice and bananas. Because of their agricultural prosperity, they increased rapidly in number and eventually became known as the children of Nkhonde. From this lineage emerged the Nkhonde ethnic division.

=== Dispersal of the Tumbuka ===
Population growth around Kalonga led many groups to leave the area after about 1435. The descendants of Kalonga wa Songwe spread southwards, westwards and south-westwards into what later became known as Utumbuka. Among the descendants of Kalonga wa Songwe were Kayazga and Malikwata. Kayazga's son Mukamanga gave his name to the Nkhamanga region. His descendants, known collectively as the Bakamanga, settled in western Rumphi, Nkhamanga, Mzimba, Chama, Lundazi and territories extending southwards to the Bua River. Mukamanga's eldest son, Nyanjagha Botawota, fathered Longwe Botawota, who became the first M'nyanjagha (king) of the Tumbuka. Through Longwe and his descendants emerged the royal dynasty of the Tumbuka Kingdom. Other branches established themselves in Henga, Phoka, Mzuzu and neighbouring territories, laying the foundations of many present-day clans and chiefdoms.

== Chiefdom of Kyungu ==
While many descendants of Kalonga wa Songwe dispersed across northern Malawi and eastern Zambia, a significant population remained in Karonga. These communities later came under the authority of Kyungu, who established the Kingdom of Kyungu. According to traditions recorded by Monica and Godfrey Wilson, Kyungu recognised the people he found around Mbande Hill as the original owners of the land. The title Kyungu remains that of the paramount ruler of the Ngonde people.

== Relationship with the Tumbuka ==
The Nkhonde as descendants of both the Kalonga wa Songwe and Kalonga wa Nkhonde communities are branches of the original Tumbuka group. Over time, the descendants of Kalonga wa Nkhonde developed into a separate sub-ethnic identity, while maintaining close linguistic and cultural ties with the Tumbuka.

== Language ==
The Nkhonde speak Chingonde, a Bantu language closely related to Nyakyusa and sharing historical connections with Tumbuka.

== See also ==
- Tumbuka people
- History of the Tumbuka people
- M'nyanjagha Kingdom
- Karonga District
