= History of the Tumbuka people =

Tumbuka people
Total population
- approx. 7.5 million

Regions with significant populations
- Northern Malawi (Rumphi, Mzimba, Karonga); Eastern Zambia; Southwestern Tanzania

Languages
- Tumbuka; English

Religion
- Christianity (Protestantism, Catholicism); Traditional African religion

Related ethnic groups
- Henga; Ngonde; Tonga (Malawi); Yombe; Ngoni; Manda; Senga

History of the Tumbuka people covers the origins, political development, culture, and modern transformations of the Tumbuka people, one of the major Bantu-speaking ethnic groups of Malawi, Zambia, southwestern Tanzania and Zimbabwe. The Tumbuka are known for their cultural heritage, kinship systems, and the historical Nkhamanga Kingdom and Chikulamayembe dynasty that once united the northern region of Malawi.

== History and origin ==
=== Origin ===
The Tumbuka were part of the earliest waves of Bantu immigrants from the Proto-Bantu center in the Kola region of the Democratic Republic of Congo. They originated from the Luba portion of the Luba Empire under Mwaa Yamvo. The Tumbuka migrated together with the Hehe, Gogo, and Mwakyusa in the early 1400s, leaving because they resisted the menial work imposed by their leaders.

=== From the split in Southern Tanzania to Kalonga ===
Mudala's death caused disputes, leading to the split of the group into three branches by 1415. The Gogo and Hehe moved north to central Tanzania, while the Mwakyusa remained in southern Tanzania. The Tumbuka, led by Mulonga Mbulalubilo, continued east, eventually discovering a small stream, later named Songwe, flowing into Lake Malawi Mulonga's son, Kalonga wa Songwe, was born there, and the settlement became known as Kalonga, a name still in use today.

The Tumbuka settled in Kalonga (Karonga District) around 1415, living there for about twenty years until Mulonga Mbulalubilo died around 1430. Archaeological excavations at Mbande Hill in Karonga District confirm settlements in the area between 1410 and 1480. Later, Kyungu (Chungu) arrived and found the Nkhonde (Ngonde) people settled there, integrating them into the broader Tumbuka population.

=== Birth of Ngonde ethnic group ===
Population growth led to gradual dispersals from Kalonga in three directions: west, south, and east. Kalonga wa Songwe’s elder brother, Kalonga wa Nkhonde, married five wives and cultivated rice and bananas, forming the Nkhonde ethnic division. Some of his group later migrated westward, settling in the mountains between Kalonga and the Isoka–Nakonde corridor, forming smaller Tumbuka groups including Tambo, Nyika, Wandya, Wenya, Fungwe, and Lambya.

=== Birth of Manda ethnic group ===
Another division moved east to the western shore of Lake Malawi, becoming the Manda group, while some under Kalonga wa Songwe moved south and southwest.

==== Birth of Malawi Tonga sub ethnic group ====
Those remaining at Kalonga renamed their senior leader Karonga, giving rise to the Lakeshore Tonga through intermarriage and merging of other sub Tumbuka ethnic groups.

===== Tumbuka group =====
The term Batumbuka kwa Luba originally described the group as those who broke off from the Luba Kingdom, later simplified to Tumbuka, giving the ethnic group its current name. By around 1435, significant dispersal had begun across what would become Utumbuka, the land of the Tumbuka. Kalonga wa Songwe had two sons, Kayazga (Ntambwe) and Malikwata, from whom most Tumbuka clans trace their lineage. (Note: Kalonga wa Songwe’s sons, Kayazga (Ntambwe) and Malikwata, form the basis of major Tumbuka clans)

== The dispersal of the Tumbuka from Kalonga ==
From 1435, the Tumbuka left Kalonga in several directions to find new farmland. Kayazga eventually settled southwest in a valley full of coconut trees, where his son Mukama was born, forming the Kumanga clan. Notable sons included Nyanjagha Botawota (Katungambizi I), Kaunga, and Mutimbula (Luhanga).

Malikwata's descendants, Mwaphoka and Mwahenga, settled east and west of the Livingstone Mountains (Mumbwe/Khondowe) and in Henga Valley, Rumphi, and Mzuzu, respectively. Mukamanga taught strategic practices, such as entering caves backwards to mislead enemies. Nyanjagha Botawota's children formed the foundation of Tumbuka leadership, with Longwe becoming the first M’nyanjagha (king).

The Bakamanga (children of Mukamanga) spread across western Lumphi, Nkhamanga, central/northern/western Kathibi (later Mzimba), present-day Lundazi and Chama districts in Zambia, and lands south to the Bua River. Kaunga's descendants settled in Kapolo, Muzokoto, Kawiya, and further southwest at Tchili (Tchilighilo) under the Kadono group of the Nyirenda clan. (Note: Kathibi, later renamed Mzimba by the Ngoni, was originally called Kathibi; Mzimba means “body” from the phrase ‘Tiyogeza mzimba mumufuleni’) (Note: Nkhamanga means ‘land of the Bakamanga’, ‘land of coconut trees’, or ‘land of the Kamanga of the Tumbuka group from the Bakamanga clan’) (Note: Brelsford, W. V., The Tribes of Zambia (Lusaka: Government Printer, 1956), p. 90. See Map 16 for areas where Chi-Tumbuka is still spoken in the former Tumbuka Kingdom)

== The original Tumbuka Kingdom ==
The Tumbuka Kingdom was established by Longwe I, son of Nyanjagha Botawota. Botawota was the first Nyanjagha, named for hiding (ku botama) in nyanjagha trees. Longwe I became the first M’nyanjagha, meaning “owner of the other Nyanjaghas”, ruling over the initial Tumbuka chiefdoms in the north. (Note: Eventually, the name Nyanjagha meant ‘chief’, and M’nyanjagha meant ‘king’, the overall ruler of the Tumbuka Kingdom) (Note: Young, Notes on the History of the Tumbuka–Kamanga Peoples in the Northern Province of Nysaland, pp. 56–80) (Note: Macpherson, Fergus, Seminar–Workshop on Oral Records of Local History, Lundazi, 24–25 June 1972 (Lusaka: Kenneth Kaunda Foundation, 1973))

Each Nyanjagha governed a large territory with sub-Nyanjaghas called vilolo and senior headmen (Kapole) overseeing multiple villages. Village headmen (fumu za mu mizi) managed local communities. Councillors (yinthini) advised leaders at all levels on political, social, economic, and cultural matters.

Nyanjagha Chamanyavyose, son of Longwe I, established a chiefdom in the Luangwa Valley, extending from Luambe to Chikontha and Sitwe in present-day Chama District after 1460. (Note: The Tumbuka had four types of traditional leaders: village chief (fumu ya mu muzi); group village headman (fumu ya chigaba); senior or paramount king (fumu yowusa mafumu yose na malo uwo); and other sub-chiefs assisting at various levels) Some of the traditional dances that originated in the era include Vimbuza dance.

== See also ==
- Tumbuka people
