= Karonga District =

District of Malawi

Coordinates: 10°00′S 33°45′E

- District
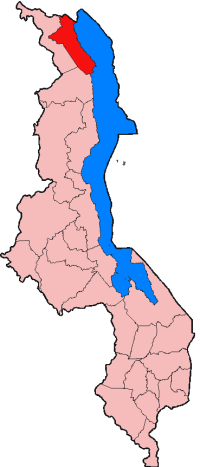
- Lake Malawi shoreline near Karonga
- Interactive map of Karonga District
- Country: Malawi
- Region: Northern Region
- Early settlement tradition: c. 1400s (Kalonga settlement phase)
- Capital: Karonga
- Time zone: CAT (UTC+2)

Karonga District is a district in the Northern Region of Malawi, situated along the north-eastern shoreline of Lake Malawi (Lake Nyasa) and bordering Tanzania to the north. The district is associated with the broader history of the Tumbuka people migration. Chitumbuka is the lingua franca and major language spoken in the district and is also the second language of several other ethnic groups in the district such as the Ngonde people, among others. The majority of the population are mainly the Tumbuka people whose remnats are Ngonde people (migrants from Tanzania).

The district covers an area of 3,355 km.² and has a population of 465,334 (2025 estimate).

== Geography ==
Karonga District lies in a narrow ecological corridor between Lake Malawi to the east and the Livingstone Mountains to the west. The district includes fertile floodplains, river valleys, and upland escarpments.

Major geographical features include Lake Malawi shoreline (eastern boundary), Songwe River (northern boundary with Tanzania), North Rukuru River system, Mbande Hill archaeological site, and Nkhamanga-Karonga transitional valley system.

== Early history and settlements ==
=== Original inhabitants ===
The earliest structured population movement into Karonga District is linked to the original Tumbuka migration group. The group originated from the eastern Luba–Lunda cultural sphere in present-day Democratic Republic of Congo during the early fifteenth century.

The migration, led by Mulonga Mbulalubilo who was a Tumbuka leader, moved eastwards through what is now southern Tanzania, crossing river systems including the Lualaba and settling temporarily near Lake Mweru-wa-Ntipa before continuing toward the Lake Malawi basin.

=== Settlement at Kalonga (Karonga) ===
By approximately the early fifteenth century, the Tumbuka group reached and settled in the Kalonga area (modern Karonga District). This settlement phase represents a foundational period in the region’s political and demographic history.

Kalonga as a central settlement where leadership structures were organized under batemi (leaders), and where early social divisions began to emerge.

Archaeological evidence from Mbande Hill supports the presence of settled communities in the region between approximately 1410 and 1480 CE.

== Formation of Nkhonde and Tumbuka branches ==
Following population growth and increasing settlement pressure at Kalonga, the community gradually divided into two principal historical branches.

=== Kalonga wa Nkhonde branch ===
The Tumbuka Kalonga wa Nkhonde lineage remained in the Karonga region and developed into the Nkhonde (Ngonde) people. Over time, this group established a centralized political system under the Kyungu dynasty.

Ethnographic records by Monica Wilson and Godfrey Wilson note that the Kyungu authority encountered established populations already considered indigenous to the area.

=== Kalonga wa Songwe branch ===
The Tumbuka Kalonga wa Songwe lineage migrated southwards and westwards into the wider northern Malawi plateau. Through a series of descendants including Mukamanga, Kaunga, Botawota, and Longwe, this branch formed the M’nyanjagha Kingdom and later the Tumbuka Kingdom.

This branch is associated with:

- Nkhamanga valley settlement system
- Expansion into Henga Valley, Rumphi, and Mzimba
- Formation of chieftaincy structures under the M’nyanjagha title
- Clan diversification across northern Malawi and eastern Zambia

== Government and administrative divisions ==
There are five National Assembly constituencies in Karonga:

- Karonga - Central
- Karonga - North
- Karonga - North West
- Karonga - Nyungwe
- Karonga - South

Since the 2009 election, Karonga Nyungwe has been represented by an Alliance for Democracy politician, and the other seats are held by members of the Democratic Progressive Party.

== Demographics ==
=== Ethnic groups ===
At the time of the 2024 Census of Malawi, the distribution of the population of Karonga District by ethnic group was as follows:

- 75.4% Tumbuka
- 15.3% Ngonde
- 5.9% Sukwa
- 3.6% Lambya
- 2.5% Others

=== Languages ===
The main language spoken in the district is Chitumbuka. Other minority languages such as Nyakyusa and Lambya are also spoken in some areas, mainly by elder people, while the younger generation exalts to Chitumbuka. There are also a few speakers of Chindali and Chisukwa along the border with Chitipa District.

=== Religion ===
Religion in Karonga District (2018 Census)
Religion	Population	Percentage (%)
Catholic	63,816	17.48
Church of Central Africa Presbyterian	60,270	16.15
Seventh-day Adventist/ Baptist/ Apostolic	24,939	6.83
Anglican	5,798	1.59
Pentecostal	31,062	8.51
Other Christian Denominations	132,529	36.31
Islam	5,035	1.38
Traditional	2,649	0.73
Other Denomination	37,190	10.19
No Religion/Atheism	1,740	0.48
Total	365,028	100

== Cities and towns ==
- Karonga (capital)
- Chilumba
- Nyungwe

== Notable Malawians from Karonga ==
- Geoffrey Du Mhango
- Bazuka Mhango
- Richard Msowoya
- Russell Mwafulirwa
- Yatuta Chisiza
- Kyungu
