= Tumbuka subgroups and clans =

Subgroups and clans of the Tumbuka people

Tumbuka peoples
Total population
- Over 10.5 million (Tumbuka people collectively)

Regions with significant populations
- Malawi, Zambia, Tanzania (Mbeya Region), Zimbabwe

Languages
- Chitumbuka (various dialects)

Religion
- Christianity (various denominations), Traditional religion

Related ethnic groups
- Tonga, Nyika, Northern Ngoni, other Bantu peoples

Tumbuka subgroups and clans describe the internal social, linguistic and lineage divisions among the population of approximately 10 million Tumbuka people, a Bantu-speaking group primarily in Malawi, Zambia, Tanzania and Zimbabwe. These subgroups such as the Henga, Senga, Kamanga, Yombe, Tonga and clans have shaped settlement patterns, leadership, dialectal variation, and cultural identity.

== History ==
The Tumbuka trace their origins to the Bantu migrations. By the 14th century, they occupied the highlands of present-day northern and central Malawi, eastern and Muchinga Province of Zambia and southwestern Tanzania. Over time, many lineages organized into autonomous chiefdoms and later into larger polities such as the Nkhamanga Kingdom ruled by the Chikulamayembe dynasty.

== Language and dialects ==
The Tumbuka groups speak Chitumbuka, a Bantu language with many regional dialects tied to specific subgroups. Other subgroups such as the Tonga, Nyika, Fililwa and Northern Ngoni have maintained dialects but share long histories of interaction and intermarriage with the Tumbuka.

== Subgroups ==
=== Henga ===
The Henga are a Tumbuka subgroup found mainly in the Rumphi and Karonga District of Malawi and across the border in Zambia’s Lundazi District. They speak a Henga dialect of Chitumbuka, noted for its tonal variations. Traditionally, the Henga practiced mixed farming and were participants in the long-distance trade of the pre-colonial era.

=== Hewe ===
The Hewe inhabit the highlands of Rumphi District in northern Malawi. Known for their terraced agriculture and oral traditions, the Hewe maintain a dialect of Chitumbuka that preserves many features of the language.

=== Kamanga ===
The Kamanga people are usually regarded as the core of the Tumbuka ethnic identity, historically centered in present-day Rumphi, Mzimba, Karonga, Kasungu and extending into Zambia’s Lundazi, Lumezi, Chasefu, Isoka and parts of southern Tanzania. They speak standard Chitumbuka and were instrumental in the rise of the Nkhamanga Kingdom, which unified several Tumbuka chiefdoms.

=== Phoka ===
The Phoka live primarily in the Chitipa and Karonga districts of northern Malawi. Their Phoka dialect of Chitumbuka incorporates vocabulary influenced by neighbouring Nyika and Lambya groups. The Phoka are noted for their pottery traditions and clan-based social organization.

=== Senga ===
The Senga occupy areas of eastern Zambia adjacent to the main Tumbuka's group settlements, particularly in and around Chama District. Though they speak Chitumbuka language, Senga communities share the same historical ties and intermarriage with the main larger Tumbuka group, keep all surnames, culture and practices.

=== Tonga ===
The northern Tonga of Malawi trace their origins to a community that separated from the larger Tumbuka population during the era of the Nkhamanga Kingdom. This distinct identity is generally dated to the period after 1800–1900 AD, when several Tumbuka lineages migrated toward the western shores of Lake Malawi and established independent settlements, especially in today’s Nkhata Bay District. Although they developed the distinct Chitonga language, centuries of interaction have left strong cultural and linguistic ties to the Chitumbuka-speaking communities from which they emerged. Tonga society became known for lake-based fishing economies and elaborate drumming and dance traditions.

The table below lists major Tumbuka subgroups and historically linked neighbours.

Subgroups	Country	Province/Region	District	Primary language or dialect
Kamanga	Malawi, Zambia, Tanzania	Central and Northern Region (Malawi); Eastern and Muchinga provinces (Zambia); Mbeya Region (Tanzania)	Rumphi, Kasungu, Mzimba, Nkhotakota, Karonga (Malawi); Lundazi (Zambia)	Standard Chitumbuka (Kamanga variety)
Henga	Malawi, Zambia	Northern Region (Malawi); Eastern Province (Zambia)	Rumphi, Karonga (Malawi); Lundazi (Zambia); Lumezi (Zambia);Chama (Zambia); Chasefu (Zambia)	Henga dialect of Chitumbuka
Phoka people	Malawi	Northern Region	Chitipa, Karonga	Phoka dialect of Chitumbuka
Yombe	Malawi, Zambia	Northern Region (Malawi); Eastern Province (Zambia)	Mzimba (Malawi); Lundazi (Zambia)	Yombe dialect of Chitumbuka
Nthali	Malawi	Northern Region	Mzimba	Nthali dialect of Chitumbuka
Wenya	Malawi	Northern Region	Chitipa	Wenya dialect of Chitumbuka
Hewe	Malawi	Northern Region	Rumphi	Hewe dialect of Chitumbuka
Tonga	Malawi	Northern Region (Nkhata Bay)	Nkhata Bay	Chitonga dialect of Chitumbuka
Nyika	Malawi, Zambia	Northern Region (Malawi); Muchinga and Eastern Provinces (Zambia)	Chitipa (Malawi); Isoka, Mafinga (Zambia)	Chinyika dialect of Chitumbuka)
Fililwa	Malawi	Northern Region	Chitipa	Fililwa dialect of Chitumbuka
Northern Ngoni	Malawi	Northern Region (Mzimba)	Mzimba	Standard of Chitumbuka

== Clans and lineages ==
Within Tumbuka sub groups are clans tracing back to common ancestors. Notable Tumbuka clans include Mkandawire, Luhanga, Kachali, Kumwenda, Msowoya and Harawa. Clan leaders traditionally served as sub-chiefs, managed land and performed spiritual works.

== Political organization ==
Governance was historically decentralized, with village headmen and clan elders presiding over their groups. The Nkhamanga Kingdom and the Chikulamayembe dynasty introduced more centralized leadership.

== Marriage customs ==
Clans are traditionally exogamous, meaning people are expected not to marry within their own clan. These rules shaped marriage alliances, land rights and identity, though modern mobility has softened them.

== See also ==
- Tumbuka people
- Chitumbuka language
- Chikulamayembe dynasty
- Nkhamanga Kingdom
