= Hora Mountain =

Granite mountain in northern Malawi

Coordinates: 11°39′36″S 33°38′27″E

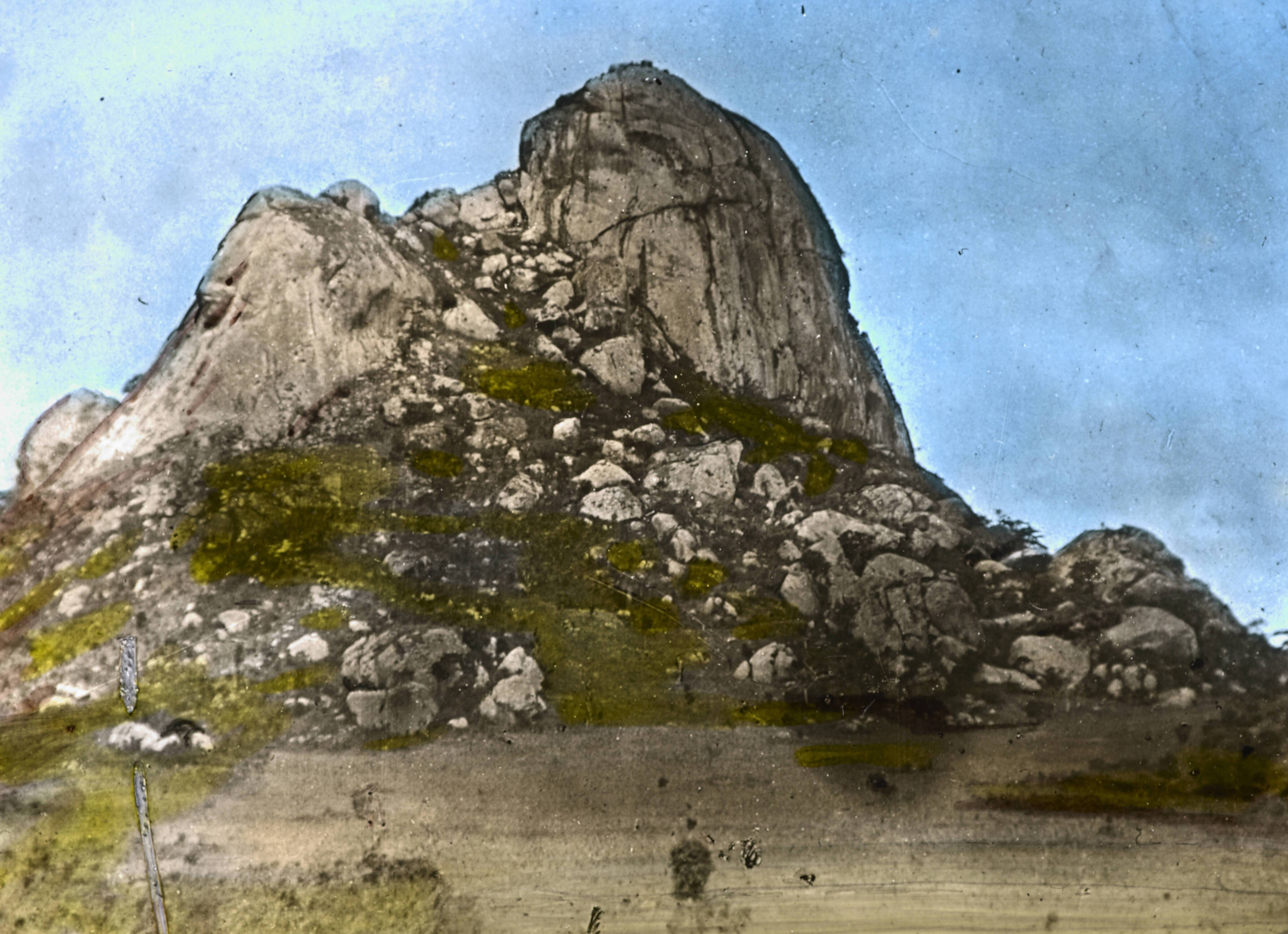
- Photograph taken around 1895

Geography

Mount Hora (also known as Hora Mountain) is a granite inselberg located in northern Malawi, rising abruptly above the surrounding plains in Mzimba District. The mountain is internationally known for the archaeological site at its base, Hora 1, which contains evidence of some of the earliest known human occupation in the region, including the oldest known cremation pyre in Africa.

The site has provided major insights into prehistoric hunter-gatherer societies in southeastern Africa, including complex mortuary rituals dating back approximately 9,500 years.

== Geography ==
Mount Hora is a granite mountain that rises steeply from a relatively flat plain in northern Malawi. Its exposed rock formations and natural overhangs provide shelter in several locations, including large rock shelters that were used by prehistoric populations.

== Ethnographic ==
Historically, the mountain is linked to the Tumbuka people who settled the place in the 15th century before arrival of any group. The mountain acted as a barrier against enemies. Many Tumbuka wars have been fought on the mountain.

According to A History of the Tumbuka from 1400 to 1900, some of the Tumbuka people clans of Kanyinji (Kayala), linked to the Dokowe lineage, traces to Mount Hora (Hola). After leaving the area, the group is said to have planted pumpkins along their migration route, giving rise to the name “Matanje” (pumpkins). The clan remembers a lineage sequence of Mbibe Kanyinji (senior), Wayihola (Nkulande), and Kaponthoka (junior), and preserves a praise saying describing Kayala as a “gourd, container of wealth,” symbolizing mobility during migration. The same source also lists related surnames among descendants of Kalonga wa Songwe and Kalonga wa Nkhonde, including Mhango, Kachale, Khonje, Chihana, Chondoka, Msiska, and Mtonga. One major sheltered area at the base of the mountain is large enough to accommodate dozens of people and has been a focal point of archaeological investigation.

=== Missionary activity ===
Early missionary work in Tumbuka territory was led by the Free Church of Scotland’s Livingstonia Mission. While the first station was established at Hoho (near Njuyu Hill) in 1882 by James Sutherland and William Koyi Mtusane, Mount Hora also became an important later mission site. A mission station was established at Hora in 1893 by Peter McCallum and Dr Steele. The site formed part of the wider Livingstonia Mission network, which expanded Christian teaching and medical and educational work across northern Malawi. Other missionaries associated with the region during the late nineteenth and early twentieth centuries included Elmslie (Ekwendeni, 1889), James Stewart, Dr Laws, Frederick Moir, Dr Fraser, and T. Cullen Young.

== Archaeology ==
=== Hora 1 site ===
The best-studied archaeological site on Mount Hora is known as Hora 1. First excavated in the 1950s, it was initially identified as a hunter-gatherer burial site. Renewed excavations between 2016 and 2019 under the Malawi Ancient Lifeways and Peoples Project significantly expanded understanding of the site. Evidence indicates that humans occupied the site as early as 21,000 years ago, with burials and ritual activity continuing between approximately 8,000 and 16,000 years ago.

=== Oldest known cremation pyre in Africa ===
In 2026, researchers reported the discovery of burned human bone fragments and ash deposits at Hora 1, identifying them as the oldest known cremation pyre in Africa, dating to approximately 9,500 years ago.

The cremated remains belonged to a woman aged between 18 and 60 years, who was under 5 feet (1.5 m) tall. The remains were found in a large ash mound beneath a rock overhang at the base of Mount Hora. Key findings include evidence of a large cremation fire requiring about 30 kg of dry wood fuel, temperatures exceeding 500°C during burning, fire duration likely lasting several hours to days, presence of stone tools placed within the pyre as possible funerary offerings and cut marks on bones suggesting removal of flesh before cremation. Researchers ruled out cannibalism, noting that bone modification patterns differed from those on animal remains at the site. The absence of skull and teeth fragments suggests that parts of the body may have been removed before cremation, possibly reflecting complex funerary rituals.

== Research history ==
Mount Hora was first excavated in the 1950s during a period when archaeological methods in the region were limited and documentation was incomplete. The site was revisited in modern scientific studies beginning in 2016, which incorporated radiocarbon dating, forensic anthropology, and sediment analysis.

The 2026 study published in Science Advances brought international attention to the site and significantly revised understanding of early mortuary behavior in Africa.

== See also ==
- Prehistory of Malawi
- Hunter-gatherer
- Archaeology of Africa
- Cremation
