= Tumbuka Kingdom =

Former country

Tumbuka Kingdom Ufumu wa Batumbuka
- c. 1400s–1870s
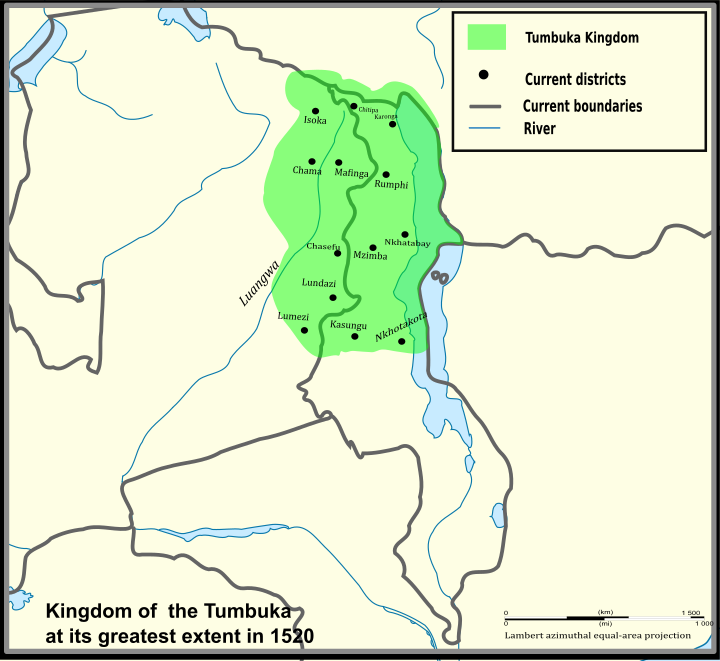
- The Tumbuka Kingdom at its greatest extent c. 1520
- Status: Pre-colonial kingdom
- Royal capital: Bolero
- Largest Capital: Bolero, Malawi
- Official languages: Tumbuka
- Ethnic groups: Tumbuka
- Religion: Traditional African religion
- Demonym: Tumbukan
- Government: Monarchy
  - M'nyanjagha: Longwe Botawota
  - Sekuru: Mlowoka
  - Chikulamayembe I: Gonapamuhanya
  - Chikulamayembe II: Kampungu
  - Chikulamayembe III: Pitamkusa
  - Chikulamayembe IV: Bwati I (Cayeka)
  - Chikulamayembe V: Bwati II
  - Chikulamayembe VI: Bamantha
  - Chikulamayembe VII: Mkuwayira
  - Chikulamayembe VIII: Mujuma
- History
  - Migration from the Luba Kingdom: early 1400s
  - Established: 15th century
  - Settlement between the Luangwa Valley and Lake Malawi: 15th century
  - Foundation of the M'nyanjagha Kingdom: c. 15th century
  - Arrival of the Balowoka from Unyamwezi: 1770–1780
  - Establishment of the Chikulamayembe dynasty: c. 1805
  - Collapse following Ngoni invasions: 1870s 1870s
Preceded by	Succeeded by
Luba Kingdom	Jere Ngoni Kingdom
- Today part of: Malawi, Zambia, Tanzania
- The kingdom developed in two principal phases: the decentralized M'nyanjagha Kingdom (c. 15th century–1770s) and the more centralized Chikulamayembe dynasty (c. 1805–1870s), founded by descendants of Balowoka traders from Unyamwezi. Its authority extended from the Songwe River in the north to the Dwangwa River in the south, and from Lake Malawi in the east to the Luangwa Valley in the west.

The Tumbuka Kingdom was a pre-colonial state established by the Tumbuka people in what is now northern and central Malawi, Tanzania and Zambia, spanning from approximately the 15th century to the 1870s. The kingdom evolved through several phases, beginning with the M'nyanjagha Kingdom (c. 1400s–1770s) and later transitioning to the Chikulamayembe dynasty (c. 1805–1870s) after the arrival of Unyamwezi traders known as the Balowoka.

== Origins of the Tumbuka people ==
The Tumbuka trace their origins to the Luba Kingdom in the Congo Basin region, in what is now the Democratic Republic of the Congo. They left the Luba Kingdom in the early 1400s as part of a larger Bantu migration that included the Hehe and Gogo of modern Tanzania. The migration was led by a senior leader named Mudala, while each ethnic segment had its own junior leader. Mulonga Mbulalubilo led the Tumbuka group and was the first to cross the Lualaba River.

The group moved eastward, passing north of Lake Mweru and through Lake Mweru Wantipa, reaching southern Tanzania. Following Mudala's death around 1410, leadership disputes led to the division of the migrating community into three groups by 1415. The Gogo and Hehe moved north, while the Tumbuka continued southward.

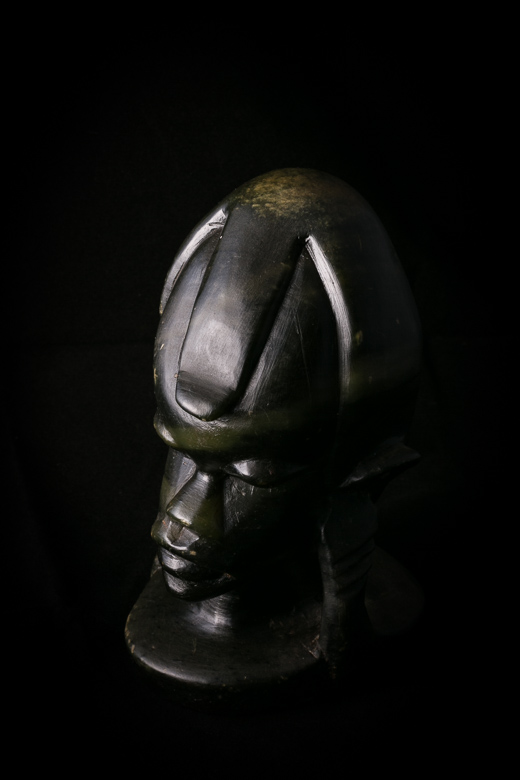
Soapstone carving by Tumbuka people

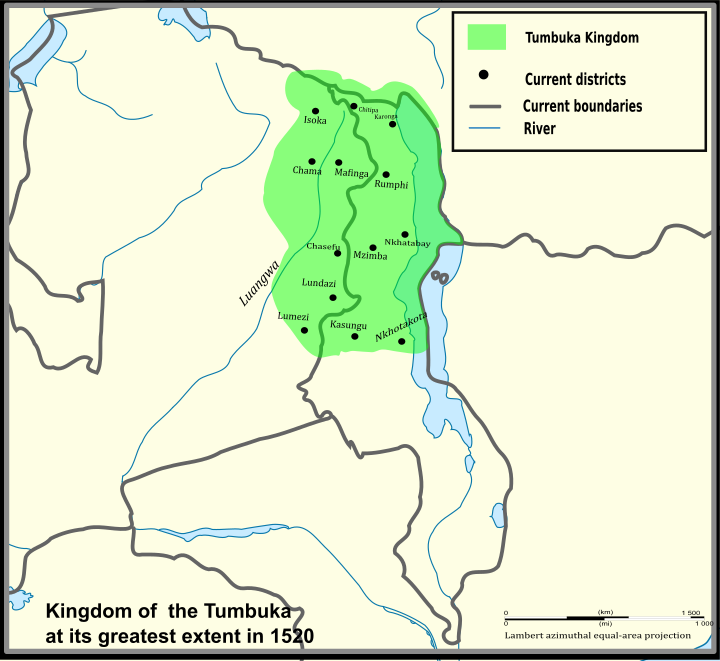
Tumbuka Kingdom at its greatest extent in 1520

During their migration, they discovered a river they called Kalonga ("small river"), later known as the Songwe River. The term "Tumbuka" derives from their experience of crossing rivers and lakes, meaning "we are crossing the water." In the Kalonga District, they referred to themselves as Batumbuka kwa Luba ("the group that broke off from Luba"). By the 15th century, the Tumbuka had settled between the Luangwa River valley and the northern shores of Lake Malawi, becoming the predominant inhabitants of the region.

== M'nyanjagha Kingdom (c. 1400s–1770s) ==
=== Foundation and structure ===
Upon settling in their new homeland, a leader named Kayazga established himself in a fertile valley with many coconut trees. His son Mukamanga ("owner of the coconut trees") became a notable ancestor of the Bakamanga (or Kamanga) clan. The Kamanga settled across what are now western Rumphi, Nkhamanga, parts of Mzimba, and into Lundazi and Chama in Zambia, extending south to the Bua River.

Mukamanga’s descendant Nyanjagha Botawota (Katungambizi I) fathered Longwe Botawota, who became the first M'nyanjagha (king) of the Tumbuka, founding the M'nyanjagha Kingdom.

=== Political organization ===
The M'nyanjagha Kingdom was decentralized. By the 18th century, the Tumbuka lived in scattered homesteads, cultivating millet and herding goats and sheep across the plateau between the Luangwa Valley and Lake Malawi. Villages were organized around clans such as the Luhanga, Kumwenda, and Mkandawire, each maintaining local autonomy.

The Tumbuka were generally peaceful and lacked centralized taxation or formal tribute systems. Instead, loyalty was expressed symbolically, such as by offering leopard or lion skins. Different Tumbuka subgroups occupied specific territories:

- The Henga occupied the Henga Valley north of Rumphi.
- The Phoka lived south of the Nyika Plateau.
- The Kamanga settled in the central Nkhamanga plains.
- The Tonga lived along the lakeshore.

== Arrival of the Balowoka (1770–1805) ==
Between 1770 and 1780, long-distance traders from Unyamwezi in central Tanzania arrived across Lake Malawi. Led by Kakalala Msawira Gondwe (Mlowoka, "the one who crossed over"), they landed at Chilumba and moved inland via Chiweta, Phwezi, and Njakwa into Nkhamanga.

The Tumbuka called these traders Balowoka ("those who crossed over"). They sought ivory and brought cloth, beads, cowrie shells, salt, and iron hoes, which they traded for ivory and other goods.

Mlowoka settled in the Nkhamanga area around 1775, marrying into the Luhanga and Kumwenda clans.

When Mubila Luhanga died, succession passed to Mlowoka’s son, establishing a new political order.

== Chikulamayembe dynasty (c. 1805–1870s) ==
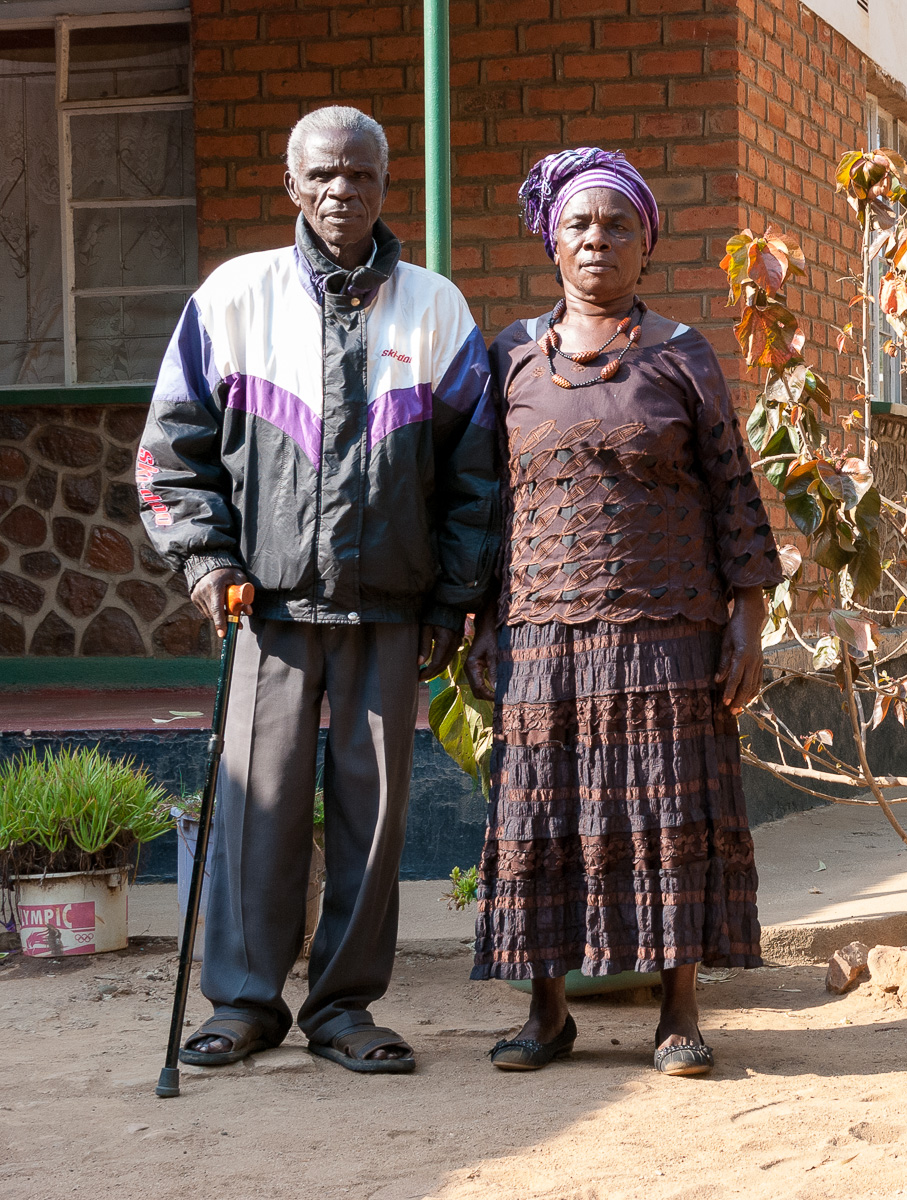
The Paramount Chief of the Tumbuka "Chikulamayembe" (Walter Gondwe)

The Chikulamayembe are a dynasty of kings established among the Tumbuka people in the Nkhamanga and Henga area of Northern Malawi.

=== Foundation under Gonapamuhanya ===
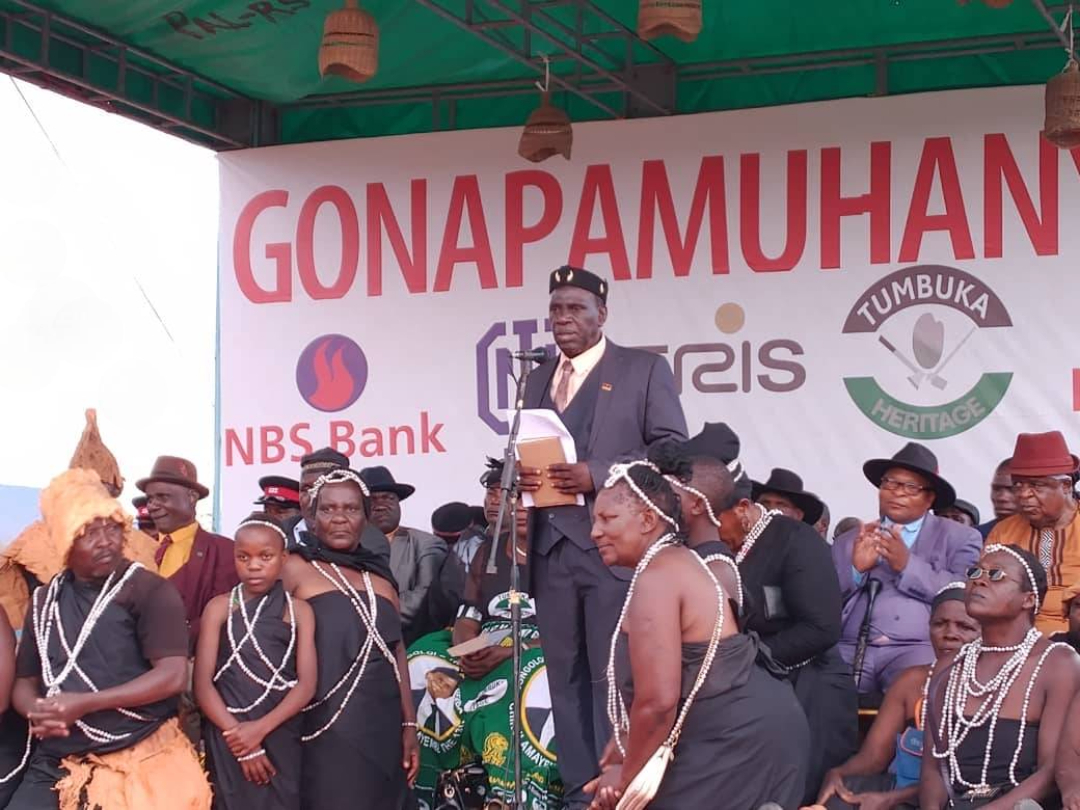
The event of Gonapamuhanya festival of the Tumbuka people in 2025 that took place in Malawi

Around 1805, Mlowoka’s son Gonapamuhanya (Khalapamuhanya) became the first to hold the title Chikulamayembe. The name derives from the Kiswahili phrase chukuwamajembe ("to carry hoes"), referencing the imported hoes he distributed as gifts.

Gonapamuhanya ruled from Bolero in modern Rumphi District, still the seat of the Chikulamayembe chieftaincy. His rule blended Balowoka and Tumbuka traditions, shifting inheritance to patrilineal lines and creating a more centralized trade-based authority.

=== Extent and organization ===
The extent of Chikulamayembe authority extended from the Songwe River in the north to the Dwangwa River in the south, and from the Luangwa valley in the west to Lake Malawi in the east, an area of approximately 20,000 square miles.

=== List of Chikulamayembe rulers (pre-colonial era) ===
The following rulers are documented from the Chikulamayembe dynasty before British colonial intervention:

Ruler	Title	Reign	Notes
Mlowoka	Sekuru	c. 1795–1805	Founder of Balowoka settlement; title means "grandfather"
Gonapamuhanya	Chikulamayembe I	c. 1805–1830s	First to use the Chikulamayembe title; founded the dynasty
Kampungu	Chikulamayembe II	c. 1830s–1840s	Nephew of Gonapamuhanya
Pitamkusa	Chikulamayembe III	c. 1840s–1850s	
Bwati I (Cayeka)	Chikulamayembe IV	c. 1850s	Also known as Cayeka
Bwati II	Chikulamayembe V	c. 1850s	
Bamantha	Chikulamayembe VI	c. 1850s–1855	
Mkuwayira	Chikulamayembe VII	1855	Killed during initial Ngoni raids
Interregnum (Ngoni occupation period)
Mujuma	Chikulamayembe VIII	c. 1880–1907	Killed by Ngoni; last pre-colonial ruler
Interregnum
Cilongozi Mlowoka	Themba Chikulamayembe IX	1907–1931	First colonial-era paramount chief

== Decline (1830s–1870s) ==
=== External pressures ===
By the 1830s, the Chikulamayembe state declined due to a weak central authority, and continued independence of Tumbuka subgroups such as the Phoka.

=== Ngoni invasions ===
From the 1850s, Ngoni warriors led by Zwangendaba’s successor Mmbelwa invaded the region. They killed several rulers, including Mkuwayira and Mujuma, enslaved many Tumbuka, and integrated young men into Ngoni regiments. By the 1870s, the Chikulamayembe state had collapsed.

=== Cultural transformation ===
Ngoni rule brought major cultural shifts such as patrilineal descent became dominant, Ngoni dances and marriage customs spread, but the Tumbuka language persisted and eventually replaced Ngoni speech.

== British colonial period and revival ==
The Northern Ngoni accepted British rule in 1904. Missionaries encouraged restoration of Tumbuka leadership, and the colonial government revived the Chikulamayembe chieftaincy in 1907.

The revival was influenced by a 1909 manuscript by Saulos Nyirenda, later translated by missionary Thomas Cullen Young, which exaggerated the precolonial kingdom’s extent. Based on this version, Mbawuwo Mgonanjerwa Gondwe (Cilongozi Mlowoka), a descendant of Gonapamuhanya, was installed as Themba Chikulamayembe in 1907. He later gained administrative powers under the Native Authority Ordinance of 1933.

== See also ==
- Tumbuka people
- Chikulamayembe dynasty
- Nkhamanga Kingdom
- Tumbuka language
