= Mhango =

Mhango is a surname. It may refer to:

- Banele Mhango (born 2003), South African chess master and coach.
- Bazuka Mhango (born 1939), Malawian lawyer, educator and politician
- Gabadinho Mhango (born 1992), Malawian international footballer
- Geoffrey Du Mhango, Malawian economist, author, and politician
- Margaret Mhango, Zambian politician and government minister
- Mwisho Mhango (born 2007), Malawian footballer
- Winston Mhango (born 1988), Zimbabwean footballer
- Yvonne Mhango, Malawian economist
