= Leroy Vail =

American specialist in African studies

Professor of African History, Harvard University
- In office 1990–1999

Personal details
- Born: Hazen Leroy Vail; August 5, 1940 Boston, Massachusetts
- Died: March 27, 1999 (aged 58) Concord, Massachusetts,
- Cause of death: Lymphoma
- Spouse: Patricia Ann Horochena
- Children: Sharon Mulenga (adopted)
- Parent(s): Hazen Claude Vail, Mary Teresa MacLean
- Education: Boston College, University of Wisconsin – Madison
- Occupation: Historian

Leroy Vail (August 5, 1940 – March 27, 1999) whose birth name was Hazen Leroy Vail, was an American specialist in African studies and educator who specialized in the history and linguistics of Central Africa and later extended his interests to Southern Africa. He taught in universities in Malawi, Zambia and the United States and his research in the first two countries inclined him toward the view that Central Africa underwent a period of underdevelopment that began in the mid-19th century and accelerated under colonial rule. After his return to the United States, he cooperated with Landeg White on studies of colonial Mozambique and on the value of African poetry and songs as a source of oral history.

== Early life, education and family ==
Hazen Leroy Vail, known throughout his adult life as Leroy Vail, was born in Boston, Massachusetts on August 5, 1940, to parents of Canadian origin. His father, Hazen Claude Vail, from Belleisle, New Brunswick, moved to Boston as an adult and his mother, born Mary Teresa MacLean in Cape Breton Island, arrived there as a young girl. He had one younger brother, born in 1943.

Leroy grew up in the Allston neighbourhood of Boston, where he attended local public schools. In 1952, he was admitted to the Boston Latin School, graduating in 1958, and then entered Boston College to study Classics, but he changed to studying history after taking a sophomore course on medieval Europe, and graduated magna cum laude in history in 1962.

Vail attended graduate school at the University of Wisconsin–Madison, intending to study British imperial history under Philip Curtin. However, he quickly moved to the comparative tropical history program led by Curtin and Jan Vansina, where he studied African history and historical linguistics. He was awarded an M.A. in History in 1965, after which he was involved in Bantu language research at Madison, in its newly founded Department of African Languages and Literature.

Leroy married Patricia Ann Horochena, who held a master's degree in mathematics from the University of Wisconsin – Madison in 1967. In 1988, she and Vail took a Zambian girl, Sharon Mulenga, into their home as their daughter. Patricia Vail died on 26 February 2007.

In 1996, Vail suffered a massive heart attack but recovered and returned to work. However, he was later diagnosed with lymphoma which, in the autumn of 1998, spread uncontrollably. He died at his home in Concord on 27 March 1999.

== Academic career ==
=== In Africa ===
Vail was awarded a one-year traveling fellowship by the University of Wisconsin in 1967 and decided to undertake research in Malawi. He became a Lecturer in History in the newly founded University of Malawi and remained there until 1971. After leaving the country, he became a fierce critic of the regime of its first president, Hastings Banda.

In 1967–68 Vail began linguistic research among the Tumbuka people of northern Malawi, publishing his first article, The Noun Classes of Tumbuka in 1971 followed by later ones reinterpreting Tumbuka history and examining the operations of Portuguese companies in the lower Zambezi Valley of Mozambique. He returned to in Madison in 1971 to complete his doctoral thesis Aspects of the Tumbuka Verb, which was accepted in 1972. He was unable to obtain an African history post in North America, so returned to Africa in 1973 as senior lecturer in history and African languages in the University of Zambia, remaining there until 1978. During his time at this university, he organized an undergraduate course in African Languages and a Masters course in African History, and published several important articles on the history of Malawi, Zambia and Mozambique.

=== In the US ===
Vail returned to the United States in 1978, and was visiting Associate Professor successively at Virginia for the 1978–79 academic year, UCLA, for 1979–80 and Ohio for 1980–81. He then gained a Research Fellowship on the Yale Southern African Research Program in 1981-82, returning to Virginia for the 1982–83 academic year. Meanwhile, his first book, Capitalism and Colonialism in Mozambique which he co-authored with Landeg White, was published. Its history was based on archival material and also on African women's songs that recorded the African suffering caused by Portuguese rule in the Lower Zambezi. In 1983, he organized a symposium for historians and anthropologists of southern Africa that investigated the historical nature of African ethnicities in a landmark collection, The Creation of Tribalism in Southern Africa.

Vail became visiting Associate Professor of History at Harvard the spring term 1984, and received his first regular American academic appointment there later that year as Associate Professor of History, being given tenure in 1990, and becoming Chairman of the Committee on African Studies from then until 1995. His second book with Landeg White, Power and the Praise Poem, was published in 1992. This argued that oral history was real history and that poets and their poetry for played a significant role in transmitting Southern African history. In 1994, after the Banda regime had ended, Vail returned to Malawi as a United Nations monitor for the elections of 1994.

== Research interests ==
=== Underdevelopment hypothesis ===
In the 1970s, soon after many former African colonies had become independent, two different approaches were taken to the historical treatment of the period of colonial rule, in Malawi and elsewhere in Africa. One, the Nation-building concept saw the colonial period as an episode in building the post-colonial nation. This view weighed the benefits of the physical infrastructure and economic structures inherited by the new nation against colonial restrictions on African political and social advancement.

Vail questioned the basis of the evolutionary Nation-building scheme of interpretation and was a strong advocate of the concept of Underdevelopment in Central Africa. His attachment to this concept began with his research among what he called the dispossessed and atrociously exploited Tumbuka people. Vail saw underdevelopment as a step-by-step process of impoverishment and stagnation that started in the middle of the 19th century but accelerated under colonial rule. His theme, developed in four significant papers published between 1975 and 1981, was that the in Indian Ocean ivory and slave trades created a demand for imported goods among the people to the west of Lake Malawi in the late 18th and early 19th century and prompted social differentiation within their traditional societies. The mid-19th century incursion of Ngoni peoples into what is now the Northern Region of Malawi and Eastern Province of Zambia caused a further loss of status of among many indigenous groups, whose people become Ngoni serfs or refugees with limited access to land.

=== In Ngoni occupied areas ===
The conversion of migratory Ngoni pastoralism into a mixed agricultural economy placed, in Vail's view, increasing pressure on subject peoples to produce more cereals, which provoked a series of revolts among these subjects in the 1870s. Vail believed that Ngoni practices of shifting or slash-and-burn cultivation and extensive cattle herding and their preference for living in large villages rather than in dispersed farmsteads, as the original inhabitants had done, caused overgrazing and the loss of soil fertility near the villages and the development of uncultivated bush in the areas between villages, into which wild animals carrying Tsetse fly moved and infected nearby cattle. In what became northern Nyasaland, revolts by the oppressed Tumbuka, ecological degradation and the famine it caused undermined the position of the local Ngoni king, Mbelwa.

These events predated any significant European presence in the area, but from the 1870s the African Lakes Company began to import European goods into the area and to transport young African men to work in European enterprises the south. Scottish Presbyterian missionaries also arrived in the area and Mbelwa, who had little power over influential Ngoni military leaders, sought an alliance with the missionaries to strengthen his position against those opponents that saw trying to accommodate the increasing European presence around the shores of Lake Malawi as a betrayal of traditional values. At first, Mbelwa saw Christianity and missionary education as more suitable for Tumbuka serfs than polygamous Ngoni warriors, and their first missions were in Tumbuka or Tonga areas, although he later saw the missionaries’ value for the northern Ngoni state.

Although Mbelwa's Ngoni retained their autonomy until 1904, Vail considers that their social and economic position and those of the Tumbuka were weakened as previous relatively egalitarian class systems became more unequal when they were drawn into the capitalist economy. The Ngoni in North-Eastern Rhodesia lost most of their cattle, representing their wealth, in the rinderpest epidemic of the early 1890s and many of their remaining cattle were seized by British South African Company forces which conquered the Ngoni in that area later in the decade. Restrictions on Africans possessing guns for hunting elephants and other wild animals deprived them, in Vail's view, of sources of income and meat, and the imposition of a hut tax and land expropriation in Northern Rhodesia in the first decade of the 20th century further impoverished this area.

According to Vail, the Ngoni invasions and the advent of colonial rule had created the so-called Dead North in Nyasaland and impoverishment around Chipata in North-Eastern Rhodesia. The colonial policies in these areas and in Mozambique resulted in leaving local African men at best little choice but become labor migrants and at worst in their forced recruitment for the mines, farms and other employers of Southern Rhodesia and South Africa. He considered that the absence of many able-bodied men restricted the ability of those women, youths and older men remaining to produce food or cash crops, and European farmers discouraged the growth of cash crops that might compete with them. As a result of these policies, Vail believed that, for the forty years until 1939, the people the British colonies were impoverished and exploited and that post-World War II policies came too late to make good the damage caused

=== Nyasaland's railways ===
Although Pachai strongly believed that the development of Nyasaland's railways was a positive contribution by the British government to the protectorate's development, Vail considered that the policies of the British government and the local colonial administration turned Nyasaland into an Imperial Slum and a labor reserve for Southern Rhodesia and South Africa. He argued the country's economy was burdened by heavy debts arising from colonial railway construction, which he considered was designed to benefit British companies and interests at the expense of Nyasaland and which hindered its economic development. Initially, the landlocked protectorate was reached from the Indian Ocean along the Zambezi and Shire rivers, which were free of customs dues to international traffic, but falling Shire river levels in the early 20th century created difficulties in maintaining a continuous service. The first railway project was to link the most developed part of the country, the Shire Highlands, to a suitable river port, although this line had to be extended southward as water levels in the Shire continued to fall, and it eventually reached the Zambezi. A railway from Beira in Mozambique to Salisbury in Southern Rhodesia had been opened in 1899 and, after a possible alternative rail route from Quelimane toward the Nyasaland border stalled after the First World War, the British government was under pressure from British-owned companies to link Nyasaland's railways to this line.

Although, as Vail stated, the primary benefit of the Beira route did not accrue to Nyasaland, the protectorate was expected to pay interest and repay capital on loans for the construction of the railway link and the Dona Ana Bridge over the Zambezi out of the expected increase in government revenues. By 1935, the country was liable to repay debts of £5.1 million. Vail also notes that the colonial administration abandoned development plans in the 1930s, attributing this to its indebtedness rather than the Great Depression in general. He suggested that this debt burden left its government with insufficient funds to promote the growing of exportable crops by African farmers. The high freight charges levied by the railways to Beira were a further disincentive to agricultural development and forced protectorate to rely on exporting migrant labor, so producing widespread slum-like conditions and making it little more than a labor reserve.

=== Creation of tribalism ===
In the 1980s, Vail considered the historical background to the creation of ethnicity and the resurgence of tribalism in Central and Southern Africa. His experience in Malawi suggested to him that, in the late 1960s shortly after the independence of several former colonies, there was a revival of the ethnic and regional consciousness that had been established earlier in the 20th century, but which became less prominent during struggles for independence. This revival reflected the artificial origin of most post-colonial African states and their rapid adoption of one-party rule: the development of regionalism and tribalism was a reaction to the dominant party trying to impose a false unity on the existence of ethnic diversity.

Vail did not accept, as other authors had claimed, that ethnicity resulted from the colonial powers’ divide-and-rule tactics, from the rigid classification of African peoples into fixed tribes by European anthropologists or when previously isolated rural groups came together and into conflict in urban or industrial settings. He also questioned whether the growth of ethnic particularism was related to uneven development in colonial times that gave some groups better access to education and employment, or to the creation of myths regarding ancestral political structures that were disrupted in the colonial era.

Although accepting that all these explanations might have some validity, Vail considered them unhistorical and pointed to the impoverishment of Central and Southern Africa in the late 19th and early 20th century through ecological catastrophes such as the rinderpest epidemic, disease, locusts and famine, colonial land expropriation and taxes and labor migrancy, all of which amounted to African people losing control of their lives. He believed that the decline of traditional power systems and the growth of both European organized and African initiated churches gave rise to new identities that, for European missionaries or anthropologists or educated Africans themselves, were ethnic identities, each with its language, often fixed by missionaries for used in education, and a rediscovered or manufactured history and traditions.

In the decade following independence in 1964, political views in Malawi were frequently expressed in ethnic terms, and groups that had prospered under the colonial regime were stigmatized as being unfaithful to the country's Chewa culture which the ruling party and president promoted. Before the ratification of a British protectorate over what became Nyasaland, there were many ethnic groups in the area. Missionaries in the late 19th and early 20th centuries homogenized the various local dialects into a relatively small number of standardized languages, so that the Tumbuka language became the medium of teaching in the north of the country, the Chewa language in the centre and Nyanja and Yao languages in the south. The Chewa and Nyanja languages are closely related and the official standard was called Chinyanja until 1968, when the president of Malawi Hastings Banda, who came from the predominantly Chewa Central Province insisted on it being called Chichewa.

The education provided by Scottish-run missions at several sites in the Northern Province of Nyasaland was superior to that found in most other parts of the protectorate, although other Scottish missionaries at Blantyre Mission also provided educational advancement for some southerners. Those that these missions trained became an educated African elite, who found employment as teachers, in the civil service or in commerce, and whose political aim was African advancement to higher positions in the administration and to obtain a political voice. In contrast, the Yao in the south, including many Muslims debarred from Christian education, and the Chewa in the centre, where fewer missions were founded, were more resentful of the intervention of the colonial state and protective of their traditional culture than motivated by political aspirations.

Many of the leading figures in the Nyasaland African Congress in the late 1950s and early 1960s were Tumbuka speaking northerners or graduates of Blantyre Mission and, in 1963, in preparation for independence, these took a majority of the ministerial posts in Banda's government. Shortly after independence, in the 1964 Cabinet Crisis, the rejection of their demand for more rapid Africanisation, a key aim of the mission-educated elite, led to their resignation or sacking and, in most cases, their exile. In the aftermath of this, Banda purged their supporters from positions of influence and replaced them with Chewa nominees from the Central Region, at the same time promoting the Chewa culture as the only authentic Malawian culture. In addition to renaming the Chinyanja language Chichewa in 1968, Tumbuka was abolished as an official language and the medium of instruction in the Northern Region in the same year, and examination results and the secondary school entrance system were manipulated to assist candidates from the Central Region and disadvantage those from the Northern Region.

=== Later interests ===
Towards the end of his career, Vail widened his interests, including a return to studying Bantu linguistics and at the time of his death, he had four books in progress, three on Central Africa Spirits, Women, and Deprivation, in Malawi and Zambia since 1850, a dictionary of Lakeside Tonga, and Ideophones as stylistic devices in Tumbuka, the fourth was on ethnogenesis in modern Togo. It is possible that his dictionary of Lakeside Tonga may be published in the future.

== Alternative views ==
Vail's research was regarded as innovative when published, but his views in three areas have been reassessed by other scholars or modified by later research: the extent of ecological damage caused by African agricultural practices, the degree of compulsion involved in labor migration and its overall effects, and the cost to Nyasaland of its colonial era railways. Two more recent assessments are that British rule was a mixed blessing for many of the peoples of Northern Rhodesia and Nyasaland, as it brought an end to warfare and slave raiding, yet redirected much of their productive labor toward the capitalism of the south, and that many labor migrants travelled south clandestinely, ignoring governmental restrictions, in search of financial security; although many were exploited, others achieved modest prosperity after their return from their savings out of higher wages earned abroad.

=== Environmental degradation ===
Much of Vail's account of environmental degradation in Northern Nyasaland is based on the views of 19th century missionaries who regarded Ngoni farming practices as environmentally destructive, wasteful and therefore morally wrong, and also the attitudes of colonial officials from the 1930s onward who accepted the missionaries' views without any supporting empirical evidence. Read regarded the Ngoni as having an efficient agricultural system based on the labor of their serfs, and accounts from the 1870s to 1890s mention extensive cultivation and cattle herding, and the apparent health and prosperity of the Ngoni people.

The main objection of missionaries and colonial officials was to the Ngoni shifting or slash-and-burn cultivation, which a few tropical agriculturalists from the 1950s began to recognize them as sympathetic to the environment, and which many modern-day tropical agriculturalists consider may be more efficient than fixed cultivation of many tropical soils. Vail expressly rejected Read's views, claiming she had been misadvised by Ngoni informants, but he did not consider the efficiency or otherwise of slash-and-burn cultivation. Recent research supports Read's views, showing that, in 1998, most soils in Malawi were adequate for growing maize, as fertility had declined much less rapidly than forecast between the 1930s and 1950s.

=== Labor migration ===
Vail's suggestions that the forced recruitment of labor and the forced consumption of foreign goods were imposed on the Tumbuka and Ngoni in northern Nyasaland in the later 19th century, or that other African men in Nyasaland, eastern Northern Rhodesia or Mozambique had little or no option but to become labor migrants seem overstated. The first labor migrancy from the area between the north-western shores of Lake Nyasa and the Luangwa valley predated these areas becoming British dependencies, and was initially directed to the Shire Highlands. However, in the mid to late 1890s, some workers travelled voluntarily to Southern Rhodesia and South Africa where wages were much higher.

Rather than consistently promoting labor migration, the Nyasaland government opposed all migration of workers outside the protectorate before 1903 and from 1913 to 1936 and, when it did allow migrancy, the government insisted on enforcing controls on the numbers recruited by licensed labor organizations and a system of deferring part of the men's pay until they returned to Nyasaland. However, many workers left independently, disregarding government restrictions and licensed recruiters For much of the first half of the 20th century, there was a debate on whether Nyasaland should have as its main economic function agriculture on European owned estates, peasant cash-crop production or the supply of migrant labor. Although labor migration was predominant in the Northern Province of Nyasaland and Eastern Province of Northern Rhodesia, regarding them simply as labor reserves ignores the increasing importance of peasant cash crop production in these areas and government attempts to find suitable cash crops which could replace migrant laboring as the main source of local cash incomes. Peasant cash-crop production in Nyasaland's Central Province and this together with agriculture on European-owned estates in the Southern Province were far more important than labor migration to their local economies and that of Nyasaland as a whole in the colonial period.

Vail and White considered that the colonial administration of Mozambique pressured local Africans into migrant labor by discouraging them from growing cash crops and requiring them to engage in productive labor. However, Penvenne argued that Vail and White did not clearly distinguish between coercive labor conscription for work within Mozambique and migrant labor recruitment, where workers actively sought higher wages outside its territory. This external migrant labor was voluntary and often the subject of disapproval by officials or companies based in Mozambique.

=== Railway finance ===
Vail's argument that the cost of railway links impoverished Nyasaland, preventing the government from promoting efficient peasant agriculture has also been questioned. The Nyasaland government only had to pay interest and repay capital on the loans for constructing the Trans-Zambezia Railway or Zambezi Bridge if its revenues exceeded target figures. During the period 1930 to 1947, it only paid interest in 1936 and repaid no capital, and all the accrued debt liabilities passed to the Federation of Rhodesia and Nyasaland in 1953. Rather than draining Nyasaland's admittedly meagre public funds, as Vail suggests, the railway and Zambezi Bridge cost it relatively little and provided a more effective, if underutilized, link to the outside world than the previously used option of river transport.

Although Vail mentions that various development projects were shelved in 1935, he does not provide a direct link between this and the increased public debt. A more detailed review of the Nyasaland government's actual revenue and expenditure in the 1929 to 1939 Great Depression showed that revenue was maintained in the first part of that decade and rose in the second half, and that ordinary government expenditure rose by 50% in the period, with significant increases in Social Services and Natural Resources spending and staff, although the amounts were small.

== Sources ==
- E Akyeampong, K A Appiah, J C Miller and J Womack, Jr. (2000). Memorial Minute – H. Leroy Vail The Harvard Gazette 15 June 2000.
- C Baker, (1974). Depression and Development in Nyasaland 1929 — 1939. The Society of Malawi Journal, Vol. 27, No. 1.
- Boston Globe, (2007). Obituary of Patricia Ann (Horochena) Vail.
- W Beinart, (1984). Soil Erosion, Conservationism and Ideas about Development: A Southern African Exploration, 1900–1960. Journal of Southern African Studies, Vol. 11, No. 1.
- G C Bond, (2000). Historical Fragments and Social Constructions in Northern Zambia. Journal of African Cultural Studies, Vol. 13, No. 1, p. 81.
- A G Irvine, (1959). The Balance of Payments of Rhodesia and Nyasaland, 1945–1954. Oxford University Press.
- J McCracken, (2002). The Ambiguities of Nationalism: Flax Musopole and the Northern Factor in Malawian Politics, c. 1956-1966, Journal of Southern African Studies Vol.28, No.1.
- J McCracken, (2003). Conservation and Resistance in Colonial Malawi: the 'Dead North' Revisited, in W Beinart and J McGregor (editors). Social History and African Environments, Oxford, James Currey. ISBN 0-85255-951-8.
- J McCracken, (2012). A History of Malawi, 1859–1966. Woodbridge, James Currey. ISBN 978-1-84701-050-6.
- J C. Miller, (1999). In Memoriam H. Leroy Vail (1940–99) Perspectives on History, November 1999.
- H Mitchell, (2013). In Search of Green Pastures: Labour Migration from Colonial Malawi, 1939–1960. The Society of Malawi Journal, Vol. 66, No. 2.
- H L Moore and M Vaughan, (1994). Cutting Down Trees: Gender, Nutrition, and Agricultural Change in the Northern Province of Zambia, 1890–1990. London: James Currey, 1994. ISBN 978-0-43508-088-4.
- D K Mphande, (2014). Oral Literature and Moral Education among the Lakeside Tonga of Northern Malawi, Mzuzu, Mzuni Press. ISBN 978-9-99080-244-3.
- B Pachai, (1973). Malawi: The History of the Nation. London, Longman. ISBN 0-58264-554-9.
- M Read, (1956). The Ngoni of Nyasaland. Oxford University Press for the International African Institute.
- S S Snapp, (1998). Soil Nutrient Status of Smallholder Farms in Malawi. Communications in Soil Science and Plant Analysis Vol. 29.
- T J Thompson (1995). Christianity in Northern Malawi: Donald Fraser's Missionary Methods and Ngoni Culture. Leiden, Brill. ISBN 978-9-00410-208-8.
- L Vail, (1975). The Making of an Imperial Slum: Nyasaland and Its Railways, 1895–1935. The Journal of African History, Vol. 16, No. 1.
- L Vail (1977). Ecology and History: The example of Eastern Zambia. Journal of Southern African Studies, Vol. III, No.2.
- L Vail, (1981). The Making of the "Dead North": A Study of the Ngoni Rule in Northern Malawi, c. 1855-1907', in J.B. Peires (ed.), Before and After Shaka: Papers in Nguni History. Grahamstown, Institute of Social and Economic Research, Rhodes University.
- L Vail, (1989). Introduction: Ethnicity in Southern African History, in L Vail (editor), the Creation of Tribalism in Southern Africa. Oxford, James Currey. ISBN 978-0-85255-043-4.
- L Vail and L White, (1989). Tribalism in the Political History of Malawi, in L Vail (editor), the Creation of Tribalism in Southern Africa. Oxford, James Currey. ISBN 978-0-85255-043-4.
- L Vail, L White and J Penvenne, (1979). The Struggle for Mozambique: Capitalist Rivalries, 1900–40 (with Comments and Discussion) Review of the Fernand Braudel Center, Vol. 3, No. 2.
