= Kamanga people =

Ethnic tribe of Malawi and Zambia

Kamanga
ŴaKamanga

Total population
- 3.5 million people (2024)

Regions with significant populations
- Malawi (mainly Rumphi District and Mzimba District), Karonga District, Zambia

Languages
- Chitumbuka

Religion
- Christianity, African traditional religion

Related ethnic groups
- Tumbuka people, Henga people, Phoka people, Hewe people

The Kamanga people are a Bantu ethnic group of the larger Tumbuka group of Malawi, Zambia, Tanzania and Zimbabwe. They are the largest group of a larger Tumbuka people group united under one ruler of the Nkhamanga Kingdom. The Kamanga people speak Chitumbuka (Tumbuka) as their first language, the Bantu language of East, South and Central Africa. Their current population (2024 estimate) is approximately 6,500,600 people in all the four countries. The Kamanga people in Northern and Central Malawi are scattered across all the districts of the regions, but are predominantly found in Rumphi, Mzimba, Kasungu and Karonga.

== History and origin ==
The Kamanga back in 1400, when they left Democratic Republic of the Congo and entered Malawi, Nyasaland under the leadership of Mwambulalubilo. Like most Tumbuka groups, they crossed the rivers and lakes in search of fertile land for farming.
