= M'nyanjagha Kingdom =

Pre-colonial Tumbuka kingdom in Africa

Kingdom of M'nyanjagha M'nyanjagha Kingdom
- c. 1460–c. 1770s
- Status: Kingdom
- Capital: South Lukulu River region (various seats)
- Common languages: Tumbuka language
- Ethnic groups: Tumbuka people
- Religion: Traditional Tumbuka religion
- Government: Monarchy
- M'nyanjagha (King)
- Historical era: Pre-colonial Africa
  - Coronation of Longwe I: c. 1460
  - Transition to Chikulamayembe Kingdom: c. 1770s
Preceded by	Succeeded by
Tumbuka chiefdoms	Chikulamayembe dynasty

The M'nyanjagha Kingdom (also known as the early Tumbuka Kingdom) was a pre-colonial centralized state established by the Tumbuka people in the present-day northern Malawi, eastern Zambia and southern Tanzania. The kingdom emerged around the mid-fifteenth century under the leadership of Longwe I, who became the first ruler to unify previously independent Tumbuka chiefdoms under a single monarchy.

The term M'nyanjagha referred to the supreme ruler of the kingdom, while Nyanjagha referred to subordinate chiefs under his authority. Over time, the system developed into a structured political hierarchy with a central monarchy supported by regional chiefs, advisers and local headmen.

== History ==
=== Origins ===
The origins of the kingdom are traced to Mukamanga, an ancestral figure in Tumbuka traditions. One of his sons, Nyanjagha Botawota Katungambizi I (commonly known as Bota), was the first known bearer of the title Nyanjagha. The name originated from his habit of hiding among nyanjagha trees in his local environment.

Bota had several children, including Longwe I, who later emerged as the most significant figure in early Tumbuka political history. Although multiple independent chiefdoms already existed among the Tumbuka, Longwe eventually rose above them through his leadership abilities.

=== Formation of the kingdom ===
Longwe I was voluntarily chosen as overall leader by other Nyanjaghas due to his effective governance of his own chiefdom. This marked the beginning of a centralized political system among the Tumbuka.

Around 1460, Longwe was formally recognised as M'nyanjagha, meaning "owner of the other Nyanjaghas", signifying his authority over subordinate chiefs. (Note: In later usage, Nyanjagha came to mean "chief", while M'nyanjagha referred to the king or supreme ruler of the Tumbuka political system.)

Before this period, Tumbuka chiefdoms were politically independent but maintained social relations and occasional cooperation during times of need.

== Dynasty ==
The M'nyanjagha dynasty was the ruling lineage of the M'nyanjagha Kingdom, a pre-colonial Tumbuka state that emerged in the mid-15th century. The dynasty began with Longwe I, who is regarded in Tumbuka oral traditions as the first ruler to unify independent Tumbuka chiefdoms under a central authority. Succession within the dynasty generally followed matrilineal principles, although in the early formation period sons and brothers were occasionally used in the absence of eligible nephews or grandsons.

The early dynasty established the foundations of centralized governance among the Tumbuka, with later rulers such as Kazanduka associated with territorial expansion and stronger administrative control over subordinate chiefs.

Regnal titles
Preceded by Tumbuka chiefdoms	M'nyanjagha of the Tumbuka Kingdom c. 1460 – c. 1490	Succeeded by Kazanduka
Preceded by Longwe I	M'nyanjagha of the Tumbuka Kingdom c. 1490 – ?	Succeeded by Later succession (uncertain)

The dynasty is also known for its early development of structured governance systems, including councils of advisers, administrative committees and communication networks that linked dispersed chiefdoms across the kingdom. These institutions contributed to the consolidation of authority under the M'nyanjagha and maintained cohesion among semi-autonomous regional leaders.

=== Migration and settlement ===
Longwe and his followers migrated through several regions, eventually settling near the Njakwa Mountains in present-day Malawi. There they encountered established Tumbuka clans including Mwanjakwa (Mfune), Jalavikuba, Mwankhunikila and Munthali.

The Munthali clan is traditionally linked to intermarriage between Tumbuka and Ndali groups from southern Tanzania.

Later, Longwe established a settlement near Lake Kazuni, an area used for fishing and trade in dried fish. However, the area was reportedly dangerous due to crocodile attacks, leading to population movements away from the region.

Longwe, together with key family members including Kazanduka and Mbuluko, eventually crossed the South Lukulu River and established a royal seat on its eastern bank. This location became the political centre of the emerging kingdom.

== Expansion under Longwe I and Kazanduka (1460–c. 1520) ==
During the reign of Longwe I, the first M'nyanjagha (c. 1460–1490), the Tumbuka Kingdom developed from a collection of independent chiefdoms into a more centralized political unit. These chiefdoms voluntarily joined the emerging state in recognition of Longwe's leadership qualities, forming what has been described as a voluntaristic state-building system.

The kingdom under Longwe I was relatively small but politically cohesive. Its structure combined autonomous local chiefdoms under a central authority, with subordinate Nyanjaghas administering regional territories while acknowledging the supremacy of the M'nyanjagha.

=== Territorial extent under Longwe I ===
By the end of Longwe I's reign, the kingdom had expanded into a medium-sized political unit. Its territory extended from the Kasitu River in present-day northern Malawi to the Luangwa River in the west and eastwards along river systems including the Luwumbu and Manthepa Rivers.

The southern and western boundaries were defined by a series of natural landmarks including hills, streams and tributaries of the Luangwa system. The kingdom incorporated areas such as Zungwa Hill, Kalinku River and regions near present-day Chondoka Village (Malawi).

=== Expansion under Kazanduka ===
Following Longwe I's death around 1490, his son Kazanduka became the second M'nyanjagha. His reign marked a territorial expansion of the kingdom, transforming it into a larger and more consolidated political entity.

Kazanduka's expansion was achieved primarily through occupation of sparsely populated areas rather than large-scale military conquest. According to oral traditions, these areas had previously been inhabited by Saan-speaking communities, locally referred to as Bakafula or Mwaniwonelanku, who gradually retreated south-westward.

By approximately 1520, the kingdom under Kazanduka extended from present-day Mzuzu in northern Malawi to the Bua River in the south and from the Songwe River in the north to the Luangwa River in the west. The total area is estimated at over 51,000 square kilometres.

=== Later succession tradition ===
After Kazanduka, succession continued within the M'nyanjagha dynasty, although the precise order of rulers varies across oral traditions. The lineage is generally understood to include a mixture of sons, nephews and brothers, reflecting the flexible application of matrilineal inheritance during the early formation period of the state.

Some of the later rulers include Gonthaminga, Chimunyila, Katumbikika, Mitawata, Musiwila, Gwamba, Thambalika and others, although chronological sequencing remains uncertain in surviving accounts.

== List of rulers ==
The following is a list of rulers of the M'nyanjagha Kingdom. The chronology and succession order for early and later rulers is partially uncertain, particularly after the reign of Kazanduka.

No.	Name	Reign	Notes
1	Mulonga Mbulalubilo Muluba	c. 1400–c. 1430	Regarded as the founding ruler of the early Tumbuka political tradition.
2	Kalonga wa Songwe	c. 1430–?	Son of Mulonga Mbulalubilo Muluba; early pre-kingdom leader.
3	Kayazga Ntambwe	?	Associated with early consolidation of clan-based leadership.
4	Mukamanga	?	Linked to the Mukamanga lineage from which later leadership emerged.
5	Nyanjagha Botawota (Katungambizi I)	?	First recorded holder of the title "Nyanjagha"; origin of the name from nyanjagha trees.
6	Longwe I	c. 1460–c. 1490	First M'nyanjagha; unified independent chiefdoms into a centralized kingdom.
7	Kazanduka	c. 1490–?	Second M'nyanjagha; expanded the kingdom significantly.
8	Gonthaminga	?	Later ruler; exact chronology uncertain.
9	Chimunyila	?	Son of Maheni; associated with regional governance.
10	Katumbikika	?	Traditional ruler; succession details unclear.
11	Mitawata	?	Son of Jenala from Jalila lineage.
12	Musiwila	?	Associated with Jalila lineage; nephew in some traditions.
13	Gwamba	?	Stepbrother lineage from Jalila tradition.
14	Thambalika	?	Stepbrother lineage from Chiti tradition.
15	Wombwe (Chihomaniche)	?	Son of Wombwe lineage; administrative ruler.
16	Chitukula	?	Associated with Chiyunga lineage.
17	Chibanjala I	?	Later ruler in the dynasty sequence.
18	Sakalale	?	Son of Nyanje from Chamanyavyose lineage.
19	Chanangika	?	Son of Genesi; nephew in succession tradition.
20	Kaluka Nthala Luwewe	?	Son of Samanayo; nephew in lineage accounts.
21	Longwe II	?	Later ruler continuing the Longwe lineage.

== Government and administration ==
The M'nyanjagha was the supreme political, judicial and religious authority of the kingdom. He enforced laws, led religious ceremonies and provided leadership during crises. Governance was supported by royal relatives, especially maternal uncles, reflecting the matrilineal nature of Tumbuka society.

The kingdom was structured into several administrative levels; M'nyanjagha (king), Nyanjagha (subordinate chiefs), Vilolo (sub-chiefs under Nyanjagha), Kapole (senior group headman and royal messenger) and village headmen.

At each level, rulers were advised by councillors known as yinthini, who assisted in political, social, economic and cultural governance.

=== Committees of governance ===
Three main committees supported the administration of the kingdom the special committee managed state affairs during the absence or death of a ruler. It included the kazembe, Kapemba, Chiti, Kapole and senior royal relatives. The administrative committee supervised governance, approved decisions of the special committee and oversaw royal succession and burial arrangements. The committee of councillors managed land, housing, health, agriculture, education and communication systems.

=== Communication systems ===
The kingdom developed structured communication networks using drums, smoke signals and a symbolic method known as mata pa jani. These systems enabled rapid transmission of messages across the kingdom.

== Succession and selection of rulers ==
Succession to the throne followed matrilineal principles. The preferred heir was typically the nephew or grandson of the reigning M'nyanjagha. In the absence of suitable heirs, brothers could be installed as rulers, particularly during the early formation period of the kingdom. (Note: This reflects a transitional system of inheritance in which both matrilineal and, occasionally, patrilineal practices were used depending on availability of heirs and historical circumstances.) Before installation, a verification body composed of royal relatives, advisers and subordinate chiefs confirmed the legitimacy of the successor. Although described as an "electoral college" in modern terms, it functioned as a consensus-based verification group rather than an electoral system.

The process was chaired by the kazembe and final confirmation required consultation among senior subkings including Kapemba and Chiti, before public announcement across the kingdom.

== See also ==
- Tumbuka people
- Chikulamayembe Kingdom
- History of Malawi

== Books ==
- Chondoka, Yizenge. A History of the Tumbuka from 1400 to 1900.
