= Mulonga Mbulalubilo =

Founder of the Tumbuka people

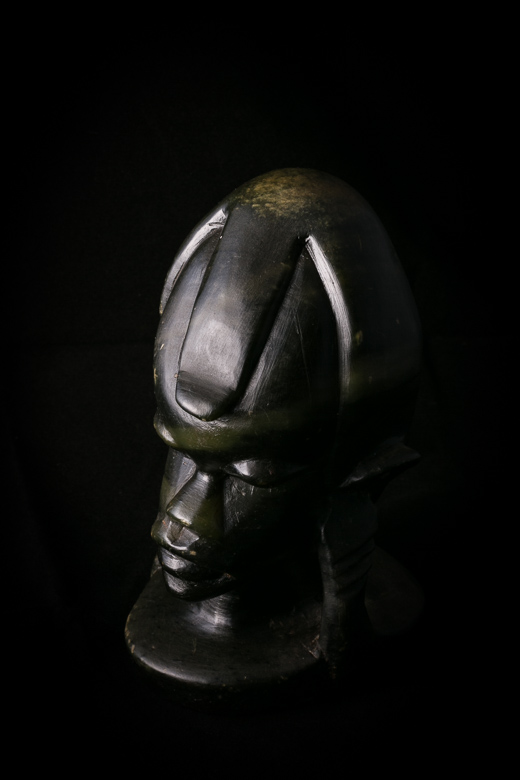
- A carving depicting the younger Mulonga Mbulalubilo
- Born: circa 14th-15th century Luba region (present-day Democratic Republic of the Congo)
- Died: 1430 present-day northern Malawi / eastern Zambia (traditionally)
- Years active: 1400-1600
- Known for: Ancestral leader of the Tumbuka migration; founding figure in Tumbuka history
- Title: Mutemi (chieftain / headman)

Mulonga Mbulalubilo (died c. 1430) was the founder and first king of the Tumbuka people, known for leading the group out of the Luba-Congo region toward what is today central and northern Malawi, eastern Zambia and Tanzania He is regarded as the founder of the leadership lineage that eventually led to formation of the Nkhamanga Kingdom and the Chikulamayembe dynasty.

== Early life and migration ==
Mbulalubilo was born in Luba. Before 1400 AD, a mixed group left the Luba Kingdom under a senior leader named Mudala. The Tumbuka segment was led by Mulonga Mbulalubilo. Around 1410, Mudala died in the area south of modern Tanzania bordering Zambia, and the group split shortly thereafter. By approximately 1415, Mulonga’s Tumbuka group reached Kalonga, where they settled temporarily. The migration under Mulonga is said to have been in settlement of highland areas where later the Nkhamanga Kingdom would emerge. These settlements served as a base for further clan formation and subdivision among Tumbuka peoples.

=== Death ===
Mulonga Mbulalubilo died at Kalonga around 1430. Following his death, the Tumbuka at Kalonga dispersed, and by 1450, they had settled in many parts west and south of Kalonga, establishing early chiefdoms. In 1460, Longwe became the first widely recognised M’nyanjagha (king) of the emerging Tumbuka polity, who later died of old age in 1490. By 1500, the Chewa passed through Kalonga, and by 1520, the Tumbuka Kingdom was at its greatest extent under M’nyanjagha Kazanduka.

==== Mulonga Mbulalubilo as Junior Mutemi and the Crossing of the Lualaba River ====
Mulonga Mbulalubilo, whose praise name Mbulalubilo means “without speed” or “moving slowly,” was a junior mutemi within the migrating Tumbuka segment. As a junior mutemi, he led the Tumbuka group while the senior mutemi, Mudala, remained overall leader of the larger migration. Mulonga earned his name from his careful and deliberate nature; he acted with maturity and deliberation rather than on impulse.

Mulonga was the first to cross the Lualaba River and after him, the senior mutemi Mudala and other batemi crossed the river, following his example. The analogy between Mulonga and the slow-moving Lualaba River illustrates his deliberate leadership style. This arrangement of leadership continued up to southern Tanzania, where Mudala died around 1410.

== Tumbuka Kingdom ==
The Tumbuka Kingdom faced successive pressures from neighboring groups. The Balowoka entered the Nkhamanga–Rumphi area in 1770, followed by the Bisa in 1780. By 1850, the Bemba under Chitimukulu Chepele invaded the northern part of the Tumbuka Kingdom, and in 1855, the Ngoni M’mbelwa from Mapupo (Nachipeta in Isoka District) settled in the northern region. The British government formally colonised the disintegrated Tumbuka Kingdom around 1890.

=== Leadership and legacy ===
Mulonga is described as a mutemi (a term for headman or chief) who was both warrior and organizer, making consensus among clans, leading group migrations, negotiating with neighbouring groups, and selecting sites for settlement with access to resources such as water, arable land, and trade routes.

A book A History of the Tumbuka from 1400 to 1900 cites Mulonga Mbulalubilo as the ancestral leader whose lineage includes chiefs later known under the Chikulamayembe dynasty. Under those later rulers, the Nkhamanga Kingdom became more formally organized as a political entity in what is now northern Malawi, with its capital in the Rumphi-Mzimba region.

== See also ==
- Tumbuka people
- Nkhamanga Kingdom
- Chikulamayembe dynasty
