= Sukwa people =

Ethnic group

The Sukwa people are an ethnic group in Malawi. According to the 2018 census, they make up 0.5% of Malawi's population. The Sukwa mainly live in Northern Malawi in the districts of Chitipa and Karonga.

== Mwinoghe traditional dance ==
The Sukwa have a traditional dance called Mwinoghe. This is an instrumental dance performed in three ethnic communities in northern Malawi. In the Chisukwa dialect, Mwinoghe means "Let us enjoy ourselves".

The dance expresses joy and happiness. Dancers line up in two rows (men on one side, women on the other), and perform twisting body and elaborate foot movements to the sound of three drums, a whistle and the group leader's commands. People from all walks of life gather to watch the dance, which is performed at social gatherings and on days of national significance.
