= Munthali (surname) =

Munthali is an East African surname.

Notable people with this surname include:

- Brighton Munthali (born 1997), Malawian professional footballer
- Christopher Munthali, Zambian professional footballer
- Francis Munthali, Malawian former middle-distance runner
- Mwiza Munthali, Malawian-born activist and specialist in Africa and African Diaspora affairs
- Rumba Munthali (born 1978), Zambian-Canadian former professional soccer player
- Tiwonge Munthali (born 1998), Malawian model, Miss Malawi in 2018
