= Nyirenda =

Nyirenda is a surname. Notable people with the surname include:

- Charlton Nyirenda (born 1988), Malawian swimmer
- Harry Nyirenda (born 1990), Malawian footballer
- Thomas Nyirenda (born 1986), Zambian football player
- Victor Nyirenda (born 1988), Malawian footballer
- Zindaba Nyirenda, Zambian princess and author
