= Bazuka Mhango =

Malawian politician

Bazuka Michael Kalwefu Mhango (born 19 March 1939) is a Malawian lawyer, educator and politician. He was born in Kasole Village in Karonga District, Northern Region, Malawi. He worked as a Science and Mathematics teacher at Livingstonia Secondary School in Rumphi before he became a lawyer and active in politics and public administration. He is the founder and President of Kaporo Foundation for Rural Development. He is the founder Commissioner for the University of Livingstonia and the commissioner charged with establishing Mzuzu University. His memberships include being on the board of the Malawi Broadcasting Corporation and the One Village One Product Programme. He is a member of the British Institute of Management (MBIM), He is currently a Member of Parliament for Karonga North West and was the former Minister of Justice & Constitutional Affairs and former Minister of Lands, Housing and Surveys.

== Early career ==
Before holding public posts, he went to Nyakasura Secondary School in Uganda in 1959. He was a recipient of the Queens Scout Award while he was a member of the Boys Scout Movement of Great Britain from 1957–1960. He was made Boys Scout Commissioner in Nyasaland Northern Province. In his early career he worked as a teacher in Malawi. He earned his Bachelor of Laws Degree and a Diploma in Education from the University of Malawi and holds a postgraduate Diploma in Business Studies from Alexander Hamilton Institute in 1972. He worked at A.R. Osman and Company for a year before he left to start his own law firm. He is the founder and CEO of the law firm Bazuka and Company from 1973–2004. His law firm was involved in several high-profile cases in Malawi. He also worked as legal advisor to the Malawi Development Corporation (MDC).

== Late career and public posts ==
- Legal advisor to Alliance for Democracy (Malawi) until relationships with the political party dissolved.
- Minister of Lands, Housing & Surveys - 2004 2006
- Minister of Justice & Constitutional Affairs 2006-2007

== Personal life ==
He is married to three wives and has 14 children. His stepson was Malawian playwright Du Chisiza. He is brother to Malawian economist and author, Dr. Geoffrey L Du Mhango.
