= Tonga people (Malawi) =

Ethnic group in northern Malawi

The Tonga (also called Nyasa Tonga) are an ethnic group who are part of the larger Tumbuka people group living in northern Malawi in Nkhata Bay District. The Nyasa Tongas speak a dialect of Chitumbuka called Chitonga.

Their language dialect and Tonga people of Zambia and Zimbabwe belong to different branches of the Bantu family and are not related.

== History ==
The Tonga people are remnants of the Tumbuka people. When the Ngoni from South Africa who had fled from the Zulu warriors raided the western Nkhamanga Kingdom, the kingdom split into two with one group being currently called Tonga and the other Tumbuka. In reality, the two groups are part of one family and Glottolog categorizes Tonga language and Tumbuka language in a single language family.

== Language ==
According to the 2018 census, there were nearly 170,000 speakers of the Malawi Tonga language which is a dialect of the Tumbuka language. During colonial times, Tongas learned Chitumbuka in school as it was one of the official languages of Malawi.
