= Mkandawire =

Mkandawire is a surname of African origin. Notable people with the surname include:

- Daniel Mkandawire (born 1951), Malawian high jumper and triple jumper
- Donton Samuel Mkandawire (died 2011), Malawian politician, educator and diplomat
- Gertrude Nya Mkandawire politician in Malawi
- Judge Mkandawire (born 1986), Zambian football player
- Levy Mkandawire (1961–2021), Zambian politician
- Noel Mkandawire (1978–2017), Malawian football player
- Rosemary Mkandawire CEO of Toyota Malawi
- Tamika Mkandawire (born 1983), Malawian-born English football player
- Theresa Mkandawire, Malawian prof of Civil Engineering
- Thandika Mkandawire (1940–2020), Malawian economist
- Wambali Mkandawire (1952–2021), Malawian jazz singer and activist
- Yafet Mkandawire, Malawian Presbyterian

== See also ==
- Mandawara
