= Chitipa =

- Location in Malawi
- Coordinates: 9°42′07″S 33°16′12″E
- Country: Malawi
- Region: Northern Region
- District: Chitipa District

Population (2018 Census)
  - Total: 17,743
- Time zone: +2
- Climate: Aw

Chitipa is the capital of Chitipa District, Malawi. It is also known as Fort Hill. It is very near Malawi's tri-point border with Zambia and Tanzania. The town is known for the number of languages spoken there.

It has 5 major regions headed by a traditional authority(TA), these regions are: Kameme, Wenya,z Nthalire, Misuku and finally Bulambia The headquarters of the district is in Bulambia.

== Notable people ==
Former parliament speaker Mnyenyembe This was the birthplace of Malawian lawyer, politician, and philanthropist James Nyondo.

The town's communications were much improved in 2013 when a tarmacked road was installed.

The year before his death Nyondo stood in the local elections offering to transform Chitipa into a city.

Another notable figure from this district is writer Legson Kayira.

== Climate ==
Climate data for Chitipa (1961–1990)
Month	Jan	Feb	Mar	Apr	May	Jun	Jul	Aug	Sep	Oct	Nov	Dec	Year
Mean daily maximum °C (°F)	26.2 (79.2)	26.4 (79.5)	26.1 (79.0)	25.6 (78.1)	24.8 (76.6)	23.7 (74.7)	23.5 (74.3)	24.9 (76.8)	27.7 (81.9)	29.9 (85.8)	29.6 (85.3)	27.0 (80.6)	26.3 (79.3)
Daily mean °C (°F)	20.4 (68.7)	20.4 (68.7)	20.5 (68.9)	19.9 (67.8)	18.7 (65.7)	17.2 (63.0)	16.8 (62.2)	18.2 (64.8)	20.8 (69.4)	22.9 (73.2)	22.8 (73.0)	20.9 (69.6)	20.0 (68.0)
Mean daily minimum °C (°F)	17.1 (62.8)	17.1 (62.8)	17.2 (63.0)	16.9 (62.4)	15.1 (59.2)	12.9 (55.2)	12.5 (54.5)	13.7 (56.7)	15.9 (60.6)	17.7 (63.9)	18.3 (64.9)	17.6 (63.7)	16.0 (60.8)
Average precipitation mm (inches)	204.8 (8.06)	216.0 (8.50)	192.0 (7.56)	56.6 (2.23)	7.5 (0.30)	0.6 (0.02)	0.8 (0.03)	0.0 (0.0)	0.7 (0.03)	6.0 (0.24)	78.8 (3.10)	224.0 (8.82)	987.8 (38.89)
Average precipitation days (≥ 0.3 mm)	21	19	19	10	3	2	2	1	1	2	7	20	107
Average relative humidity (%)	83	84	84	82	77	73	70	63	55	57	61	79	72
Mean monthly sunshine hours	142.6	137.2	173.6	213.0	260.4	282.0	300.7	310.0	297.0	291.4	234.0	167.4	2,809.3
Mean daily sunshine hours	4.6	4.9	5.6	7.1	8.4	9.4	9.7	10.0	9.9	9.4	7.8	5.4	7.7
Source: NOAA

== Demographics ==
Year	Population
1987	4,925
1998	7,636
2008	14,753
2018	17,743
