= Chihana =

Chihana is both a given name and a surname. Notable people with the name include:

== Given name ==
- Chihana Hara (born 1989), Japanese group rhythmic gymnast

== Surname ==
- Chakufwa Chihana (1939–2006), Malawian human rights activist
- Chimwemwe Chihana-Mtawali, Zambian photographer
- Enoch Chihana, Malawian politician
- Yeremia Chihana, Malawian politician
