= Geoffrey Du Mhango =

Malawian Economist, author and politician

Geoffrey L du Mhango is a Malawian economist, author, and politician. He was born in Karonga in the northern part of Malawi. He worked as a Senior development economist at the Development Bank of Southern Africa (DBSA) based in Johannesburg, South Africa for 10 years from 1987 to 1998 and for the ministry of foreign affairs in Malawi. His interests are in creating an integrated planning model for investment in urban infrastructure and pricing municipal services. He is a member of the Karonga Natural Resources Development Committee that is charged with overseeing the infrastructure and environmental impact being as a result of a uranium mining venture by Australian company, Paladin Energyin Malawi. Karonga.

== Politics ==
Mhango is involved in national politics in Malawi. He was affiliated with AFORD (Alliance for Democracy). He served as the vice president of the political party under political activists Chakufwa Chihana's presidency. As relations with Chihana became sour due to Chihanas political alliances, he was part of the rift that opposed the leadership to Chihana and boycotted the AFORD convention in 2002. They formed a new political party, Movement for Genuine Democratic Change (Mgode) where he served as the interim chairman. By 2004 however, it was clear that there was factions in MGODE. The first camp was headed by its Secretary General Greene Rulilo Mwamondwe and MP, Nelson Kampunga Mwafulirwa. The second camp was headed by interim chairman Du Mhango. The Mwamondwe camp sympathises with National Democratic Alliance (NDA) and held rallies together. The Mhango camp claimed independent of any political alliances and wanted a party ideology dictated by party policy, rather than individual policy. The Mhango camp, wanted to make alliance that served the will of the party.

== Published works ==
- Housing situation in the traditional housing estates in Blantyre and Mzuzu - 1979
- Planning and managing socio-economic development : the integrated participatory dimension

Geoffrey L. Du Mhango 1998

- Infrastructure Mandate for Change 1994-1999...Meshack Khosa (ed)..6. Municipal Infrastructure Services: A Planning and Pricing Model for Capital Investment

Geoffrey du Mhango

== Personal life ==
In the 2004 election, he ran as an independent for member of parliament for the Karonga North district. His brother, Bazuka Mhango in the same election ran as MP for Karonga North West.

He comes from a political family and is brother to Bazuka Mhango. He is also step uncle to Du Chisiza. He is the last born in his family of 4 Brothers and one Sister. He is married to Margaret Khonje and they have 6 children and 16 Grand Children.
