= Msiska =

Msiska is a surname. Notable people with surname include:

- Lucky Msiska (born 1960), Zambian footballer and manager
- Mpalive Msiska, Malawian academic
