= Mbande Hill =

Archaeological site in Malawi

Coordinates: 9°56′50″S 33°49′50″E

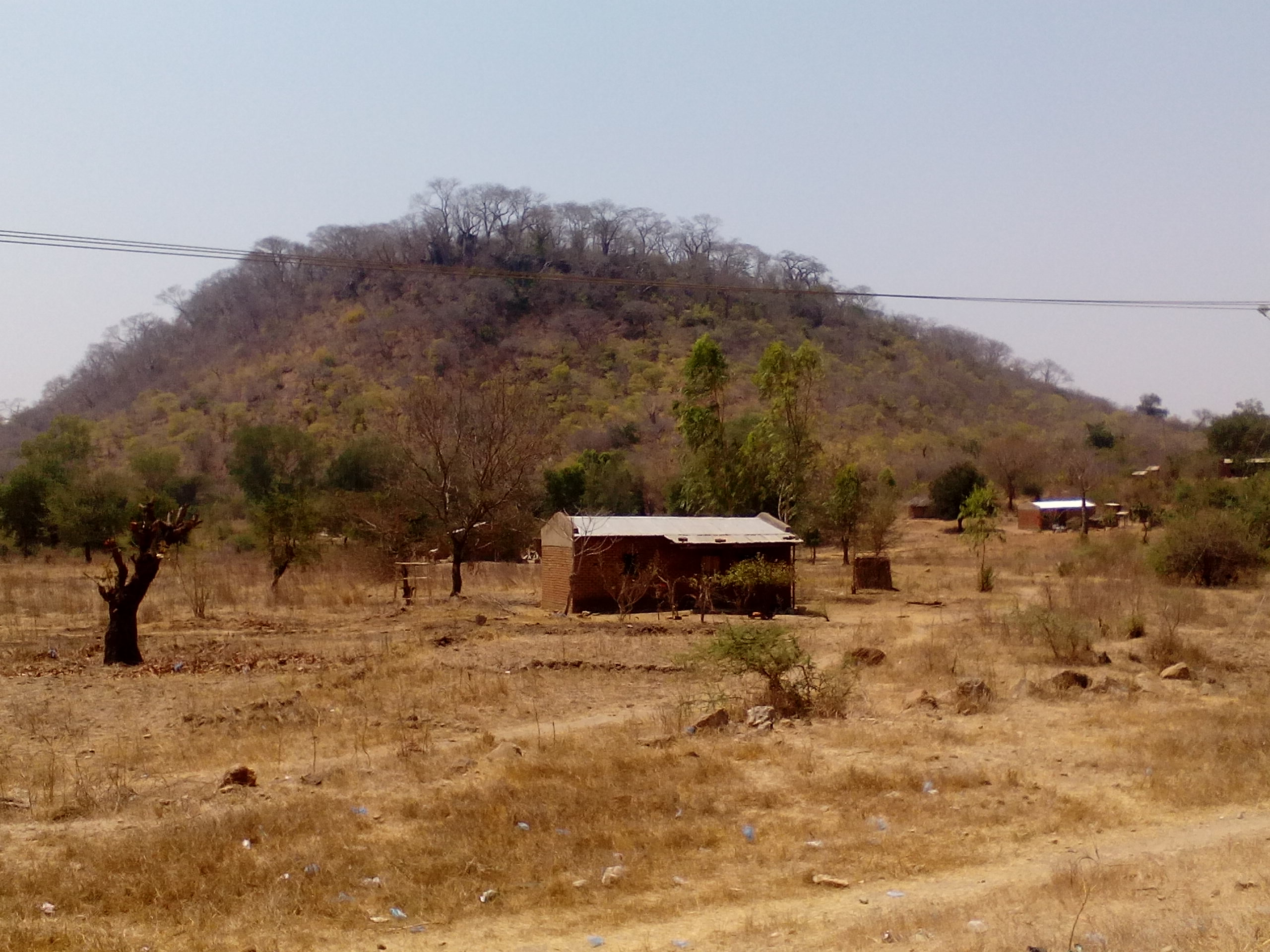
Mbande Hill

Mbande Hill is a Malawian archaeological site, located at the northern end of Lake Malawi, in Karonga district, Northern Malawi. The site has been identified as the capital of the Ngonde kingdom. Its chiefs, known as the 'Kyungu' ruled from this location. Pottery and bead finds at the site suggest it was occupied between 1500–1800 period, while the uppermost levels of excavation point to a nineteenth-century date. It is suspected that the kingdom had links with Africa's East Coast maritime trade networks. A surviving earthwork at Mbande Hill may have been part of the fortifications.
