= Phoka people =

Ethnic tribe of Malawi and Zambia

The Phoka are Tumbuka people primarily found in Malawi, Zambia and Tanzania. In Malawi, they are situated in districts of Rumphi and Karonga. In 2024, there were over 200,000 Phokas in the three countries.

== History and origin ==
The phoka date back in 1500, when they decided to leave Nyasaland under the leadership of Mnyanjaba. They decided to cross the river in search of fertile land for farming. The Phoka originally came from around the Nyika Plateau of the northern Malawi.
