= Chikulamayembe dynasty =

Dynasty of kings among the Tumbuka people in Malawi

Chikulamayembe, King of kings of the Tumbuka
- Chikulamayembe, Themba la mathemba la ŵaTumbuka; Saŵila
- Provincial

Incumbent
- Joseph Bongololo Gondwe since 30 April 2022

Details
- Style: his Majesty
- Heir apparent: To be nominated from the House of Chikulamasinda upon the Incumbent's death.
- First monarch: Khalapamuhanya
- Formed: 1805
- Residence: Bolero, Rumphi
- Website: N/A

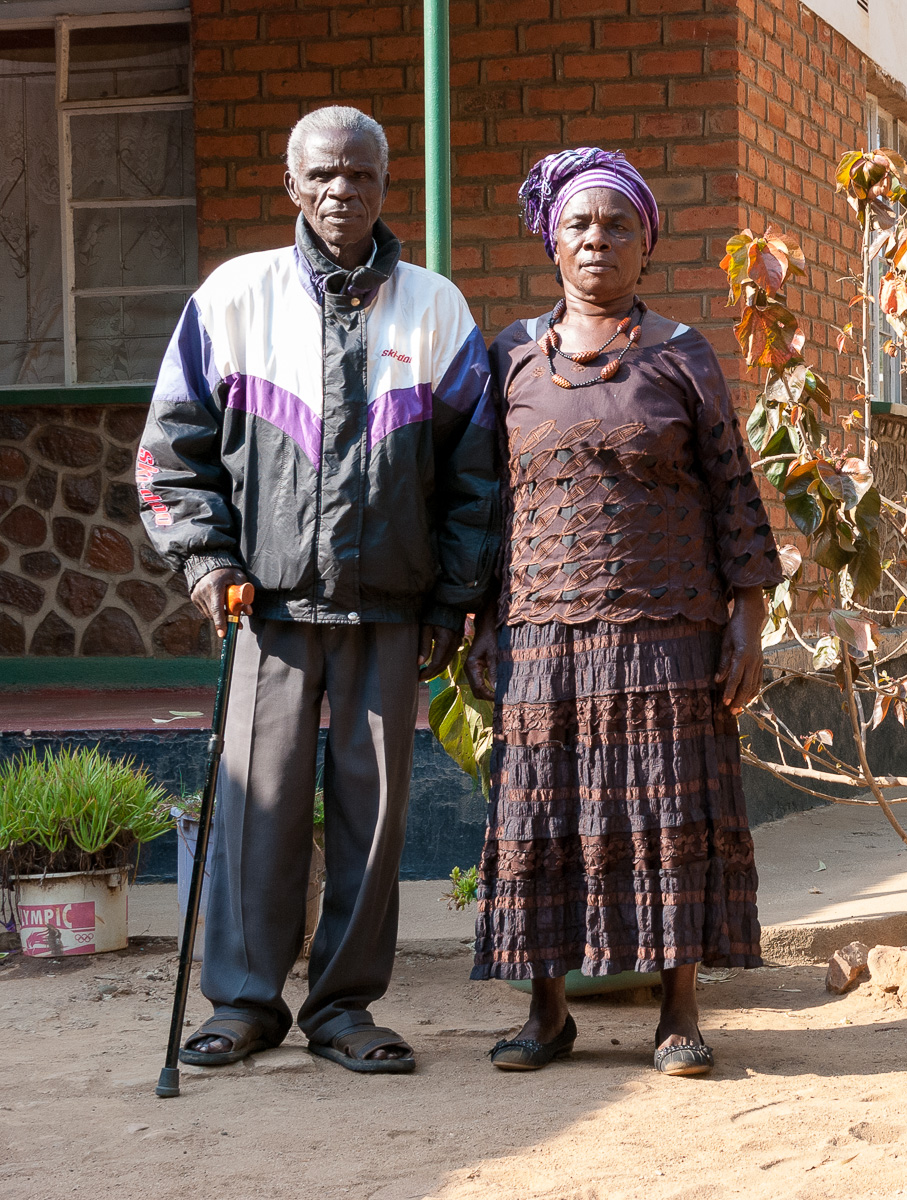
Walter Gondwe the "Chikulamayembe" from 1977 to 2018 with his wife in Bolero, Rumphi, Malawi

The Chikulamayembe are a dynasty of kings established among the Tumbuka people in the Nkhamanga-Henga area of Northern Malawi. The dynasty is conventionally dated from around 1805, weakening from the 1830s under pressure from Swahili traders and collapsing under the Ngoni invasions of the mid-nineteenth century, before being formally restored by the colonial administration in 1907. A rival scholarly account, discussed below, dates the same events differently and identifies the dynasty's founder as the son, rather than a nephew, of the trader-chief Mlowoka.

== Origins ==
=== The Tumbuka before the Balowoka ===
The Tumbuka people probably entered the area between the Luangwa valley and northern Lake Malawi in the 15th century. At the start of the 18th century, they formed a number of groups, most of which lived in homesteads growing finger millet and herding goats and sheep. These were thinly scattered over the plateau between the Luangwa valley and Lake Malawi, in small, independent communities with limited central organisation. One group, the Henga, occupied the Henga Valley north of Rumphi; another, the Phoka, lived south of the Nyika Plateau. By the 18th century, the Luangwa valley, the plains south of the Nyika Plateau and the Henga valley held significant elephant populations, and the Henga and Phoka people of these areas had local chiefs with status but limited authority.

=== Arrival of the Balowoka ===
In the 18th century, rising European demand for ivory drove an expansion of the trade in East and Central Africa, financed by merchants based at Kilwa Kisiwani and Zanzibar. By the mid-18th century, traders dressed in the style of Arab merchants, though drawn from the Unyamwezi region of what is now Tanzania, were trading for ivory as far inland as the Luangwa valley. One such group of traders, and possibly elephant hunters, arrived in the area looking for ivory among people who had until then placed little value on it; oral tradition names their leader, or the most important among them, as Mlowoka, "one who crossed [the lake]". Mlowoka is traditionally said to have landed at Chilumba on the lakeshore before moving inland to an area west of the Nyika Plateau.

Yizenge Chondoka and Frackson Bota, drawing on clan-history research by H. Leroy Vail as well as their own fieldwork in the area, give a more detailed account: the traders crossed Lake Malawi at Manda Bay between roughly 1770 and 1780, and it was the Tumbuka themselves, not the traders, who coined Balowoka (singular Mlowoka) for these easterners who had crossed the lake, a description that became a praise name obscuring the individual traders' own names. They identify the most prominent of these traders as Kakalala Chisalanda Mlowoka, remembered as a light-skinned, generous man who settled around 1775 in the Nkhamanga area within the chiefdom of Mutimbula, married into the locally influential Luhanga family, and died in 1810; other Balowoka traders who settled permanently in the region alongside him are named as Katumbi, Mwamlowe, Jumbo and Kabunduli. It is not certain whether these traders originally intended to settle permanently, but their control of the goods, including cloth, beads, conus shells and sea salt, exchanged for ivory, animal skins and other produce gave them growing economic power. They formed marriage alliances with local Henga chiefs and, to secure a monopoly over local ivory trading, established their leading followers at strategic points on the routes between the elephant-rich Henga and Phoka areas and the shore of Lake Malawi. The Balowoka have since blended fully with the Tumbuka and are no longer distinguishable as a separate group, though clan names surviving from the original Balowoka include Gondwe; among those said in oral tradition to have crossed with Mlowoka on the same "plank" were Katumbi, Kabunduli, Mwahenga, Kyungu, Chipofya and Mwamlowe. Not all Tumbuka chiefdoms were affected by Balowoka settlement: large parts of the wider M'nyanjagha kingdom, particularly in its northern, southern, eastern and western reaches, were never brought under Balowoka influence, which remained concentrated in Nkhamanga, Hewe and northern Chama.

=== Two accounts of the dynasty's founding ===
Historians disagree on exactly how the Chikulamayembe title and chieftaincy originated. Chirembo's account, on which most people generally rely, holds that a son of Mlowoka named Gonapamuhanya, also known as Khalapamuhanya, who was on his mother's side the nephew of a leading Tumbuka clan head, became paramount chief of the areas west and south of the Nyika Plateau around 1805, founding the dynasty. Chondoka and Bota instead identify Gonapamuhanya/Khalapamuhanya as Mlowoka's own son by patrilineal descent, who succeeded his father on Mlowoka's death in 1810 and was, in their account, the first ruler to actually carry the Chikhulamayembe title; on this reading, Mlowoka himself never used or was known by the name, which arose only with his son. The two accounts also differ on how much territory the resulting chieftaincy actually controlled: both agree it amounted to little more than a loose federation of small chiefdoms strung along the ivory-trading route, rather than a unified territorial kingdom, but it is argued at length that the very notion of a centralised "Chikulamayembe Kingdom" was substantially a later myth, one that hardened into orthodoxy after Saulos Nyirenda's 1909 history of the Tumbuka-Henga, translated by the missionary T. Cullen Young in 1931, exaggerated the dynasty's nineteenth-century reach in ways later accepted uncritically by the colonial administration and reinforced by the Chikulamayembe chieftaincy itself to bolster its own legitimacy.

=== Etymology of the Chikhulamayembe title ===
The origin of the title itself is likewise disputed. Three possible derivations current among the Tumbuka and in earlier missionary and colonial writing are discussed. One holds that Chikhulamayembe is a corruption of the Swahili chukua majembe ("to carry hoes"), a name the Phoka, who supplied Mlowoka with hoes for him to distribute as gifts, are said to have given him; the authors note this is hard to square with the Tumbuka's own long-standing skill at manufacturing hoes, which would have made imported ones of little value as trade goods. A second holds that the name instead commemorates Gonapamuhanya's practice, after he succeeded his father in 1810, of collecting tribute in the form of hoe blades pulled (kukhula) from their wooden handles. A third derives the name from yembe, mango, and a tribute of mango fruit that Gonapamuhanya is said to have demanded from surrounding villages. Chondoka and Bota conclude that no single explanation is fully satisfactory, but that whichever is correct, the title became attached to Gonapamuhanya personally and was carried thereafter by every subsequent head of the main Balowoka line at Nkhamanga.

== The nineteenth-century dynasty ==
By the account given in Chondoka and Bota, Gonapamuhanya (Chikhulamayembe from 1810) was succeeded not by one of his three sons, Pitamkusa, Chayeka (also called Bwati) and Mwembe, but by his nephew Kampungu, of the Nkonjela clan, in an unexplained shift from the dynasty's usual patrilineal succession; oral tradition offers no firm explanation, though the authors suggest Gonapamuhanya's own sons may simply have been too young to succeed him. Kampungu is remembered as a cruel and paranoid ruler who drove his royal cousins into exile and fought inconclusive wars against the Chewa and the Tonga; his exiled relatives eventually organised a coup, led by Gonapamuhanya's eldest son Pitamkusa, in which Kampungu and his close associate Chimundavwa were tricked out of their houses at dawn and killed by archers, restoring patrilineal succession and, according to Tumbuka tradition, ensuring that no nephew would ever again ascend to the Chikulamayembe throne.

Pitamkusa duly became the third Chikhulamayembe, succeeded by his brother Chayeka, known as Bwati I, around 1835, and then by Bwati I's son, Bwati II, around 1845. A third son of Chayeka, Bamantha, succeeded his brother Bwati II around 1850; it was during Bamantha's rule that Bemba forces under Chitimukulu Chileshe Chipele invaded the area around Hewe and Muyombe, before being driven out with the assistance of warriors sent by Chungu (Kyungu) of the Ngonde. Bamantha was briefly succeeded by Mujuma before Mkuwayila (also spelled Mkuwayira), a son of one of Pitamkusa's brothers, took the throne in 1855; Mkuwayila was killed by Ngoni forces during their invasion of the area, an event that ended the Chikulamayembe chieftaincy for the following half-century. On this count, the dynasty in its original form lasted only some eighty years, from Mlowoka's settlement around 1775 to Mkuwayila's death in 1855; Chondoka and Bota also note that Chirembo counts Mkuwayila as the eighth holder of the title, while another historian, Bridglal Pachai, counts him as the sixth, a discrepancy the authors attribute to differing assumptions about how many rulers came between Gonapamuhanya and Mkuwayila. A separate, informal explanation for the origin of the Gondwe clan name, now used throughout the Nkhamanga Balowoka lineage, traces it to Mwembe, one of Gonapamuhanya's sons, whose disability left a distinctive furrow behind him as he walked, at first mistaken by villagers for the track of a large monitor lizard, mbulu.

More broadly, McCracken and Morris describe the same period in terms of external pressure rather than internal succession disputes: from the 1830s the dynasty weakened as Swahili traders in slaves and ivory took over its trading networks, reducing it to a state of political disorganisation, before Ngoni invasions during the 1860s and 1870s brought about its final collapse. When the Chikulamayembe state ceased to exist, its people either fled or remained as unfree agricultural workers or were enrolled into Ngoni regiments.

== Revival ==
=== Choosing a Themba ===
The Northern Ngoni finally accepted British rule in 1904, and the Tumbuka people ceased to be their vassals or returned from wherever they had taken refuge. European missionaries found the Tumbuka ready to accept Western education and supported their wish to have a paramount chief of their own. The Chikulamayembe claim to chieftainship over a wide area was supported by Saulos Nyirenda's 1909 history of the Tumbuka, translated by a missionary in 1931, which greatly exaggerated the power the Chikulamayembe had actually held in the 19th century; this version of Tumbuka history was nonetheless accepted by the colonial authorities.

There were several candidates wishing to become paramount chief, all descendants of Gonapamuhanya, but the colonial administration chose Mbawuwo Mgonanjerwa Gondwe, who was westernised, and gave him the title Themba (chief) Chikulamayembe in 1907, making him paramount chief of the Tumbuka people, with other chiefs in the area subordinated to him.

=== The Themba's powers ===
At first, the role of the Themba Chikulamayembe was largely ceremonial, but in 1913 he was given a role assisting the local district commissioner. In the 1920s the colonial administration favoured the introduction of indirect rule and proposed that the north of Malawi be divided into three districts, each with one predominant ethnic group and its own paramount chief. When the Native Authority Ordinance was passed in 1933, the Themba Chikulamayembe was made native authority over all Tumbukaland, with his own budget; the passing of the Native Courts Ordinance the same year gave him appellate jurisdiction over cases from his sub-chiefs.

The first Themba died in 1931 and was succeeded by his son Ziwange, generally known as John Hardy Gondwe, who ruled from 1932 until his death in 1977, when he was succeeded by his son Walter Gondwe.

=== Succession since 2018 ===
Walter Gondwe died in late November 2018 after a two-week illness. A succession dispute followed between the installed Paramount Chief, Chikulamayembe Joseph Bongololo Gondwe, and Walter Gondwe's son Mtima Gondwe, whose supporters maintain he was wrongly passed over for the chieftaincy; Mtima Gondwe was recognised as acting Chikulamayembe from 2019 before being removed by the Malawian courts in April 2021, and Joseph Bongololo Gondwe was formally installed by President Lazarus Chakwera in April 2022, amid what press reports described as chaotic scenes. The dispute has continued to surface publicly since: it broke into open violence at the 2025 Gonapamuhanya festival, prompting Malawi's second vice-president, Enock Chihana, to publicly caution against political interference in chieftaincy succession and to insist that royal families be left free to choose their own leaders.

== List of rulers of the Nkhamanga kingdom of the Tumbuka ==
Term	Incumbent	Notes
c.1795	Foundation of Nkhamanga state
c.1810	Gonapamuhanya (a.k.a. Nkhalapamuhanya), Chikulamayembe
? to ?	Kampungu, Chikulamayembe	Nephew of Gonapamuhanya; deposed and killed in a coup
? to ?	Pitamkusa, Chikulamayembe	Led the coup against Kampungu
c.1835	Bwati I, Chikulamayembe	Originally Chayeka
c.1845	Bwati II, Chikulamayembe	Son of Bwati I
c.1850	Bamantha, Chikulamayembe	Son of Bwati I; repelled a Bemba invasion
? to 1855	Mujuma, Chikulamayembe	Brief reign between Bamantha and Mkuwayila
1855	Mkuwayira (Mkuwayila), Chikulamayembe	Killed by Ngoni forces; chieftaincy lapsed until 1907
1855 to 1907	Interregnum	No holder of the title; disputed reports of a Juwaunini Gondwe active in this period
1907 to 1931	Chilongozi (Mbawuwo Mgonanjerwa Gondwe)	Themba la mathemba, paramount chief for the whole Tumbukaland; first colonial Chikulamayembe after the dynasty's restoration. Witnesses of the coronation were Mayelele Gondwe, Hunga Bongololo Gondwe, Magomero Chaula, Chitupila Gondwe and Juwaunini Gondwe, together with the District Commissioner for Karonga.
1932 to 1977	Ziwange (John Hardy Gondwe)
1977 to 2018	Walter Gondwe
2019 to 2021	Mtima Gondwe	Acting; his supporters maintain he is the legitimate successor to Walter Gondwe
2022 to present	Joseph Bongololo Gondwe	Official reign may have started earlier in 2019

== See also ==
- Tumbuka people
- Nkhamanga Kingdom
- History of the Tumbuka people

== Sources ==
- S. B. Chirembo, (1993). Colonialism and the Remaking of the Chikulamayembe Dynasty 1904 – 1953, The Society of Malawi Journal, Vol. 46, pp. 1–24.
- Y. A. Chondoka and F. T. Bota, (2007). A History of the Tumbuka from 1400 to 1900: The Tumbuka Under the M'nyanjagha, Chewa, Balowoka, Senga, and Ngoni Chiefs, Lusaka, Academic Press, ISBN 9982500058.
- M. Douglas (1950). Peoples of the Lake Nyasa Region: East Central Africa, Part 1, London International African Institute.
- J. McCracken, (2012). A History of Malawi, 1859–1966, Woodbridge, James Currey. ISBN 978-1-84701-050-6.
- B. Morris, (2006). The Ivory Trade and Chiefdoms in Pre-Colonial Malawi, the Society of Malawi Journal, Vol. 59, No. 2, pp. 6–23.
- T. J. Thompson, (1981). The Origins, Migration and Settlement of The Northern Ngoni, The Society of Malawi Journal, Vol. 34, No. 1, pp. 6–35
- T. Cullen Young, (1931). Notes on the History of the Tumbuka-Kamanga Peoples in the Northern Province of Nyasaland, Livingstonia Mission Press.
- H. L. Vail, (1972). Suggestions Towards a Re-Interpreted Tumbuka History. In B. Pachai (ed). The Early History of Malawi. London: Longman
