= Nkhamanga Kingdom =

Kingdom in southern Africa

The Nkhamanga Kingdom was a pre-colonial kingdom located in the region of Malawi, specifically in the northern and central areas. The kingdom was established in the 18th century by the Tumbuka people, a Bantu-speaking group.

== History ==
=== Formation ===
The Tumbuka people originated from the Congo Basin and settled in the area, where they became the leading residents. The group formed a kingdom and set up a ruling class with a king as the head. They lived in a compact area where each village was headed by one particular clan such as the Luhanga or Mkandawire clans. The Tumbuka community was recognized as a peaceful society without significant central authority or taxes. Instead, they showed their appreciation for their leaders through symbolic gestures, like offering leopard or lion skins as special tributes, reflecting their emphasis on community and mutual respect.

== Early Tumbuka kingship ==
Nyanjagha Botawota's son Longwe (Longwe Botawota) became the first M'nyanjagha (king) of the Tumbuka. Longwe had four wives who bore him several children including Kazanduka (Ntuntika) who became the second M'nyanjagha.

== Ŵalowoka ==
In the late 18th century, a group of traders led by Kakalala Msawira Gondwe arrived in Nkhamanga from Nyamwezi, seeking to capitalize on the abundant elephant population and lucrative ivory trade. The region, known for its vast elephant herds, was dubbed "elephant built." The traders, dubbed the Balowoka, meaning "those who crossed the lake," had traversed Lake Malawi in dhows in 1750. They settled peacefully in the Henga valley, Hewe, and Nkhamanga, integrating into the local Tumbuka community without conflict or coercion.

== Arrival of the Ŵalowoka traders (1770–1780) ==
=== Origins and arrival ===
Between 1770 and 1780, a group of long-distance traders from the Unyamwezi country in central Tanzania crossed Lake Malawi at Manda Bay on the eastern shore and landed at Chilumba on the western shore. From Chilumba, these traders moved westward, passing through Chiweta Hills, Phwezi, Njakwa, and Nkhamanga before spreading to other parts of the M'nyanjagha Kingdom. The indigenous Tumbuka people called these foreigners "Balowoka" (singular: "Mlowoka"), meaning "those who have crossed over a body of water." This term was not a personal name but an identifier for foreigners who came into Utumbuka from across Lake Malawi.

== Kakalala Mlowoka and his influence ==
The first prominent Mlowoka to settle in the region was Kakalala Chisalanda Mlowoka, who established himself in Nkhamanga area around 1775 in the chiefdom of Mutimbula of the Luhanga clan. Described as light-skinned, kind, and extremely generous, Kakalala initially led only his Balowoka community but gradually gained influence over local Tumbuka. To strengthen his position, he married into politically powerful local clans, first taking a wife from Mubila Luhanga's family and later from the Kumwenda clan.

From his base at Nkhamanga, Kakalala Mlowoka established trade routes in the region for ivory and other commodities. The Balowoka traders brought cloth, European beads, conus shells, sea salt, and various ornaments to exchange for ivory, animal skins, dried meat, and food products. To create political alliances, Kakalala crowned loyal allies with "kamphumphu" (a dark blue fez or black-cloth turban) as a sign of their prestigious political ties.

== The Chaŵinga brothers ==
Around 1775, two Balowoka brothers from the Chabinga clan, Kapungu and Mulindawafwa, settled in M'nyanjagha's kingdom. Kapungu chose to settle in the northwestern area, eventually establishing a chiefdom called Themba Katumbi at Sitwe in Chama North. His area was prone to annual flooding of the Luwumbu River, earning him the name "Limilazamba" (cultivating crops for the floods). His younger brother, Mulindawafwa, settled in the east in a fertile plain with many musangu trees, becoming known as Themba Mulindawafwa Katumbi of Hewe.

== Origin of Chikhulamayembe ==
The name "Chikhulamayembe" first appeared during the reign of Kakalala Mlowoka's only son, Gonapamuhanya (also known as Khalapamuhanya), who ruled from 1810. While the exact origin of the name is debated, the most accepted explanation relates it to the Kiswahili term "chukuwamajembe" meaning "to carry hoes." The Phoka people, expert hoe manufacturers, began calling Gonapamuhanya "Chikulamayembe" because he distributed imported hoes as gifts to influential clans. Over time, this name evolved into "Chikhulamayembe" and became the title for all subsequent leaders of the main Balowoka clan in Nkhamanga.

== The Balowoka's impact ==
The Balowoka introduced several significant changes to Tumbuka society. They shifted the traditional matrilineal system of political succession to a patrilineal one in the areas they controlled. They created trade networks that gave economic value to resources like ivory that the Tumbuka had previously considered of limited value. The Balowoka also established new trade routes that later became important pathways for commerce throughout the region, with Nkhamanga becoming a crossroads of 19th-century trade.

Despite their influence, the Balowoka never established a unified political empire. Instead, they created loosely connected economic regions centered around trade. Their rule lasted from approximately 1775 to 1855, ending when the Ngoni killed Mkuwayila, the seventh Chikhulamayembe. The chieftaincy was only revived by the British in 1907 to help administer northern Nyasaland through indirect rule.

== Creation of the kingdom ==
The Balowoka traders played a crucial role in the formation of the Nkhamanga State. There are two competing theories that attempt to explain how they managed to establish their political influence in the Tumbuka region. The first theory suggests that they leveraged their trading prowess to gain power, while the second theory proposes that they used military force to conquer and dominate the area. These two theories offer different perspectives on the Balowoka's rise to political authority.

=== The trade theory ===
The trade theory suggests that Mlowoka, a wealthy trader, established the Nkhamanga State through his business ventures. He formed friendships with local chiefs, exchanging goods like clothes, beads, and hoes for ivory and leopard skins. By marrying into powerful families like the Luhanga and Kumwenda, Mlowoka solidified his ties to the region and strengthened his economic influence. When his father-in-law, Mubila Luhanga, died, Mlowoka's son, Gonapamuhanya, ascended to the throne, cementing the Balowoka's political power. However, some historians, like Leroy Vail, disagree with this theory, viewing Mlowoka as merely a merchant seeking fortune, rather than a political leader who established a kingdom.

=== The invader theory ===
Historians Saulos Nyirenda and Cullen Young supported the theory that Mlowoka, a political leader, founded the Nkhamanga State. They argued that Mlowoka's marriages into the Luhanga and Kumwenda families enabled him to exert political influence, introducing administrative and coronation practices that fostered peace among the Tumbuka people. Mlowoka's military presence expanded the kingdom's reach, stretching from the South Rukuru River to Bisa country in the west and Lake Malawi in the east. When Mlowoka died, his son Gonapamuhanya inherited the throne, solidifying the Balowoka dynasty's grip on the region.

== Mlowoka's strategies ==
Mlowoka's strategic gift-giving and intermarriage with the Tumbuka families of Luhanga and Kumwenda earned him their support and acceptance as a relative. He gained the people's trust through fair and generous trade practices, respecting their customs and traditions. He showed reverence for their beliefs by paying annual tribute to the Mwadandambi shrine and honoring clan heads with symbolic turbans. By distributing valuable holes (likely a valuable resource for farming or craftsmanship), he won their admiration and was hailed as Chikulamayembe, meaning "the distributor of holes.
