= Katawa, Mzuzu =

- Location within Malawi
- Coordinates: 10°55′59″S 34°01′00″E
- Country: Malawi
- Region: Northern Region, Malawi
- Municipality: Mzuzu
- Established: 1965

Government
  - Type: Unitary presidential republic

Area
  - Total: 11.00 km^{2} (4.25 sq mi)

Population (2018)
  - Total: 15,529
  - Density: 1,412/km^{2} (3,656/sq mi)

Racial makeup (2018)
  - Black African: 98.5%
  - Asian: 0.8%
  - White Malawian: 0.7%

First languages (2018)
  - Tumbuka: 94.0%
  - Chewa: 3.0%
  - Tonga: 2.0%
  - Other: 1.0%
- Time zone: UTC+2 (CAT)

Katawa is a populated township in Northern Region, Malawi. It is located in the Northern Region of the Mzuzu. Its neighbourhood include Luwinga, Mchengautuba, Chiwavi and Chibanja. It is home to the Malawi's gospel singers, the Katawa Singers.

== Geography ==
Katawa is located North-West of Mzuzu city.

== History ==
Kataba got its name from White birds that inhabited the area.

== Institutions ==
Institutions found in Katawa include:

- Katawa C.C.A.P. Church Presbyterian Church
- Mzuzu Technical Colledge
- Katawa Secondary School
- Katawa Primary School
- St John Of God Hospital
