= Ching'ambo =

Place in Mzuzu, Malawi

Ching'ambu, Mzuzu
- Location within Malawi
- Coordinates: 11°23′15″S 33°59′11″E
- Country: Malawi
- Region: Northern Region, Malawi
- Municipality: Mzuzu
- Established: 1950

Government
  - Type: Unitary presidential republic

Area
  - Total: 28.00 km^{2} (10.81 sq mi)

Population (2018)
  - Total: 29,924
  - Density: 1,069/km^{2} (2,768/sq mi)

Racial makeup (2018)
  - Black African: 97.1%
  - Asian: 1.6%
  - White: 1.3%

First languages (2018)
  - Tumbuka: 95.6%
  - Tonga: 2.1%
  - Chewa: 1.2%
  - Other: 2.1%
- Time zone: UTC+2 (CAT)

Ching'ambu, Mzuzu (Tumbuka: Wetness) is a residential town in Mzuzu. It is located West of Mzuzu, Northern Region, Malawi. It is a home to Ching'ambu United Team, as well as Ching'ambu FC. Chitumbuka is the predominant language spoken in the area which is also the official regional language of the Northern Region of Malawi. Nearby towns include Luwinga, Chibanja, and Zolozolo.

The town is located in the peri-urban area, along with Chiputula. In March 2024, heavy rains cut off the Chiputula-Ching'ambo Road.

== Institutions ==
- Ching’ambo Mother Caregivers Simwanza
- Ching'ambu Community Garden
- Ching'ambu Orphan Care
- Ching'ambu Primary School
- Ching'ambu Community Day Secondary School
