= Lupaso =

Place in Mzuzu, Malawi

Lupaso, Mzuzu
- Location within Malawi
- Coordinates: 11°23′15″S 33°59′11″E
- Country: Malawi
- Region: Northern Region, Malawi
- Municipality: Mzuzu
- Established: 1950

Government
  - Type: Unitary presidential republic

Area
  - Total: 28.00 km^{2} (10.81 sq mi)

Population (2018)
  - Total: 29,924
  - Density: 1,069/km^{2} (2,768/sq mi)

Racial makeup (2018)
  - Black African: 99.7%
  - Asian: 0.2%
  - White: 0.1%

First languages (2018)
  - Tumbuka: 98.6%
  - Tonga: 1.1%
  - Chewa: 0.2%
  - Other: 0.1%
- Time zone: UTC+2 (CAT)

Lupaso is a residential town in Mzuzu. It is located North of Mzuzu, Northern Region, Malawi.

== Description ==
Lupaso is the home to Lupaso United Football Team, as well as Lupaso FC. Chitumbuka is the predominant language spoken in the area which is also the official regional language of the Northern Region of Malawi. Nearby towns include Luwinga, Dunduzu and Nkholongo.

In 2017, a group of Irish women raised money for the charity Wells for Zoe which was intended to re-roof a community centre and to install a water pump to assist women in Lupaso.

Lupaso Community Day Secondary School in Lupaso had 250 pupils in 2018. Classes start at 7:30am and although most can get there in 15 minutes, some have to walk for over an hour. The school was led by Wezzie Kacheche Banda. In 2017 a teacher from Holmfirth High School visiting Malawi found this school that Holmfirth could twin with. This led to pupils and staff visiting from Yorkshire. Funds raised by 2019 allowed improvements to the Lupaso school's infrastructure.

In 2023 Lupaso made the media when it emerged that their community development fund had paid a large bill for the construction of a small toilet for the use of under fives. The bill included hundreds of bags of concrete and a list of building material that was not present in the final construction.

== Institutions ==
- Lupaso Admarc
- Lupaso Church of Christ
- Lupaso CCAP Church
- Lupaso Primary School
- Lupaso Community Day Secondary School
