= Dunduzu =

Place in Mzuzu, Malawi

Dunduzu, Mzuzu
- Location within Malawi
- Coordinates: 11°23′15″S 33°59′11″E
- Country: Malawi
- Region: Northern Region, Malawi
- Municipality: Mzuzu
- Established: 1940

Government
  - Type: Unitary presidential republic

Area
  - Total: 42.00 km^{2} (16.22 sq mi)

Population (2018)
  - Total: 19,512
  - Density: 464.6/km^{2} (1,203/sq mi)

Racial makeup (2018)
  - Black African: 98.1%
  - Asian: 1.1%
  - White: 0.8%

First languages (2018)
  - Tumbuka: 98.1%
  - Tonga: 1.1%
  - Chewa: 0.7%
  - Other: 2.1%
- Time zone: UTC+2 (CAT)

Dunduzu, Mzuzu is a residential town in the outskirts of Mzuzu. It is located North of Mzuzu, Northern Region, Malawi. It connects Ekwendeni and Lupaso. It is a home to Dunduzu FC. Chitumbuka is the predominant language spoken in the area which is also the official regional language of the Northern Region of Malawi. Nearby towns include Luwinga, and Nkholongo.

You Are Not Alone (YANA) is a foundation founded in 2021 in Dunduzu. It was founded by local single parent Tusayiwe Mkhondya. Her son was born when she was sixteen and he was autistic. She realised that he was being mistreated at school and she decided to open her own school. She began to foster other children and the facility grew.

== Institutions ==
- Dunduzu Road Block Post
- Mzuzu Youth Centre
- Dunduzu Primary School
- Dunduzu Community Day Secondary School
- Dunduzu village lodge

* Orton Chirwa International Airport (proposed)

== See also ==
- List of towns in Mzuzu
- Luwinga
