= Edingeni =

Town in Mzimba District, Malawi

Edingeni, Mzimba
- Location within Malawi
- Coordinates: 11°05′06″S 33°35′11″E
- Country: Malawi
- Region: Northern Region, Malawi
- Municipality: Mzimba
- Established: 1898

Government
  - Type: Unitary presidential republic

Area
  - Total: 28.30 km^{2} (10.93 sq mi)

Population (2018)
  - Total: 9,994
  - Density: 353.1/km^{2} (914.6/sq mi)

Racial makeup (2018)
  - Black African: 95.2%
  - Asian: 0.2%
  - White: 0.2%
  - Mixed: 0.2%
  - Other: 1.1%

First languages (2018)
  - Tumbuka: 98.6%
  - Tonga: 3.1%
  - Ngonde: 0.2%
  - Other: 3.1%
- Time zone: UTC+2 (CAT)

Edingeni is a residential town in Mzimba, Malawi, southeast Africa. It is located North of Mzimba in the Northern Region. It is a home to Edingeni FC. Chitumbuka is the predominant language spoken in the area which is also the official regional language of the Northern Region of Malawi. The town has a rich history dating back to the pre-colonial era, when it was a small village inhabited by the Tumbuka people.

The town is home to the current Ngoni King M'mbelwa V who is the ruler of the town.

== History ==
=== Founding ===
Edingeni was established as a trading post by the British colonial administration in the early 20th century. The town rapidly grew, and by the 1920s, it had become a significant commercial hub in the region. Its strategic location made it an essential center for trade and commerce, and it quickly became a hub for agricultural production, particularly coffee and cotton.

== Geography ==
Edingeni is situated in the Mzimba district of Malawi, in the northern region of the country. It lies approximately 25 kilometers north of the town of Mzuzu and about 15 kilometers south of the town of Ekwendeni. The town is located in a valley, surrounded by hills and mountains.

=== Geographical coordinates ===
Edingeni is located at latitudes 11.05° S and longitudes 33.35° E.

== Institutions ==
Edingeni is home to several institutions, including:

- Edingeni Primary School: a primary school providing education to local children
- Edingeni Clinic: a healthcare facility offering medical services to the local population
- Edingeni Market: a bustling market where locals sell fresh produce, crafts, and other goods
- Edingeni Post Office: a post office providing postal services to the local community

== Demographics ==
Edingeni has a population of approximately 9,500 people, predominantly from the Tumbuka ethnic group. The other tribe are the Ngoni tribe.

== Economy ==
The economy of Edingeni is primarily based on agriculture, with many residents engaged in small-scale farming. The town is also home to several small businesses, including shops and restaurants.

== Infrastructure ==
Edingeni has several infrastructure developments, including:

- A tarred road connecting the town to the nearby city of Mzuzu
- Several shops and businesses
- A healthcare facility and several clinics
- A primary school and several community centers

== See also ==
- Luwinga
