= Chimaliro, Mzuzu =

Place in Mzuzu, Malawi

- Location within Malawi
- Coordinates: 11°23′16″S 33°59′11″E
- Country: Malawi
- Region: Northern Region, Malawi
- Municipality: Mzuzu
- Established: 1950

Government
  - Type: Unitary presidential republic

Area
  - Total: 28.00 km^{2} (10.81 sq mi)

Population (2018)
  - Total: 46,924
  - Density: 1,676/km^{2} (4,340/sq mi)

Racial makeup (2018)
  - Black African: 95.1%
  - Asian: 2.6%
  - White: 1.3%

First languages (2018)
  - Tumbuka: 96.6%
  - Tonga: 3.1%
  - Chewa: 1.2%
  - Other: 2.1%
- Time zone: UTC+2 (CAT)

Chimaliro, Mzuzu is a residential town in Mzuzu, Malawi, southeast Africa. It is located West of Mzuzu in the Northern Region. It is a home to Chimaliro FC. Chitumbuka is the predominant language spoken in the area which is also the official regional language of the Northern Region of Malawi. Nearby towns include Katoto.

== Institutions ==
- Mzuzu Nursery Crisis
- Chimaliro Orphan Care
- Chatonda Lodge
- Chimaliro Primary School
- Chimaliro Community Day Secondary School

== See also ==
- Luwinga
