= Kaning'ina =

Place in Mzuzu, Malawi

Kaning'ina, Mzuzu
- Location within Malawi
- Coordinates: 11°24′16″S 33°59′11″E
- Country: Malawi
- Region: Northern Region, Malawi
- Municipality: Mzuzu
- Established: 1890

Government
  - Type: Unitary presidential republic

Area
  - Total: 39.00 km^{2} (15.06 sq mi)

Population (2018)
  - Total: 13,924
  - Density: 357.0/km^{2} (924.7/sq mi)

Racial makeup (2018)
  - Black African: 94.0%
  - Asian: 1.4%
  - White: 1.3%
  - Mixed: 1.1%
  - Other: 1.1%

First languages (2018)
  - Tumbuka: 97.6%
  - Tonga: 3.1%
  - Ngonde: 0.2%
  - Other: 2.1%
- Time zone: UTC+2 (CAT)

Kaning'ina is a residential town in Mzuzu in the northern region of Malawi. The town has a rich history dating back to the pre-colonial era, when it was a small village inhabited by the Tumbuka people. The town is home to the Kaning'ina Lions Football Club.

== History ==
=== Establishments ===
Kaning'ina was established as a short-lived mission by Robert Laws and William Koyi in 1878. Attempting to convert the Ngoni people to Christianity, the station would only last a year.

A trading post by the British colonial administration in the early 20th century was established. It became a major commercial center in the region with increased development around Mzuzu.

=== Location ===
Kaning'ina is located in the Mzimba district of Malawi, in the northern region of the country. It is situated approximately 30 kilometers north of the town of Mzuzu, and about 10 kilometers south of the town of Ekwendeni. The town is nestled in a valley, surrounded by rolling hills and mountains.

=== Latitudes and longitudes ===
Kaning'ina is located at latitudes 11.10° S and longitudes 33.40° E.

== Demographics ==
Kaning'ina has a population of approximately 2,500 people, who are predominantly from the Tumbuka ethnic group.

== Economy ==
The economy of Kaning'ina is primarily based on agriculture, with many residents engaged in small-scale farming. The town is also home to a number of small businesses, including shops, restaurants, and lodges.

== See also ==
- Luwinga
