= Masasa, Mzuzu =

Place in Mzuzu, Malawi

- Location within Malawi
- Coordinates: 11°25′07″S 33°59′40″E
- Country: Malawi
- Region: Northern Region, Malawi
- Municipality: Mzuzu
- Established: 1960

Government
  - Type: Unitary presidential republic

Area
  - Total: 45.00 km^{2} (17.37 sq mi)

Population (2018)
  - Total: 188,329
  - Density: 4,185/km^{2} (10,840/sq mi)

Racial makeup (2018)
  - Black African: 98.1%
  - Asian: 0.6%
  - White: 0.3%

First languages (2018)
  - Tumbuka: 92.0%
  - Chewa: 6.0%
  - Tonga: 3.0%
  - Other: 2.0%
- Time zone: UTC+2 (CAT)

Masasa is a densely populated township in Northern Region, Malawi. It is located in the Northern Region of the Mzuzu.Masasa is known for its beautiful landscapes and serene environment. The area is also home to several regional parks and recreational facilities.

== Geography ==
Masasa is situated West of Mzuzu city. It is close to places such as Katoto. It is near Nkhata Bay District.

== Institutions ==
=== Masasa Community Day Secondary School ===
Masasa CDSS (Community Day Secondary School) is located in about 45 minutes walk, South-West, from the centre of Mzuzu in Masasa. The Day Secondary Schools cost around £7 per term, and boarding schools from £20 to £70 per term. The School has over 9 teachers and over 200 students taught in four Forms.

=== Masasa Primary School ===
Masasa Primary School is located in South of Masasa and serves as the community primary school.

=== Chideso Childcare and Community Assistant ===
- The ‘Child Development Support Organization’, also called Chideso for short, is a community-based organisation in Masasa in Mzuzu city in the north of Malawi. The organization was established in 2007 and is registered with the Ministry of Gender, Women, Children and Community Development Services.
- North Nyasa Institute of Management
