= Chibanja, Mzuzu =

Town in Mzuzu, Malawi

- Location within Malawi
- Coordinates: 10°55′59″S 34°03′00″E
- Country: Malawi
- Region: Northern Region, Malawi
- Municipality: Mzuzu
- Established: 1960

Government
  - Type: Unitary presidential republic

Area
  - Total: 9.00 km^{2} (3.47 sq mi)

Population (2018)
  - Total: 16,909
  - Density: 1,880/km^{2} (4,870/sq mi)

Racial makeup (2018)
  - Black African: 90.0%
  - Asian: 4.5%
  - White Malawian: 3.5%
  - Other: 1.0%

First languages (2018)
  - Tumbuka: 93.7%
  - Tonga: 2.1%
  - Other: 4.2%
- Time zone: UTC+2 (CAT)

Chibanja is a populated township in the city of Mzuzu, Northern Region, Malawi. The town is home to Mzuzu Airport, the biggest airport in the Northern Region of international quality and third biggest in Malawi.

It is located in the North of Mzuzu. Its neighbourhood include Luwinga, Chibavi, Mchengautuba and Zolozolo.

== Geography ==
Chibanja is located North of Mzuzu city.

== History ==
The name 'Chibanja' came in presence due to the town being close to the airport of Mzuzu. Chibanja is the Tumbuka word that means 'airport'.

== Institutions ==
Institutions found in Chibanja include:

- Mzuzu Airport
- ChibanjaC.C.A.P. Church Presbyterian Church
- Chibanja Technical Colledge
- Chibanja Secondary School
- Chibanja Primary School
