= Area 1B, Mzuzu =

Place in Mzuzu, Malawi

- Location within Malawi
- Coordinates: 11°24′14″S 33°59′54″E
- Country: Malawi
- Region: Northern Region, Malawi
- Municipality: Mzuzu
- Established: 1975

Government
  - Type: Unitary presidential republic

Area
  - Total: 41.40 km^{2} (15.98 sq mi)

Population (2018)
  - Total: 189,120
  - Density: 4,568/km^{2} (11,830/sq mi)

Racial makeup (2018)
  - Black African: 94.1%
  - Asian: 4.6%
  - White: 2.3%

First languages (2018)
  - Tumbuka: 95.0%
  - Chewa: 2.0%
  - Tonga: 1.0%
  - Other: 2.0%
- Time zone: UTC+2 (CAT)

Area 1B is a residential town in Luwinga, Mzuzu. It is located in the Northern Region of Malawi It’s known for its beautiful landscapes and serene environment, as well as the area is also home to several parks and recreational facilities. The town is home to Area 1B FC. In 2018, about 320 people in Area 1B lost their homes following heavy rains that the City experienced.

== Institutions ==
- Success Private Secondary School
- Area 1B Secondary School
- Area 1B Primary School
