= Moyale, Mzuzu =

- Location within Malawi
- Coordinates: 10°53′58″S 34°01′00″E
- Country: Malawi
- Region: Northern Region, Malawi
- Municipality: Mzuzu
- Established: 1920

Government
  - Type: Unitary presidential republic

Area
  - Total: 10.00 km^{2} (3.86 sq mi)

Population (2018)
  - Total: 29,529
  - Density: 2,953/km^{2} (7,648/sq mi)

Racial makeup (2018)
  - Black African: 97.2%
  - Asian: 1.9%
  - White Malawian: 1.9%

First languages (2018)
  - Tumbuka: 85.0%
  - Chewa: 5.7%
  - Tonga: 4.1%
  - Other: 5.2%
- Time zone: UTC+2 (CAT)

Moyale is a populated township in Northern Region, Malawi. It is located inside Mzuzu city in Mzimba District. Its neighbourhood include Luwinga, and Chiputula. The town is home to the Moyale Football Club and Moyale Barracks.

== Geography ==
Moyale is located North-West of Mzuzu city.

== History ==
Moyale was established in 1920 when the city of Mzuzu was being divided into wards.

== Institutions ==
Institutions found in Moyale include:

- Moyale Barracks
- Moyale C.C.A.P. Church Presbyterian Church
- Moyale Secondary School
- Moyale Primary School
