= Chibavi, Mzuzu =

- Location within Malawi
- Coordinates: 10°54′59″S 34°01′00″E
- Country: Malawi
- Region: Northern Region, Malawi
- Municipality: Mzuzu
- Established: 1921

Government
  - Type: Unitary presidential republic

Area
  - Total: 10.00 km^{2} (3.86 sq mi)

Population (2018)
  - Total: 12,529
  - Density: 1,253/km^{2} (3,245/sq mi)

Racial makeup (2018)
  - Black African: 96.3%
  - Asian: 1.9%
  - White Malawian: 1.8%

First languages (2018)
  - Tumbuka: 90.0%
  - Chewa: 3.7%
  - Tonga: 3.1%
  - Other: 3.2%
- Time zone: UTC+2 (CAT)

Chibavi, also written as Chiwavi, is a populated township in Northern Region, Malawi. It is located in Mzuzu city. Its neighbourhood include Luwinga, Mchengautuba, and Chiputula. The area is known for its violence.

== Geography ==
Chibavi is located North-West of Mzuzu city. The area is located east of Mchengautuwa (literary: white sand) river. The population was recorded as 12,529 in over 2,088 households, of which 207 were sampled.

== History ==
Chibavi got its name from deadly Caterpillars that were common in the area. It is a Tumbuka word that means "caterpillar".

== Institutions ==
Institutions found in Chibavi include:

- Chibavi C.C.A.P. Church Presbyterian Church
- Mzuzu Technical Colledge
- Chibavi Secondary School
- Chibavi Primary School
