= Mchengautuwa =

Place in Mzuzu, Malawi

Mchengautuba, Mzuzu
- Location within Malawi
- Coordinates: 11°23′14″S 33°59′11″E
- Country: Malawi
- Region: Northern Region, Malawi
- Municipality: Mzuzu
- Established: 1950

Government
  - Type: Unitary presidential republic

Area
  - Total: 30.00 km^{2} (11.58 sq mi)

Population (2018)
  - Total: 30,924
  - Density: 1,031/km^{2} (2,670/sq mi)

Racial makeup (2018)
  - Black African: 96.1%
  - Asian: 2.6%
  - White: 2.3%

First languages (2018)
  - Tumbuka: 91.7%
  - Chewa: 3.1%
  - Tonga: 3.2%
  - Other: 2.0%
- Time zone: UTC+2 (CAT)

Mchengautuba (Tumbuka: White sands) is a residential and industrial town in Mzuzu. It is located North of Mzuzu, Northern Region, Malawi. It is a home to Mchengautuba United Team, as well as Mchengautuba FC. Chitumbuka is the predominant language spoken in the area which is also the official regional language of the Northern Region of Malawi. Nearby towns include Luwinga, Chibanja, Zolozolo, and Ching'ambo.

== Institutions ==
- Mchengautuwa Police station
- Mchengautuwa Assemblies of God Church
- TotalEnergies Mchengautuba
- Mchengautuba CCAP Church
- Mchengautuba Orphan Care
- Mchengautuba Primary School
- Mchengautuba Community Day Secondary School
