= Mzalangwe =

Town in Mzimba District, Malawi

- Location within Malawi
- Coordinates: 11°27′00″S 33°59′50″E
- Country: Malawi
- Region: Northern Region, Malawi
- Municipality: Mzimba District
- Established: 1910

Area
  - Total: 50.14 km^{2} (19.36 sq mi)

Population (2018)
  - Total: 27,720
  - Density: 552.9/km^{2} (1,432/sq mi)

Racial makeup (2018)
  - Black African: 97.5%
  - Asian: 1.2%
  - White Malawians: 1.1%
  - Other: 0.2%

First languages (2018)
  - Tumbuka: 88.8%
  - Chewa: 4.0%
  - Tonga: 3.2%
  - Ngonde: 1.0%
  - Other: 3.0%
- Time zone: UTC+2
- Postal code: 4000
- Post-office box: 4440

Mzalangwe is a residential town in Mzimba District, Malawi. The town is home to Mzalangwe Health Care and is located West of Mzimba in the Northern Region. Chitumbuka is the predominant language spoken in the area which is also the official regional language of the Northern Region of Malawi. Nearby towns include Euthini and Mbalachanda.

The estimated terrain elevation above the sea level is about 1,301 metres.

== Institutions ==
- Mzalangwe Health Centre
- Mzalangwe Orphan Care
- Mzalangwe Primary School
- Mzalangwe Community Day Secondary School
