= Mbalachanda =

Town in Mzimba District, Malawi

- Location within Malawi
- Coordinates: 11°27′00″S 33°59′51″E
- Country: Malawi
- Region: Northern Region, Malawi
- Municipality: Mzimba District
- Established: 1920

Area
  - Total: 70.14 km^{2} (27.08 sq mi)

Population (2018)
  - Total: 19,120
  - Density: 272.6/km^{2} (706.0/sq mi)

Racial makeup (2018)
  - Black African: 98.5%
  - Asian: 0.3%
  - White Malawians: 0.2%
  - Mixed: 0.1%
  - Other: 0.9%

First languages (2018)
  - Tumbuka: 96.1%
  - Chewa: 1.2%
  - Tonga: 1.3%
  - Ngonde: 0.4%
  - Other: 1.0%
- Time zone: UTC+2

Mbalachanda is a residential town in Mzimba District, Malawi. The town is located in Mbalachanda Ward and is home to Mbalachanda Health Care. It is located East of Mzimba in the Northern Region. Chitumbuka is the predominant language spoken in the area which is also the official regional language of the Northern Region of Malawi. Nearby towns include Mzalangwe, among others.Mbalachanda was created in 1979 as one of ten 'Rural Growth Centers' developed under a German Technical Aid project.

== Institutions ==
- Mbalachanda Health Centre
- Mbalachanda Orphan Care
- Mbalachanda Health Centre
- Mbalachanda Primary School
- Mbalachanda Community Day Secondary School
