= Zolozolo, Mzuzu =

Town in Northern Region, Malawi

- Location within Malawi
- Coordinates: 11°26′10″S 34°01′22″E
- Country: Malawi
- Region: Northern Region, Malawi
- Municipality: Mzuzu
- Established: 1960

Government
  - Type: Unitary presidential republic

Area
  - Total: 14.00 km^{2} (5.41 sq mi)

Population (2018)
  - Total: 188,329
  - Density: 13,450/km^{2} (34,840/sq mi)

Racial makeup (2018)
  - Black African: 98.0%
  - Asian: 1.0%
  - White: 1.0%

First languages (2018)
  - Tumbuka: 91.0%
  - Chewa: 5.0%
  - Tonga: 2.0%
  - Other: 2.0%
- Time zone: UTC+2 (CAT)

Zolozolo is a densely populated township in Mzuzu, Northern Region, Malawi. It is located north of Mzuzu. The township is reported to have massive gang activities and high levels of accident. It is known for its lively markets and rich cultural scene.

== Geography ==
Zolozolo is located in the outskirts of Mzuzu close to other residential places such as Ching'ambu and Chiputula.

== Hospitals, clinics and police stations ==
Zolozolo is home to several local and private hospitals, clinics and police stations. Notable clinics include:

- Zolozolo Clinic
- Zolozolo private hospital
- Zolozolo Police station

== Sports ==
Zolozolo has several local sports teams that play different sporting games. Some notable sport games in Zolozolo include football. Some teams include:

=== Zolozolo United ===
Zolozolo United is a team that plays on behalf of the community. It plays with different nearby teams. In 2016, Simama League outfited Zolozolo United for the FISD Challenge Cup after beating Dwangwa Town Hammers of the Chipuku League by 1-0 in the round of 16 at Mzuzu Stadium.

== Schools ==
- Zolozolo Secondary School
- Zolozolo Primary School
