= Tumbuka parts of speech =

Parts of speech of Tumbuka language

Chitumbuka
- Native to: Malaŵi, Zambia, Tanzania
- Language family: Niger–Congo?: Atlantic–Congo; Benue–Congo; Bantu; Chitumbuka

Language codes
- ISO 639-3: tum

Tumbuka parts of speech describe the grammatical categories used in the Tumbuka language to classify words according to their function in a sentence. Like many Bantu languages, Tumbuka grammar relies heavily on noun classes, agreement markers, and affixes that modify word meaning and grammatical role.

In Tumbuka, words can be grouped into several main parts of speech including nouns, pronouns, verbs, adjectives, adverbs, conjunctions, and interjections. These categories help explain how sentences are formed and how words interact through agreement and inflection.

== Overview ==
The structure of Tumbuka grammar reflects the general characteristics of Bantu languages. Words are often built from a root combined with prefixes and suffixes which indicate grammatical information such as tense, number, noun class, or possession.

The major parts of speech in Tumbuka include:

1. Substantives signify concrete or abstract concepts:
  1. Nouns
  2. Pronouns
2. Qualificatives qualify substantives:
  1. Adjectives
  2. Relatives
  3. Enumeratives
  4. Possessives
3. Predicatives signify an action or state connected with the substantive:
  1. Verbs
  2. Copulatives
4. Descriptives describe qualificatives, predicatives, or other descriptives:
  1. Adverbs
  2. Ideophones
5. Conjunctives introduce or join up sentences
6. Interjectives are exclamations

These categories may overlap through morphological processes such as derivation and agreement with noun classes.

== Nouns ==
Nouns in Tumbuka represent people, places, objects, or abstract ideas. Like other Bantu languages, Tumbuka nouns belong to a system of noun classes, each marked by a specific prefix.

Examples include:

- munthu – person
- ŵanthu – people
- mwana – child
- ŵana – children

Noun classes determine agreement patterns with verbs, adjectives, and pronouns within a sentence.

== Pronouns ==
Pronouns are words used in place of nouns or to refer back to previously mentioned nouns. In Tumbuka they often reflect the noun class or person being referred to.

Common pronouns include the following:

- ine – I / me
- iwe – you (singular)
- iyo – he / she
- ise – we
- imwe – you (plural)
- iwo – they

Pronouns may function as subjects, objects, or emphatic forms.

== Verbs ==
Verbs describe actions, processes, or states of being. Tumbuka verbs consist of a root combined with prefixes that mark subject agreement, tense, aspect, and sometimes object agreement.

For example:

- kulya – to eat
- wakulya – you are eating
- tikulya – we are eating

Verb forms may also indicate tense distinctions such as past, present, and future.

== Adjectives ==
Adjectives describe nouns and must agree with the noun class of the noun they modify. In many cases they take prefixes similar to those used with nouns.

Examples include:

- mukulu – big
- muchoko – small
- wemi – good

Adjectives may appear after the noun they modify.

== Adverbs ==
Adverbs describe how, when, or where an action occurs. They usually modify verbs, adjectives, or entire clauses.

Examples include:

- sono – now
- mwaluŵiro – quickly
- kuno – here

Some adverbs are derived from nouns or adjectives.

== Possessives ==
Possessive forms indicate ownership or association. They are often formed with possessive concords that agree with the noun class.

Examples include:

- nyumba yane – my house
- ŵana ŵake – his or her children

== Conjunctions ==
Conjunctions connect words, phrases, or clauses.

Common conjunctions include:

- na – and
- panji – or
- kuti – that

They help form complex sentences and coordinate ideas.

== Interjections ==
Interjections are words or expressions used to convey emotion, surprise, or reaction. They often appear independently of sentence structure.

Examples include:

- ee! – yes!
- yayi! – no!
- aah! – expression of surprise or realization

== See also ==
- Tumbuka language
- Tumbuka grammar
- Bantu languages
