= Nkhorongo =

Place in Mzuzu, Malawi

Nkhorongo, Mzuzu
- Location within Malawi
- Coordinates: 11°23′14″S 33°59′11″E
- Country: Malawi
- Region: Northern Region, Malawi
- Municipality: Mzuzu
- Established: 1955

Government
  - Type: Unitary presidential republic

Area
  - Total: 42.00 km^{2} (16.22 sq mi)

Population (2018)
  - Total: 199,224
  - Density: 4,743/km^{2} (12,290/sq mi)

Racial makeup (2018)
  - Black African: 95.1%
  - Asian: 3.6%
  - White: 2.3%

First languages (2018)
  - Tumbuka: 93.0%
  - Chewa: 3.0%
  - Tonga: 2.0%
  - Other: 2.0%
- Time zone: UTC+2 (CAT)

Nkhorongo (lit. 'Scattered trees' in Tumbuka) is a residential town in Luwinga, Mzuzu. It is located North of Mzuzu, Northern Region, Malawi. It is a home to a regional team, Nkhorongo United Team, as well as Nkholongo FC.

== Institutions ==
- Nkhorongo Community Garden

Nkhorongo Community Garden was established by local members from Nkhorongo village. The community garden is located in village headman Chikwati in Traditional Authority Kampingo Sibande in Mzimba district. Local crops grown include: peas, maize, “kamuganje” (local spinach), pumpkins, bananas, sugarcane, cherry tomatoes, and okra.

- Tovwilane Elderly Service Centre
- Nkhorongo Community Day Secondary School
