= Chiputula =

Chiputula, Mzuzu
- Location within Malawi
- Coordinates: 10°53′59″S 34°01′00″E
- Country: Malawi
- Region: Northern Region, Malawi
- Municipality: Mzuzu
- Established: 1924

Government
  - Type: Unitary presidential republic

Area
  - Total: 10.00 km^{2} (3.86 sq mi)

Population (2018)
  - Total: 12,529
  - Density: 1,253/km^{2} (3,245/sq mi)

Racial makeup (2018)
  - Black African: 97.2%
  - Asian: 1.9%
  - White Malawian: 1.9%

First languages (2018)
  - Tumbuka: 92.0%
  - Chewa: 1.7%
  - Tonga: 1.1%
  - Other: 3.2%
- Time zone: UTC+2 (CAT)

Chiputula is a populated township in Northern Region, Malawi. It is located inside Mzuzu city. Its neighbourhood include Luwinga, and Katoto.

== Geography ==
Chiputula is located North-East of Mzuzu city.

== History ==
Chiputula got its name from stubborn green grasses that were common in the area.

== Institutions ==
Institutions found in Chiputula include:

- Chiputula C.C.A.P. Church Presbyterian Church
- Chiputula Secondary School
- Chiputula Primary School
