= Moyale (disambiguation) =

Moyale is a city on the border between Ethiopia and Kenya.

Moyale may also refer to:

- Moyale, Mzuzu, a populated township in Northern Region, Malawi
- Moyale, Oromia (woreda), a district in Ethiopia
- Moyale, Somali (woreda), a district in Ethiopia
- Moyale Constituency, an electoral constituency in Kenya
- Moyale District, a former administrative district in Eastern Province, Kenya
