= Jesus Nation Church =

Evangelical Christian denomination

- ECG
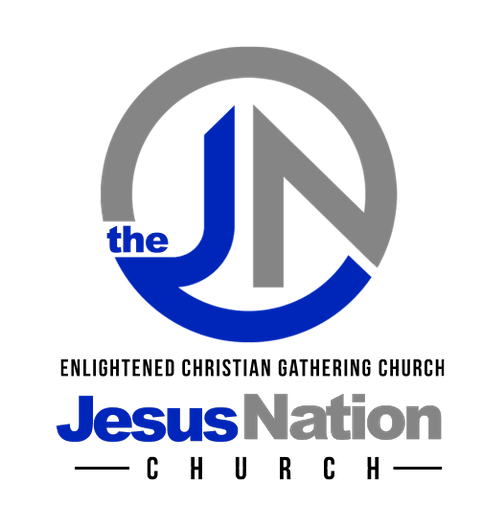
- Address: Chibanja, Mzuzu, Malawi
- Country: Malawi
- Denomination: Christian non-denominational
- Website: ecgchurch.org

History
- Former name: Enlightened Christian Gathering
- Founder: Shepherd Bushiri

The Jesus Nation Church, formerly known simply as the Enlightened Christian Gathering (ECG), is a Christian non-denominational charismatic evangelical church founded by Shepherd Bushiri in Mzuzu, Malawi. The church was established in 2008 and is claimed to lead churches in South Africa, Malawi, Ghana, South Sudan, Zambia, Tanzania and other countries.

The church founder has been interviewed for television by the BBC and received coverage in several news outlets such as Al Jazeera, New African, Nigerian Tribune, and African Leadership magazine.

== History ==
The church was found in early 2008 and was originally headquartered in Mzuzu, Malawi before moving to Lilongwe due to mass audience in 2021. In February 2022, the church founder announced about changing the church name to "Enlightened Christian Gathering, The Jesus Nation Church".

In 2018, The Botswana Gazette reported about shutting down the church in Botswana following the violation of Botswana laws which prohibit the use of miracle money.

== Events ==
The church have attracted over 100,000 viewers via Bushiri's personally owned television station, social media and in-person attendees. The biggest gatherings were held on New Year's Eve at FNB Stadium, South Africa, with over 95,000 attendees in both 2016 and 2017. The FNB Stadium is the largest stadium in Africa.
