= Yombe =

Yombe may refer to:

- Yombe people (Congo and Angola), several groups in southern and central Africa
  - Yombe or Kiyombe (ISO 639-3: yom), a dialect of the Kongo language of western Central Africa spoken by the Yombe people
  - Yombe or Chiyombe, a dialect of the Tumbuka language spoken in Zambia by the Yombe people
  - Yombe maternity figures, sculptural objects that depict the figures of a mother and child
- Léon Yombe (born 1944), Congolese sprinter
- Yombe, a former project of Italian musicians Carola Moccia and Alfredo Maddaluno

== See also ==
- Kiyombe (disambiguation)
- Mayombe, a geographic area on the western coast of Africa
- Yomba, a volcano in Papua New Guinea
