= List of football stadiums in Malawi =

The following is a list of football stadiums in Malawi, ranked by seating capacity. Stadiums in Malawi with a capacity of 10,000 or more are included, even though the list is incomplete.

== Current stadiums ==
Image	Stadium	Capacity	City	Home team	Sport(s)
	Kamuzu Stadium	65,000	Blantyre	National football team	Football
	Bingu National Stadium	41,100	Lilongwe	National football team,	Football
	Civo Stadium	25,000	Lilongwe	National football team,	Football
	Karonga Stadium	20,000	Karonga	Used for club football cup and play-off finals.	National football team
	Silver Stadium	20,000	Lilongwe	Used for club football cup and play-off finals.	National football team
	Mzuzu Stadium	15,000	Mzuzu	National football team	Cricket, Rugby league & Speedway, Football

== See also ==
- Lists of stadiums
