= Katoto, Mzuzu =

Place in Mzuzu, Malawi

- Location within Malawi
- Coordinates: 11°27′43″S 34°00′43″E
- Country: Malawi
- Region: Northern Region, Malawi
- Municipality: Mzuzu
- Established: 1960

Area
  - Total: 46.00 km^{2} (17.76 sq mi)

Population (2018)
  - Total: 299,829
  - Density: 6,518/km^{2} (16,880/sq mi)

Racial makeup (2018)
  - Black African: 90.1%
  - Asian: 4.6%
  - White: 3.3%

First languages (2018)
  - Tumbuka: 90.0%
  - Chewa: 5.0%
  - Tonga: 4.0%
  - Other: 1.0%
- Time zone: UTC+2 (CAT)

You

Katoto is a residential town south of Mzuzu in the Northern Region of Malawi.
