= Mzuzu Coffee Planters Cooperative Union Limited =

Coffee company in Malawi

Mzuzu Coffee Planters Cooperative Union Limited is the only coffee company that produces international standard coffee in Malawi that operates in Northern Region of Malawi. It is located in Luwinga town and the company was established on 1 April 2007. Before it became the union, it operated as Smallholder Coffee Authority from 1979 to 1999 and as Smallholder Coffee Farmers Trust from 1999 to 2007 when coffee sector was liberalized in Malawi. In 2006 under a large European-Union influence project, the cooperative expanded and built many of its 61 CPUs (Centralized Processing Units/Washing Stations) and a centralized dry mill in Mzuzu town for hulling, processing, and export.

The company has approximately 2,600 smallholder farmers that are organized into 5 different cooperatives across north and central Malawi: Misuku hills in Chitipa district, Viphya North in Rumphi, Nkhatabay Highlands, SouthEast Mzimba, and Ntchisi East.

Mzuzu Coffee also has several other businesses, including roasted coffee for local and regional consumption, as well as a coffee shop, a cooperative-owned coffee Estate called Usingini, and tea and honey production.
