= ZZU =

ZZU may refer to:

- Mzuzu Airport (IATA airport code ZZU), an airport serving Mzuzu, Northern Region, Republic of Malawi
- Zhengzhou University (ZZU), a public university in Zhengzhou, He'nan, China
