= Shepherd Bushiri =

Christian charismatic evangelical preacher from Malawi

- Founder and President of Jesus Nation Church
- Church: Jesus Nation Church (formerly Enlightened Christian Gathering)

Personal details
- Born: February 20, 1983 (age 43) Mzuzu, Malawi
- Denomination: Christianity
- Residence: Lilongwe, Malawi
- Spouse: Mary Bushiri
- Children: 2
- Occupation: Prophet, businessman, author
- Education: University of Lilongwe; Therapon University; Alison University; East London University

Shepherd Bushiri (20 February 1983) also known as Major 1 is a Malawian prophet, businessman and author, best known as the founder and leader of the Enlightened Christian Gathering (ECG) (now called The Jesus Nation). In 2024, he received the Global Visionary and Pioneer in Smart City Transformation award at the Burj CEO Awards for the Goshen City project. He is also the owner of Goshen City Dedza Dynamos football club which plays at regional level in Malawi. In 2018, he was given the prestigious award and induction into the CEO Hall of Fame by the African Leadership magazine.

His church, the Jesus Nation Church, started in 2010 in Chibavi, Mzuzu and in 2012, it had branches in several African countries having membership across 72 countries on six continents.

== Background ==
=== Early life ===
Sherpherd Bushiri was born on 20 February 1983 to Christina Huxley, a Tumbuka from Rumphi District and Huxley Bushiri, a Ngoni from Ntcheu District. He attended Moyale Secondary School in Mzuzu before he enrolled at University of Lilongwe where he got his bachelor's degree.

=== Education ===
Bushiri attended his secondary school at Moyale Secondary School in Mzuzu before he enrolled at University of Lilongwe where he obtained his Bachelor's Degree. He also went to Alison University where he obtained a Diploma in Business Administration and Communication, Harvard Business School where he studied Leadership and Business Strategy. He did his Theology, Ministry and Leadership Studies at Therapon University and also went to East London University where he obtained a Master's Degree in Business Adminmistration and Advanced Coroprate Management. He did his Honorary Doctorate in Business Administration and Humanitarian Service at Exploits University in Malawi. He also holds a Honorary Doctorate in Leadership and Philanthropy from Myles Leadership University from India.

== Career ==
=== Ministry work ===
==== Enlightened Christian Gathering ====
Bushiri founded the Enlightened Christian Gathering (ECG) Church (now Jesus Nation) in 2010 in Mzuzu. After a year, the ECG headquarters moved to Lilongwe, the capital of Malawi due to public demand. In 2012, Bushiri had opened ECG branches across the region including in the neighbouring Zambia, Tanzania, Botswana, and later South Africa.

===== Relocation and expansion =====
In 2015, Bushiri moved ECG’s main base to Pretoria in South Africa, to accommodate much larger gatherings. He then later returned the headquarters to Lilongwe in early 2021. Over the 2015–2020 period, ECG’s services in Pretoria drew tens of thousands of attendees. The church sources claim annual events at Johannesburg’s FNB Stadium set attendance records each year from 2015 through 2019.

By late 2020 the ECG/Jesus Nation movement reportedly had active branches in more than 70 countries worldwide. The church runs an “International Visitors’ Programme” (IVP) designed to attract foreign pilgrims; each IVP session typically draws on the order of 3,000 visitors from abroad. A Bushiri sermon from 2020 noted that the online ECG network had millions of followers worldwide.

==== Digital ministry ====
During the COVID-19 pandemic ECG launched major online broadcasting initiatives that enabled global participation. It was reported that in April 2020, some 6–7 million people joined an ECG online service. The efforts were used to broadcast services and solicit donations for relief efforts. His annual conventions attracted massive crowds and internationally, ECG/Ecumenical healing crusades under Bushiri’s banner were held in countries from Kenya to India, mostly publicized as miracles conferences.

==== Moving back to Malawi ====
In January 2021, after several years in South Africa, Bushiri moved his church headquarters back to Lilongwe, Malawi. He cited the need to invest in Malawi’s development. The church continues to hold services and conferences in both Malawi and other countries, and Bushiri maintains global travel schedule preaching worldwide.

=== Author ===
Bushiri is also a prolific Christian author. According to some sources, he has published more than 15 books on faith and prophecy. His best-known title is The Jesus Nation, which the church claims has reached over five million readers worldwide. Other books include devotional and prophetic works such as Understanding the Prophetic Eye, Ray of Anointing, and In the Pursuit of Titus. His writings promote Pentecostal themes of healing, anointing, and empowerment of the believer. The church’s site highlights his literary output and large readership as a sign of his influence.

== Business ==
=== Goshen City Project ===
Apart from his ministry, Bushiri heads the Goshen Trust conglomerate, which oversees multiple commercial ventures and development projects. He is the President and Chairman of the group, which includes businesses in agriculture, FMCG goods, media as well as telecommunications. Its flagship initiative is Goshen City, a planned “smart city” development in southern Malawi. Goshen City is a self-sufficient urban complex incorporating residential, industrial, and commercial zones with advanced infrastructure. Reportedly, Goshen City is a multi‐billion-dollar project and in 2024, it won international attention after it received the Global Visionary and Pioneer in Smart City Transformation award at the Burj CEO Awards in Istanbul. Locally, the project has supported sports development including the local Goshen City Dedza Dynamos football club.

== Philanthropy ==
Bushiri is active in charitable work through the Shepherd Bushiri Foundation (SBF), which he chairs. The foundation focus in areas including health, education, disaster relief, and youth empowerment, among others.

=== Disaster relief ===
In 2021, when Cyclone Freddy struck Malawi, Bushiri’s SBF responded by “adopting” affected communities. It was reported that Bushiri adopted around 15 isolated villages, airlifted food and supplies by helicopter, built new homes for displaced families, and helped rebuild washed‐out bridges.

=== Health sector ===
During the COVID-19 pandemic, Bushiri mobilized resources in Malawi and abroad. In April 2020, he announced a K50 million ($50,000 USD) relief drive to procure PPE for Malawian communities. He also pledged support to health centers in Southern Africa as part of the church’s global pandemic relief plans.

In July 2021, Bushiri donated about 14 infusion pumps valued at approximately K10.5 million to Kamuzu Central Hospital to support pediatric healthcare. During the handover, he also announced plans to construct a children's ward at the hospital in memory of his late daughter, Israella. The hospital's director, Dr. Jonathan N'goma, welcomed the donation, stating that the infusion pumps addressed shortage and expressing support for the proposed children's ward project.

=== Education ===
The Bushiri Foundation provides scholarships and school support. In late 2023, the foundation announced tuition assistance grants totaling 9 million MK (around $10,000) for 36 needy students at Malawi University of Business and Applied Sciences. Officials said SBF aims to fund thousands of scholarships across Malawian universities. The foundation also sponsors church-run schools in Malawi and South Africa.

=== Response to the 2026 South Africa repatriation ===
In June 2026, Bushiri announced that he would provide ten buses to assist in the voluntary repatriation of Malawian nationals returning from South Africa. The announcement was made on 16 June 2026 through his official X account as well as Facebook account, where he stated that preparations were underway to deploy the buses as thousands of Malawians sought to leave South Africa ahead of the 30 June deadline following widespread xenophobic violence and the displacement of migrant communities.

Bushiri's announcement came as the number of Malawians requiring assistance continued to rise. Thousands of Malawian nationals had relocated to temporary shelters, including Sherwood Hall in Durban, after being forced to leave informal settlements where they had received threats to vacate. The Malawian government later established a task team in South Africa to register, verify, protect, and process its citizens for repatriation.

The donation of the buses followed an appeal by the Government of Malawi for financial and logistical support to facilitate the repatriation of an estimated 10,000 Malawian nationals stranded in South Africa. The government called on private companies, humanitarian organisations, development partners, and individuals to contribute resources toward the repatriation effort. Bushiri stated that the buses would be used to transport returnees from South Africa to Malawi as part of the wider humanitarian response.

=== Arts and entertainment ===
Bushiri’s philanthropic wing has sponsored cultural events and talent shows. In 2023, SBF helped fund the Malawi Has Talent TV competition (paid K500 million to air a season). He has also supported religious radio/TV productions and youth cultural outreach.

=== Sports development ===
In 2026, Bushiri launched a nationwide football talent initiative. Through Goshen City and SBF partnerships with the Football Association of Malawi, he organized regional tryouts and training clinics. Over K200 million (about $200,000) was invested to scout and develop young players nationwide. He said that Malawian youth need more investment in sports to harness their potential.

== Controversies and legal troubles ==
=== Arrests ===
==== South Africa ====
Bushiri’s career has been marred by ongoing legal controversies. In 2019, he and his wife, Mary Bushiri, were arrested in South Africa by the national crime unit (the Hawks) on allegations of fraud and money laundering. The couple posted bail, but in late 2020 new charges were added, however, the South African courts failed to provide proof and supporting documents against Bushiri.

==== Malawi ====
While on bail in October 2020, the Bushiris left South Africa and returned to Malawi after a series of assassination attempts and extortion spree on their lives. On November 18, 2020, Malawi police arrested them based on an Interpol red notice from South Africa. However, a Malawian court quickly released them unconditionally, ruling the arrest was illegal as the police had not followed proper extradition procedures.

From 2022, the Bushiris cooperated with the laws of Malawi and appeared on all extradition hearings. In March 2025, a Malawian magistrate’s court ordered them extradited to South Africa to face charges. However, in October 2025 Malawi’s High Court overturned that committal order, citing lack of hearing and hearsay evidence.

== Awards and recognitions ==
Bushiri has received numerous honors, including:

- Honorary Doctorate (2016): he was awarded an honorary Doctorate of Humane Letters by Exploits University in Malawi for his humanitarian work.
- African Leadership CEO Hall of Fame (2018): he was named to the African Leadership Magazine’s CEO Hall of Fame.
- Great Samaritan Award (2023): he received Malawi’s national Great Samaritan Award for his philanthropic efforts.
- Smart City Pioneer (2024): the Burj CEO Awards (Istanbul) honored him as “Global Visionary and Pioneer in Smart City Transformation” for Goshen City.

== Personal life ==
Bushiri is married to Mary Bushiri, who is also a co-pastor in ECG. They had two daughters but in 2021, their elder daughter Israella fell ill and was reportedly blocked from leaving Malawi for treatment and eventually died in a Kenyan hospital on March 29, 2021. They now have one child, Raphaella.
