= Tumbuka tonology =

Tone system of the Tumbuka language

Like most other Niger–Congo languages, the Tumbuka language is a tonal language with two basic surface tones: high (H) and low (L). Tumbuka grammatical tone is moderately complex and displays several productive sandhi processes, including tone spreading, tone lowering, and the docking of “floating” tones from certain morphemes.

Although Tumbuka tone is less complex than that of some neighbouring languages (for example, Ngoni and certain Bemba dialects), it exhibits a characteristic split between lexical tone (in roots and nouns) and grammatical tone (introduced by verbal morphology, relative markers, and focus constructions). Unlike many Nguni languages, Tumbuka lacks depressor consonants and therefore has no depressor-induced tone raising or delayed high tone: tonal operations occur primarily on the basis of the underlying tone class of morphemes.

The tone of a Tumbuka syllable is borne by the vowel and, in rare cases, the syllabic nasal [n̩] when it occurs word-initially before voiceless consonants.

== Tonology overview ==
Chewa and Tumbuka are both Bantu languages (N31 and N21 respectively) spoken in Malawi. However, the two languages have distinct prosodic systems. Chewa has contrastive tone, while Tumbuka has predictable tone; Chewa has only one level of phrasing (Intonational Phrase), while Tumbuka provides evidence for two levels of phrasing: the Phonological Phrase and the Intonational Phrase. Despite these differences, both languages share key intonational features such as penult lengthening and boundary tones used to distinguish declaratives from question types.

=== Tumbuka: predictable tone system ===
In contrast to Chewa, there are no lexical or grammatical tonal contrasts in Tumbuka (except in some ideophones). Instead, the penult of every word in isolation is lengthened, and the first mora of this lengthened penult carries a predictable High tone.

Below are representative examples showing the absence of tonal contrasts in nouns and verbs.

==== No tonal contrasts in nouns ====
Singular	Gloss	Plural
múu-nthu	person	ŵáa-nthu
m-líimi	farmer	ŵa-líimi
m-zíinga	bee hive	mi-zíinga
m-síika	market	mi-síika
khúuni	tree	ma-kúuni
báanja	family	ma-báanja
ci-páaso	fruit	vi-páaso
ci-ndíindi	secret	vi-ndíindi
nyáama	meat, animal	nyáama
mbúuzi	goat	mbúuzi

==== No tonal contrasts in verbs and paradigms ====
Form	Example	Gloss
Infinitive	ku-líima	to farm
Imperative	líima!	farm!
Present	ti-ku-líima	we farm
Present negative	ti-ku-líma yáaye	we do not farm
Remote past	ti-ka-líima	we farmed
Remote past negative	ti-ka-líma yáaye	we did not farm
Recent past	t-angu-líima	we recently farmed
Perf. applicative	n-a-ŵa-limíira	I have farmed for them
Perfect	ŵ-a-líima	they have farmed
Future	wa-zamu-líima	s/he will farm
Future applicative	wa-zamu-limilíira	s/he will weed

== Prosodic phrasing in Tumbuka ==
Tumbuka words display their predictable penult lengthening only when they occur at the right edge of a prosodic phrase. The penult High tone and lengthening typically fall on the final word of each lexical XP.

Representative phrasing examples:

Sentence	Gloss	Notes
(ti-ku-phika síima)	We are cooking porridge.	VP-final penult H
(ŵ-áana) (ŵa-ku-ŵa-vwira ŵa-bwéezi)	The children are helping the friends.	Subject and VP phrased separately
(ti-ka-wona mu-nkhúungu) (ku-msíika)	We saw a thief at the market.	Verb–object as one phrase, PP separate
(ŵ-anakáazi) (ŵa-ka-sona vy-akuvwara vya mu-kwáati)	The women sewed the bride’s clothes.	Standard XP edges
(m-nyamáata) (wa-ka-timba nyúumba) (na líibwe)	The boy hit the house with a rock.	Three prosodic domains

== Phonological and intonational phrases ==
The Phonological Phrase (φ) in Tumbuka aligns with the right edge of lexical XPs. The verb and its first complement usually form a single φ, while additional complements form their own.

The Intonational Phrase (ι) corresponds to larger syntactic constituents such as clause boundaries, topics, clefts, and relative clauses. The penult of the final word in an ι is significantly longer, and the High tone is realised lower than preceding High tones.

Examples of ι-final lengthening and boundary tones:

Structure	Example (Tumbuka)	Gloss
Topic	(bóola) (ŵáana ŵa-ku-yi-tíimba)	As for the ball, the children are kicking it.
Cleft	(Ni ntcheŵe njíi) (iyo yi-ka-luma mu-nkhúungu)	It is which dog that bit the thief?
Relative clause	(ŵ-ana aŵo ŵa-khala mu-khúuni) ŵa-ku-lya ma-kóombwe	The children who are sitting in the tree are eating bananas.

== See also ==
- Tumbuka grammar
- Tone (linguistics)
