= Katawa Singers =

Malawian gospel choir

Katawa CCAP Singers
- Origin: Mzuzu
- Genres: Electronic gospel
- Years active: 1980–Present
- Labels: MBC Chichiri Studios; Malawi Broadcasting Station; 1000HZ Records
- Past members: Auden Nthala; Thomas Lupeska; Eliza Kachali; Grey Mwanza; Andrea Kamanga; Mirriam Mhango; Eliot Msiska; Telita Moyo; Perfect Shawa; Ruth Kachali; Alice Luwinga; Yohane Njunga

Katawa C.C.A.P. Singers is a Malawian choir group that emerged in the early 1980s and rose to fame in the 1990s. It got its name from a township in Mzuzu and the group started during a fundraising initiative that was intended to construct a Presbyterian church in Katawa area in 1990. The initiative was organised by Allen Mtambo and Reverend Peter Mushanga, as well as Pickford Jungu. They started producing electronic gospel music when they received a Yamaha keyboard from donors that were visiting the church then. The group won several awards, including the Malawi Broadcasting Station (MBC) award.

The choir made its first recording in 1992. It also recorded its four initial songs at MBC Chichiri Studios with Auden Nthala, Thomas Lupeska, Eliza Kachali and Yohane Njunga. Some of their notable songs include Ambuye ndi bwera, Welawelako, Yesu Wali Kwiza and Uyimilire Nga Nga Nga. The group released its first album at Baptist Media Centre in Blantyre in early 1992. Their song Ambuye ndibwera (Lord is coming) which was done in Chichewa language made grand sales amounting up to 20 000 tapes. In 1993, they released another studio album titled Chikondi Ndi Chanu (Love is Yours), which came with songs such as Ayehova Tawonani (Jehovah see), Kolesykani (Keep on holding), and I have Wandered. The group later recorded its third album in 1994, which has songs such as Nyumba Yawadada, Likunozga Dzuwa and Nthawi Inatha which sold over 40,000 tapes in northern region. In 1995, the band recorded Ku Eden album.

In 2023, the band revealed plans about going back to the studio to re-record their old songs.

== Selected studio albums ==
Wedding Special (1991)

Ambuye ndibwera vol. 2 (1992)

Chikondi Chanu vol. 3 (1993)

Mtamikani vol. 4 (1994)

Ku Edeni vol. 5 (1995)

Timbire Yesu vol. 6 (1996)

Tidziganizile vol. 7 (1997)

=== Ufulu (compilation 1991-1997) (1000Hz Records) ===
- Ufulu
- Zokoma za Mdziko
- Mwadzi Wanu
- Tikudza Kwanu
- Tadzipereka
- Wela-welako
- Kum-ba-yah
- Nthawi Ilikutha
- Tikauwone
- Woza Moya
- Misozi

=== Katula (compilation 1998 - 2023) (1000Hz Records) ===
- Yesu Mfumu Yamayankho (He Is the Answer)
- Katula
- Kuli Yaweh (There Is God in Heaven)
- Wankhondo Wa Mphinjika
- Wakamunyoza Yesu (He Was Tortured to Save Me from My Sins)
- Ochimwa Adzalira
