= Kiyombe =

Kiyombe can refer to:

- Kiyombe language (ISO 639-3: yom), a dialect of the Kongo language of western Central Africa spoken by the Yombe people
- Kiyombe, Rwanda, a sector (imirenge) of Nyagatare District, Rwanda

== See also ==
- Yombe (disambiguation)
