= Tusayiwe Mkhondya =

Malawian school founder

Tusaiwe Munkhondya
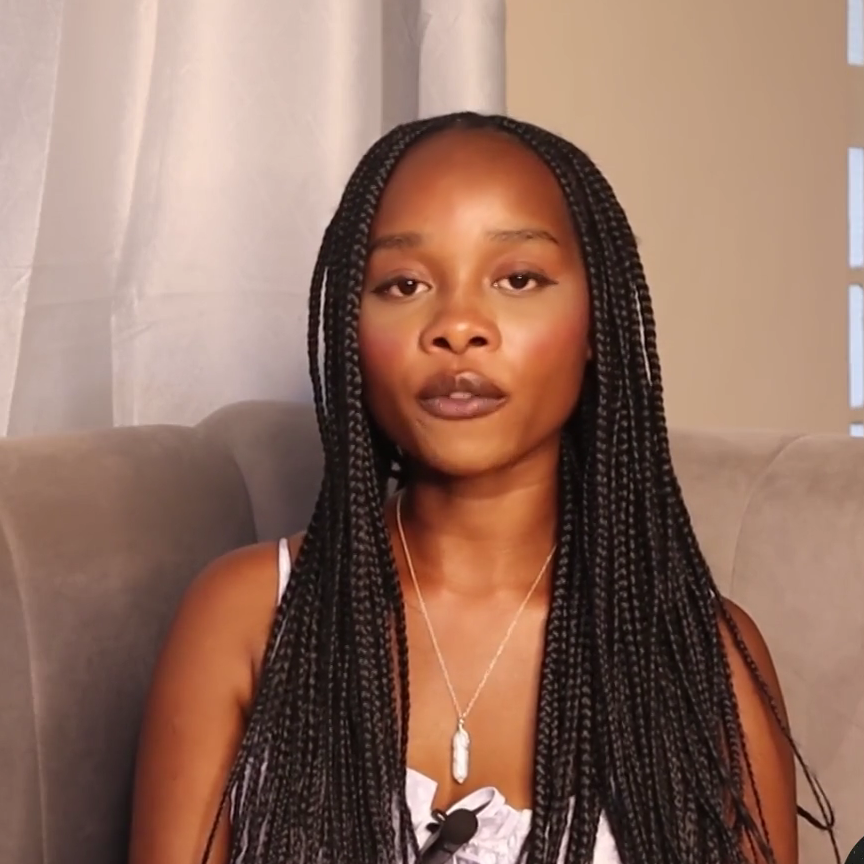
- 2025 photo
- Born: 9 March 1999 (age 27)
- Known for: creating schools and an orphanage
- Children: Jeromy
- Website: tusaiweyana.com

Tusaiwe Munkhondya or Tusayiwe Mkhondya (born 9 March 1999) is a Malawian school, orphanage and organisation founder. She had adopted over thirty children and created two organisations which support young mothers, their children, an orphanage and three schools near Mzuzu in northern Malawi.

== Life ==
Mkhondya is from Mzuzu and she was born on 9 March 1999. She was adopted by her grandmother when she was young as her mother abandoned her. Her son, Jeromy, was born when she was sixteen and she only found out that he was autistic following surgery that tried to fix his inability to speak. She and Jeromy had a difficult time and when she was eighteen she was homeless. Her first enterprise was to create an organisation called "Empowering Young Mothers" which supported young teenage mothers like herself. She and the organisation started a pre-school and this led to another idea. One of the mother's died leaving a five year old and Mkhondya started to care for the child. This was an adoption and she was aware that this should require some administration so she informed the Ministry of Gender, Children, Disability and Social Welfare. The ministry responded and that was the start of an on-going supportive relationship. Over the years the organisation (i.e. her) has adopted over 30 children.

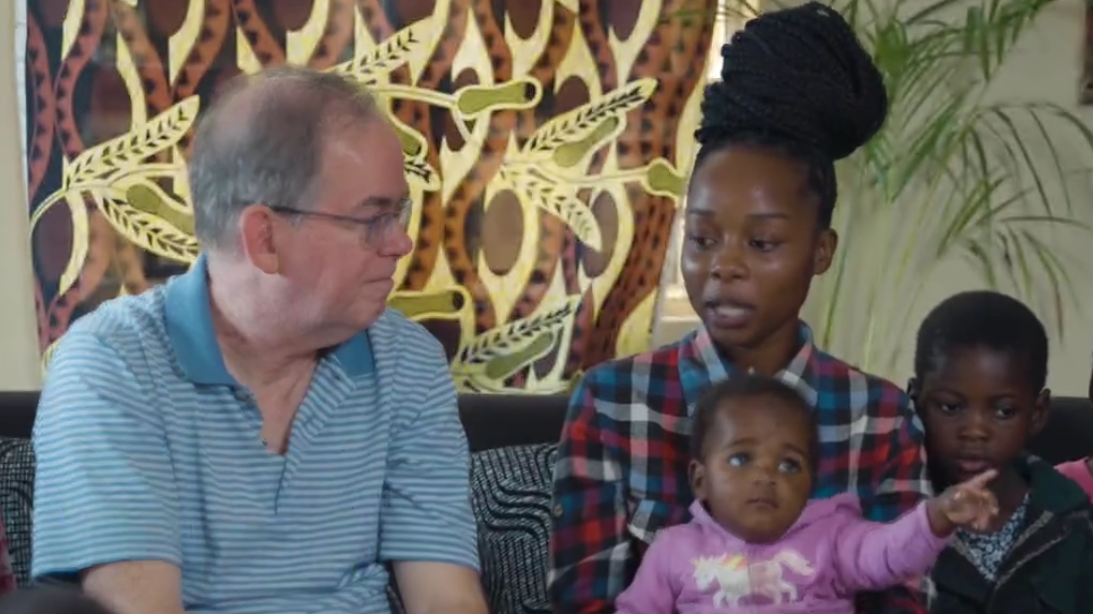
US Ambassador David Young visiting her in Mzeze in 2023

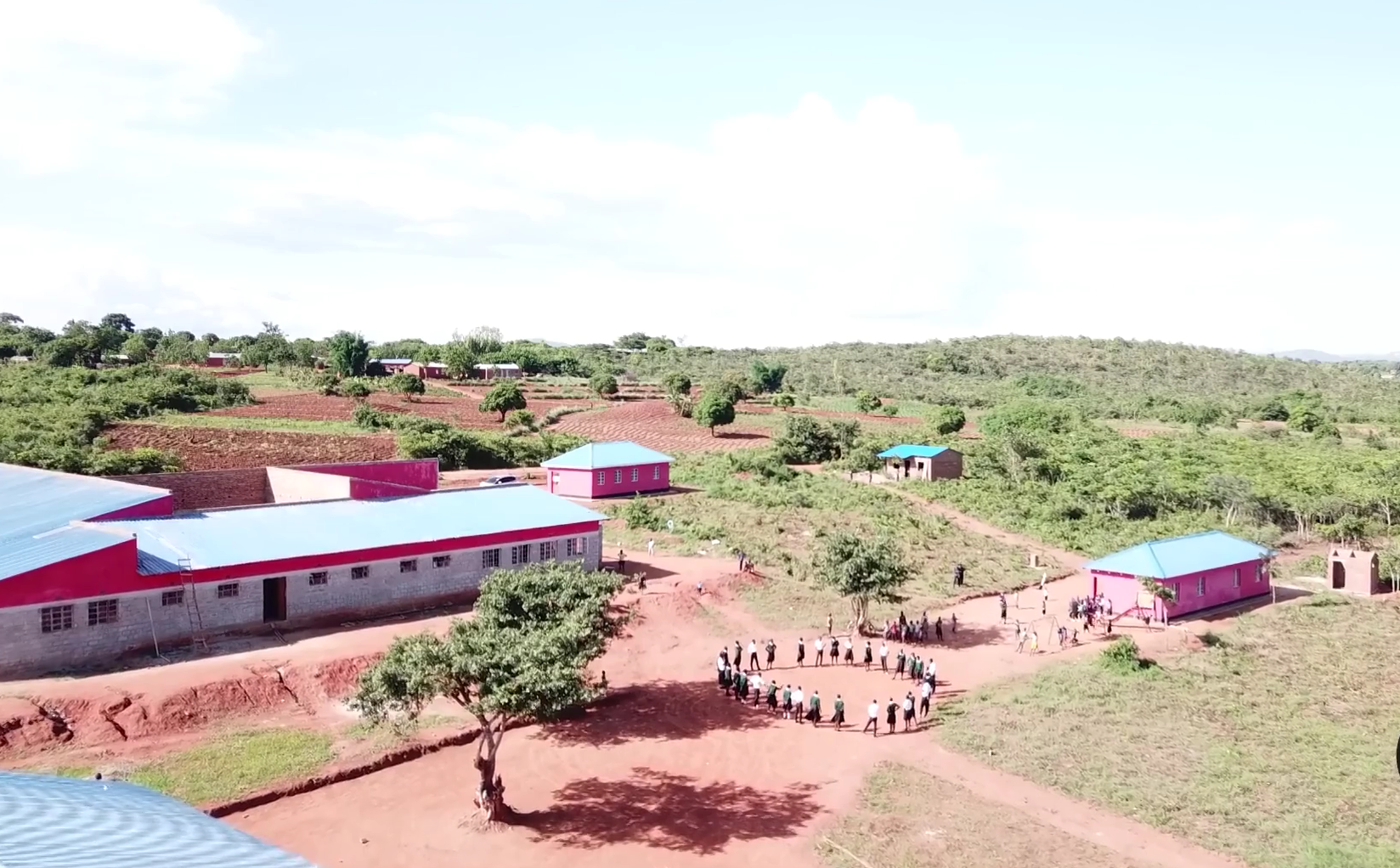
Voice of America photo of her community in January 2025

She realised that her son was being mistreated at school and she decided to open her own school. It started with ten pre-school children in a chicken shed. She began to foster other children and the facility grew.

You Are Not Alone (YANA) is a foundation she founded in 2021 in Dunduzu which is a residential town on the outskirts of Mzuzu. In 2022 the organisation employed less than twenty people and they organise an orphanage, two schools, a special education school and a pre-school. Mkhondya estimates that they care for 200 children. She has not been able to obtain funding from the government so YANA is funded by charities, companies and individuals. There are 25 children who live in the orphanage. In 2022 it was estimated that her organisations had helped 6,000 people.

She was celebrated on the US Embassy in Lilongwe's Facebook page in November 2021. In May 2023 she told the US ambassador David Young that she had about 90 children when he visited. She was identified by Avance Media as one of their 100 Most Influential African Women for 2023.

In January 2025 she was the main focus of a Voice of America profile that also included Emma Kaliya of the Malawi Human Rights Resource Centre in Lilongwe.
