= Mzuzu Academy =

Mzuzu International Academy is an internationally accredited secondary school with deep roots in the community of Mzuzu. It is located just outside the city of Mzuzu, Malawi. Mzuzu International Academy is a private coeducational day school and boarding school (Year 7 upwards) for students aged 4 to 16, Reception to Year 11.

== History ==
Mzuzu International Academy was founded on the late evening of January 16, 2003 at Mr. and Mrs. Don Banda's place in the City of Kirkland, Washington State, USA, by four Malawians: Don Banda, Victor Mhoni, Anna Msowaya-Keys and Jaster Nyasulu. At that meeting with brainstorming as their agenda, the four discussed about the school plans and fundraising activities. By May, 2003, the group had increased to ten. The new members to the board were Frazier Nyasulu, MacMillan Dalla, Sophie Nyasulu, Sheila Mkandawire, Alexander Mkandawire and Selina Mkandawire.

Mzuzu International Academy opened in September 2010 and currently, April 2017, has a school population of 200 students aged from 4–16; including 60 boarders. Approximately 25% of the Senior School population, Years 7–11, are scholarship students drawn from disadvantaged families in the local area.

== Curriculum ==
The school follows the English National Curriculum, adapted to incorporate an international perspective, which leads to the University of Cambridge's International General Certificate of Secondary Education (IGCSE) at the Ordinary Level in Form 5 (Year 11).

The courses provide broad programs of study covering the usual secondary school subjects.
