= Holmfirth High School =

Community school in Thongsbridge, Holmfirth, West Yorkshire, England

Location
- Heys Road; Thongsbridge, Holmfirth, West Yorkshire, HD9 7SE; England
- Coordinates: 53.5830°N 1.7719°W

Information
- Type: Community school
- Established: 1959
- Local authority: Kirklees
- Specialist: Maths, computing, Special Educational Needs
- Department for Education URN: 107769 Tables
- Ofsted: Reports
- Headteacher: Benjamin Stitchman
- Gender: Coeducational
- Age: 11 to 16
- Houses: Wainwright, Barson, Taylor & Paxman
- Colours: Red (Barson), Blue (Paxman), Green (Taylor), Yellow (Wainwright), White, Black
- Website: http://holmfirthhigh.co.uk/

Holmfirth High School is a coeducational secondary school located on Heys Road in Thongsbridge, Holmfirth, West Yorkshire, England.

Holmfirth High School opened in 1959, and currently has over 1,300 pupils, split over five-year groups from years 7 to 11, covering the age range of 11 to 16 years. The current head is Mr. Ben Stitchman, who was appointed in September 2018. Based on the initial inspection by Ofsted in 2001 the school is situated in Holmfirth, a small town south of Huddersfield, on a pleasant rural site, in an area containing a mixture of types of housing and a wide socio-economic mix. The school takes pupils from a wide area. Pupils transfer from approximately nine primary schools, many travelling several miles.

At that time, more than 99.5 per cent of pupils were white with only three pupils with English as an additional language but none is in the early stage of learning English. About nine per cent of pupils were entitled to free school meals, a figure that is below the national average. The attainment of pupils coming to the school was comprehensive and a little above average.

== Ofsted Inspections ==
In 2017 Holmfirth received a rating of "Good" across all categories by Ofsted. Ofsted stated that "Leaders have established a positive ethos that addresses the academic needs of pupils and promotes their wider personal and social development." In addition Ofsted elaborated with noting how the "school works effectively with other schools to lead the sharing of good practice." Room for improvement is possible though as Ofsted states "Despite recent improvements, disadvantaged pupils remain more likely to be absent than their peers and make slower progress." Ofsted

The ratings of the school have been at standards of Good and above for the past 3 inspections by Ofsted

== Twinning ==
In 2017 a teacher visiting Malawi found a school that Holmfirth could twin with. Lupaso Community Day Secondary School in Mzuzu was chosen and this led to pupils and staff visiting. Funds raised by 2019 allowed improvements to the schools infrastructure. The school near Mzuzu had about 250 pupils and some walked for over an hour to be there at 7:30 each school day.

== Performance ==
Holmfirth High School ranks (2019) as a top five school in Kirklees in terms of progress 8, attainment 8 and grade 5 or above in English and Maths GCSEs.

=== Progress 8 Score ===
This score shows how much progress pupils at Holmfirth High School made between the end of key stage 2 and the end of key stage 4, compared to pupils across England who got similar results at the end of key stage 2. This is based on results in up to 8 qualifications, which include English, maths, 3 English Baccalaureate qualifications including sciences, computer science, history, geography and languages, and 3 other additional approved qualifications.

A score above zero means pupils made more progress, on average, than pupils across England who got similar results at the end of key stage 2.

A score below zero means pupils made less progress, on average, than pupils across England who got similar results at the end of key stage 2.

A negative progress score does not mean pupils made no progress, or the school has failed, rather it means pupils in the school made less progress than other pupils across England with similar results at the end of key stage 2.

- 2019 +0.25 (Above Average – Achieved by about 18% of schools in England)
- 2018 +0.11 (Average – Achieved by about 37% of schools in England)
- 2017 +0.01 (Average – Achieved by about 37% of schools in England)

Current (2019) Rankings

Kirklees: 5th out of 50 schools

=== Attainment 8 Score ===
Schools get a score based on how well pupils have performed in up to 8 qualifications, which include English, maths, 3 English Baccalaureate qualifications including sciences, computer science, history, geography and languages, and 3 other additional approved qualifications.

- 2019 – School 53.9 Points – Local Authority Average 45.1 Points – England Average 46.6 Points
- 2018 – School 53.7 Points – Local Authority Average 45.4 Points – England Average 46.5 Points
- 2017 – School 51 Points – Local Authority Average 45 Points – England Average 44.2 Points

Current (2019) Rankings

Kirklees: 3rd out of 50 schools

=== Grade 5 or above in English & maths GCSEs ===
This tells you the percentage of pupils who achieved grade 5 or above in the reformed English and maths GCSEs. Reformed GCSEs are graded 1 (low) to 9 (high). Grade 5 in the new grading is a similar level of achievement to a high grade C or low grade B in the old grading.

- 2019 – School 58% – Local Authority Average 42.4% – England Average 43%
- 2018 – School 61% – Local Authority Average 42.5% – England Average 43.3%
- 2017 – School 58%

Current (2019) Rankings

Kirklees: 4th out of 50 schools

== Notable former pupils ==
- Jessica Gunning, actress (Pride, The Outlaws, Baby Reindeer)
- Anita Carey, actress
