= Yombe dialect (Zambia) =

Tumbuka dialect of Zambia

Yombe
- Chiyombe
- Native to: Zambia
- Region: Muchinga Province
- Ethnicity: Tumbuka people of Zambia
- Native speakers: (6,900 cited 1999 census)
- Language family: Niger–Congo?: Atlantic–Congo; Benue–Congo; Bantoid; Bantu; Tumbuka; Yombe

Language codes
- ISO 639-3: None (mis)
- Glottolog: yomb1245

Yombe is a Tumbuka language spoken by the Yombe people of Zambia, a group that is part of the Tumbuka family of the Bantu people, within the Sub-Saharan African affinity branch. They speak Tumbuka as their primary language, with a number of speakers in Zambia of over 11,700. Their dialect slightly differs from the Senga dialect of Tumbuka which is also spoken in the country.
