= Mzuzu Central Hospital =

Malawian public referral hospital

- Location of Mzuzu

Geography
- Location: Mzuzu, Malawi
- Coordinates: 11°25′41″S 33°59′45″E

Organisation
- Care system: Public
- Type: District General, Teaching
- Affiliated university: University of North Carolina; University of Malawi

Services
- Emergency department: Yes
- Beds: 610

Helipads
- Helipad: No

History
- Founded: 1945; 81 years ago

Links
- Other links: List of hospitals in Malawi

Mzuzu Central Hospital is a tertiary referral hospital in Mzuzu city, Malawi. The facility was found in early 1945 and is estimated to have 610 beds. It serves nearly 3 million people, referred from several hospitals in the Northern Malawi districts, as well as from other parts of Malawi. The hospital also receives patients from several neighboring countries, mostly Zambia and Tanzania.

== Location ==
The hospital is located in Luwinga found in Mzuzu city in the Mzimba district.

== Overview ==
As a public hospital, it serves as the main referral hospital for the Northern and Central Regions of Malawi. It also provides health services to the local community. It has several ranges of health care services, including inpatient and outpatient, as well as emergency care. It furthermore provides radiology, laboratory and child health services to all patients. The hospital also has specialized clinics for each specialised patient. The hospital implements a comprehensive quality assurance system that is well monitored and reviewed regularly to make sure that high-quality standards are being maintained.

The hospital provides both inpatient and outpatient medical services and has extensive specialised departments. It includes obstetrics and gynecology, intensive care, surgery and laboratory services, as well as radiology. It is also provides training to students in health treatments by experienced medical staff and supervisors from the College of Medicine at the University of Malawi.

== History ==
The hospital was built in 1945 by European Missionaries who visited the region. It was originally called Mzuzu European Hospital in the 1940s, with an intention to provide medical health care for European traders and explorers in the area. In 1955, the hospital was handed over to colonial powers and was renamed Mzuzu Hospital. The hospital's name was extended to its current name in 1975 following the nation's independence in 1964. Currently, it serves as a national referral health center in Malawi for the Northern Region of Malawi, as well as the surrounding districts.

Apart from serving as a major healthcare provider in the Northern Region, the hospital is also known for training and building the capacity of healthcare workers from around the country.

In 2023, the hospital reported several ongoing Covid-19 cases.

== Collaboration and partnerships ==
Mzuzu Central Hospital has a partnership with the University of Malawi.

== See also ==
- List of hospitals in Malawi
