= Tumbuka grammar =

Grammar of the Tumbuka language

Tumbuka grammar describes the main grammatical features of the Tumbuka language (Tumbuka: ChiTumbuka), a Bantu language spoken primarily in Malawi, Zambia and Tanzania. The Tumbuka grammar is typical for Bantu languages, bearing all the hallmarks of this language family. These include agglutinativity, extensive inflection for person (both subject and object), a rich array of noun classes, tense and aspect, as well as a subject–verb–object word order.

== Noun classification and concord ==
Tumbuka, like other Bantu languages, has a system of noun classes that govern agreement (concord) on adjectives, verbs, pronouns, and other modifiers. Nouns take prefixes such as m-, ma-, ci-, and vi-, and modifiers agree with the noun’s class. Pluralisation usually involves changing the noun prefix: for instance, class 1 singular m- pluralises to ŵa-, and class 7 ci- to class 8 vi-.

== Pronouns and subject marking ==
Personal pronouns can be expressed but are often omitted, since the verb carries a subject-prefix agreeing with the subject noun or pronoun.

- ine n-kha-gula – “I bought” (1st sg prefix n-kha-).

The 3rd person singular prefix may appear as a- in some dialects rather than wa-.

== Verbal morphology ==
Every finite verb in Tumbuka carries a subject prefix, sometimes an object marker, and a tense–aspect marker.

=== Subject prefix ===
Each verb takes a prefix marking the subject’s noun class or person, e.g., ciŵinda ci-ka-koma nkhalamu (“the hunter killed a lion”).

=== Object marker ===
An optional object marker precedes the verb root and agrees with the object’s noun class, e.g. Pokani wa(yi)gula galimoto (“Pokani has bought a car”).

=== Tense and aspect ===
Tumbuka expresses tense and aspect through verbal affixes rather than tone.

Tense	Marker	Example	Translation
Present infinitive	ku-	ku-luta	“to go”
Present simple	-ku-	wa-ku-luta	“he/she goes” or “is going”
Present perfect	-a-	w-a-luta	“he/she has gone”
Remote past	-ka-	wa-ka-luta	“he/she went (some time ago)”
Near future	-enge	wa-luta-enge	“he/she will go (today)”
Remote future continuous	-zamu-…-anga	wa-zamu-luta-anga	“he/she will be going (tomorrow or later)”

=== Negation ===
Negation is expressed by particles such as yayi or chara, typically following the verb:

- wakulemba kalata yayi – “he is not writing a letter”.

A special negative perfect form adds -nda-…-e:

- yayi, nindakumana nawo – “no, I haven’t met him”.

== Syntax ==
The basic word order is subject–verb–object (SVO), although variation occurs for focus or topicalisation. Verbs, adjectives, and relative clauses agree with their head nouns in noun class. Compound tenses and auxiliary constructions also occur, e.g., wakaŵa kuti wafumapo (“he had just left”).

== Phonology and prosody ==
Although primarily a grammatical description, prosody interacts with morphosyntax. Studies show that Tumbuka lacks lexical tone contrasts; instead, a phrasal high-tone (stress-like) system applies. The penultimate vowel is lengthened and bears high tone in isolation.

== Orthography ==
Tumbuka uses a Latin-based alphabet. Its orthography was standardised in the early 1940s in Malawi.

== Examples ==
- ciŵinda ci-ka-koma nkhalamu — “the hunter killed a lion”
- wa-ku-luta — “he/she is going”
- wa-luta-enge — “he/she will go”

== Dialectal variation ==
The 3rd person singular prefix may be a- instead of wa- in the Karonga dialect; the plural may appear as wa- rather than ŵa-.

== See also ==
- Tumbuka language
