= Mzuzu Stadium =

Football stadium in Mzuzu, Malawi

Coordinates: 11.45807°S 34.015131°E

- Interactive map of Mzuzu Stadium
- Location: Mzuzu, Malawi
- Owner: Government of Malawi
- Operator: Mzuzu City council
- Capacity: 15, 000 (regulated capacity); 14,000 (seated capacity)
- Surface: GrassMaster
- Field size: 30 by 20 metres (32.8 yd × 21.9 yd)

Construction
- Groundbreaking: 12 February 1970; 56 years ago
- Built: 12 February 1967 – 15 July 1970
- Opened: 3 March 1970; 56 years ago
- Renovated: 2000–2007, 2023
- Cost: 4 Billion Malawi Kwacha
- Architect: Populous
- Project manager: Mzuzu mayor

Tenants
- Nyasa Big Bullets FC; Mighty Wanderers FC; Malawi national football team (until 2017); Moyale Barracks (2019–present)

Mzuzu Stadium is a multi-use stadium in Mzuzu, Malawi. The stadium is mostly for football matches, on club level by Moyale Barracks FC of the Super League of Malawi and other various sport activities. The stadium has a capacity of 10,000 spectators.

== Background ==
The Mzuzu Stadium was built in 1970 using prison labor. The stadium has a capacity of 15,000 and is the only stadium in the city of Mzuzu built using prison labor.

== Incidents ==
In August of 2023, The Football Association of Malawi (FAM) banned the Mzuzu Stadium as well as Civo Stadium of Lilongwe over the poor state of the stadiums' pitch and the bad conditions of the players’ tunnel. The FAM also banned the stadiums due to missing of technical benches and bad condition of the perimeter fence, as well as poor state of dressing rooms, including lack of public address system and poor condition of scoreboard. This was as the result of an inspection carried out by the FAM's Club Licensing department.

== See also ==
- List of Malawian Stadiums
