= Mzuzu Airport =

Airport in Malawi

- IATA: ZZU; ICAO: FWUU

Summary
- Airport type: Public
- Operator: Government
- Serves: Mzuzu, Malawi
- Elevation AMSL: 4,115 ft (1,254 m)
- Coordinates: 11°26′41″S 034°00′42″E

Map
- Location of airport in Malawi

Runways
Direction	Length		Surface
Direction	m	ft	Surface
17/35	1,600	5,250	Bitumen
- Source: DAFIF

Mzuzu Airport (IATA: ZZU, ICAO: FWUU) is an airport serving Mzuzu, the capital city of the Northern Region of the Republic of Malawi.

== Facilities ==
The airport resides at an elevation of 4,115 feet (1,254 m) above mean sea level. It has one runway designated 17/35 with a bitumen surface measuring 1,600 by 19 metres (5,249 ft × 62 ft).

== Accidents and incidents ==
On 10 June, 2024, a plane carrying the vice president of Malawi, Saulos Chilima, attempted to land in Mzuzu from Lilongwe. It turned back due to poor visibility and later crashed, killing all onboard.
