= Luwinga, Mzuzu =

Town in Mzimba District, Malawi

Luwinga
- Location within Malawi
- Coordinates: 11°00′00″S 33°30′50″E
- Country: Malawi
- Region: Northern Region, Malawi
- Municipality: Mzimba District
- Established: 1960

Area
  - Total: 19.14 km^{2} (7.39 sq mi)

Population (2018)
  - Total: 11,727
  - Density: 612.7/km^{2} (1,587/sq mi)

Racial makeup (2018)
  - Black African: 95.2%
  - Asian: 4.8%
  - White Malawians: 1.0%
  - Other: 0.2%

First languages (2018)
  - Chitumbuka: 97.8%
  - Nkhonde: 1.1%
  - Other: 2.1%
- Time zone: UTC+2
- Postal code: 4000
- Post-office box: 4440

Luwinga is a town north of Mzuzu city in Mzimba District, Malawi and forms part of the Mzuzu municipality. Institutions found in Luwinga include the third biggest referral hospital in Malawi, Mzuzu Central Hospital, and a regional university, Mzuzu University.

== History ==
=== Establishment ===
Luwinga was established as a trading post by the British colonial administration in the early 1880s. The town grew rapidly that by the 1970s, it had become a major commercial center in the region. The town's strategic location made it an important hub for trade and commerce, and it quickly became a center for agricultural production, particularly coffee and cotton.

=== Location ===
Luwinga is located in the Mzimba district of Malawi, in the northern region of the country. It is situated approximately 20 kilometers north of the city of Mzuzu, and about 10 kilometers south of the town of Ekwendeni.

=== Latitudes and longitudes ===
Luwinga is located at latitudes 11.00° S and longitudes 33.30° E.

== Institutions ==
Luwinga is home to several institutions, including:

- Luwinga Primary School: a primary school providing education to local children
- Luwinga Clinic: a healthcare facility offering medical services to the local population
- Luwinga Market: a bustling market where locals sell fresh produce, crafts, and other goods
- Luwinga Post Office: a post office providing postal services to the local community

=== Tourist places ===
- Luwinga Viewpoint: a scenic viewpoint offering stunning views of the surrounding countryside
- Luwinga Cultural Village: a cultural village showcasing the traditional way of life of the Tumbuka people

== Recreational centers ==
- Luwinga Sports Ground: a sports ground hosting various sports and recreational activities
- Luwinga Community Center: a community center offering various recreational activities and events

=== Rivers and Streams ===
- Lunyangwa River: a river flowing through the town and surrounding countryside
- Viyere River: a stream flowing through the town and surrounding countryside

=== Other notable features ===
- Luwinga Forest Reserve: a forest reserve located just outside the town, offering opportunities for hiking and wildlife viewing
- Luwinga Tea Estate: a tea estate located just outside the town, offering opportunities for tea tasting and tours

== Suburbs ==
Luwinga is divided into many suburbs. Some of the notable suburbs include:

- St. Augustine
- Viyele
- Area1B (industrial)
- Kang'ona (residential)
- Nkhorongo (residential)
- Homebound (residential)
- Dunduzu (residential)

== Universities and colleges ==
- Mzuzu University
- Luwinga Technical Centre
- Matipula College
- Mzuzu International Academy

== Industry ==
Luwinga is one of the smaller industrial nodes of Mzuzu city and although many industries are scattered around the town. Notable industries that operate from Luwinga include:

- Kentam Products Limited
- Universal Industries
- Mzuzu Coffee
