= Mzuzu =

Capital of Malawi's Northern Region

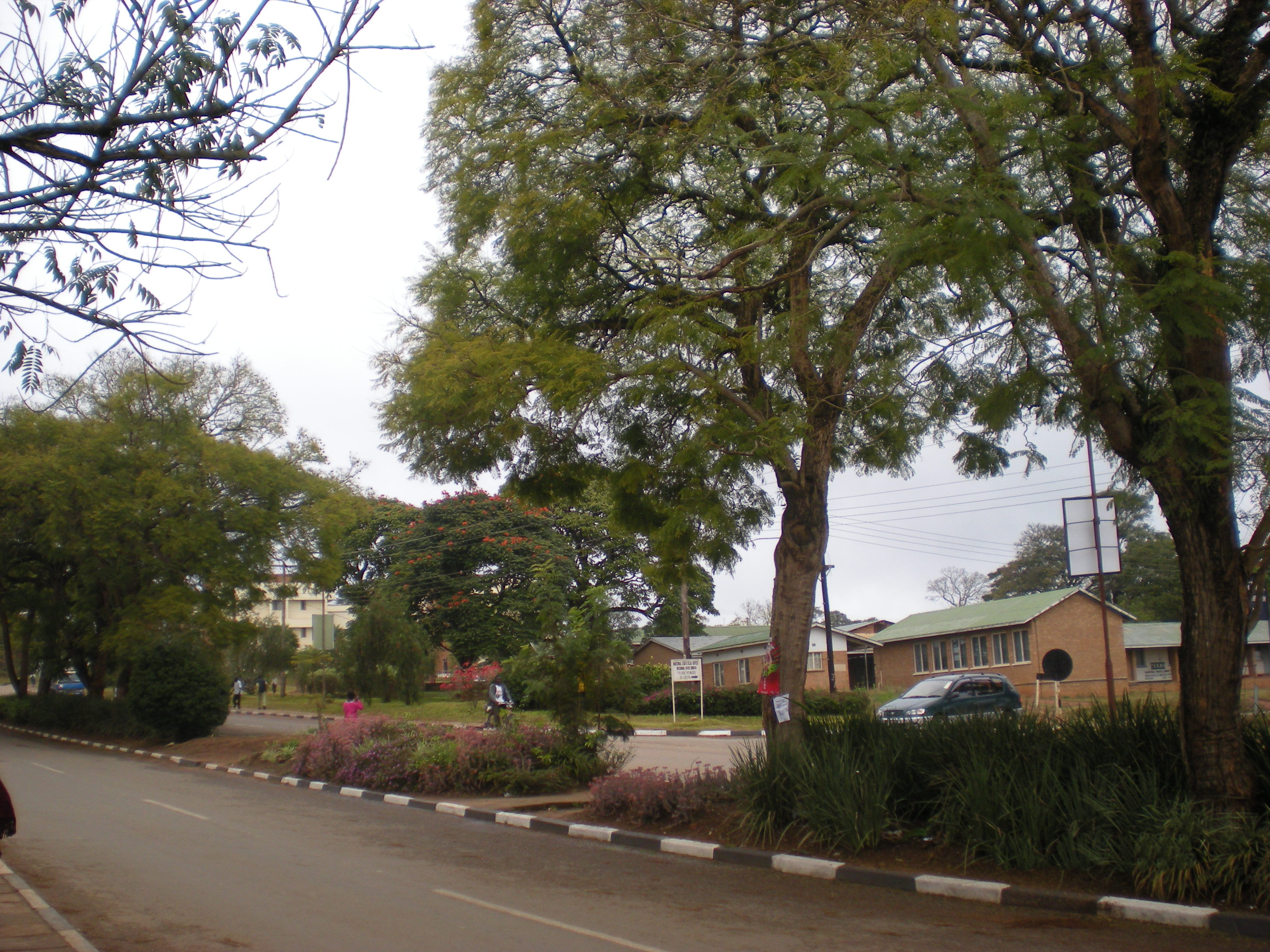
- Mzuzu

- Location in Malawi
- Coordinates: 11.45807°S 34.015131°E
- Country: Malawi
- Region: Northern Region

Population (2018 Census)
  - Total: 221,272
- Time zone: +2
- Climate: Cwb

Mzuzu is the capital of Malawi's Northern Region and is the third largest city by population in Malawi. The city has 221,272 residents and 20,000 commuters (Mzuzu University students) with about a million people in its metropolitan area. It is in the Mzimba District. Mzuzu lies in a gap in the Viphya Mountains, and the agricultural region surrounding the city specializes in tea, rubber and coffee cultivation. The Viphya Plantation south of the city is the largest man-made forest in Africa, and the Lunyangwa and Kaning'ina forest preserves are east of the city.

Sites in the city include Chibavi, Luwinga, Area 1B, Chibanja, Katoto, Zolozolo, Masasa, Mchenga-utuba, Chimaliro, Kaning'ina and Katawa.

== Demographics ==
Historical population
Year	Pop.	±% p.a.
1977	16,108	—
1987	51,904	+12.41%
1998	86,980	+4.81%
2008	133,968	+4.41%
2018	221,272	+5.15%

=== Ethnic groups ===
Ethnic Groups in Mzuzu City (2018 Census)
Ethnic Groups	percent
Tumbuka	51.71%
Chewa	13.51%
Ngoni	8.09%
Tonga	7.36%
Nkhonde	4.08%
Lambya	3.75%
Yao	3.59%
Lomwe	3.54%
Sukwa	1.07%
Sena	0.66%
Mang'anja	0.38%
Nyanja	0.28%
Other	2%

According to the 2018 census, the Tumbuka people are the largest ethnic group in the city, composing 80.50% of the population. Additional ethnic groups constitute 19.50% of the population.

=== Religion ===
Religions in Mzuzu City (2018 Census)
1. Church of Central Africa Presbyterian (28.0%)
2. Catholic (17.3%)
3. Seventh-day Adventist/Baptist/Apostolic (16.3%)
4. Pentecostal (6.62%)
5. Anglican (1.58%)
6. Other Christian (22.2%)
7. Muslim (4.06%)
8. Traditional (0.10%)
9. Other (3.59%)
10. No Religion (0.28%)

The largest religious denomination in Mzuzu is the Church of Central Africa Presbyterian (28.01%). The second largest is Catholicism (17.28%). Other minor religions include Seventh-day Adventist, Baptist, and Apostolic (16.27% combined), Pentecostal (6.62%), Anglican (1.58%), other Christian denominations (22.21%), Islam (4.06%), Traditional (0.1%), other religions (3.59%), and no religion (0.28%) of the city.

== Culture ==
Mzuzu has a museum, opened in 1986, showcasing artifacts from various cultures in the northern region.

== Health ==
Mzuzu City is home to the Mzuzu Central Hospital, one of four hospitals in the country.

== Climate ==
The climate is a subtropical highland climate (Cwb), with ample rainfall throughout the year as well as cool and pleasant temperatures.

Climate data for Mzuzu (1961–1990)
Month	Jan	Feb	Mar	Apr	May	Jun	Jul	Aug	Sep	Oct	Nov	Dec	Year
Mean daily maximum °C (°F)	25.5 (77.9)	25.6 (78.1)	24.8 (76.6)	23.5 (74.3)	22.1 (71.8)	20.4 (68.7)	20.3 (68.5)	21.9 (71.4)	25.1 (77.2)	27.2 (81.0)	27.2 (81.0)	26.1 (79.0)	24.1 (75.4)
Daily mean °C (°F)	19.9 (67.8)	20.0 (68.0)	19.5 (67.1)	18.7 (65.7)	16.4 (61.5)	13.9 (57.0)	13.1 (55.6)	14.0 (57.2)	16.7 (62.1)	19.4 (66.9)	20.5 (68.9)	20.1 (68.2)	17.7 (63.9)
Mean daily minimum °C (°F)	16.1 (61.0)	16.5 (61.7)	16.0 (60.8)	14.9 (58.8)	11.6 (52.9)	7.9 (46.2)	6.5 (43.7)	6.6 (43.9)	8.7 (47.7)	11.7 (53.1)	14.2 (57.6)	15.9 (60.6)	12.2 (54.0)
Average precipitation mm (inches)	203.3 (8.00)	179.5 (7.07)	224.1 (8.82)	213.0 (8.39)	58.8 (2.31)	29.5 (1.16)	30.1 (1.19)	11.8 (0.46)	10.4 (0.41)	35.4 (1.39)	95.7 (3.77)	197.0 (7.76)	1,288.6 (50.73)
Average precipitation days (≥ 0.3 mm)	20	18	20	19	9	6	6	3	2	3	9	18	133
Average relative humidity (%)	82	82	85	86	85	84	83	77	67	62	70	80	79
Mean monthly sunshine hours	145.7	137.2	164.3	171.0	217.0	219.0	238.7	275.9	288.0	300.7	252.0	176.7	2,586.2
Mean daily sunshine hours	4.7	4.9	5.3	5.7	7.0	7.3	7.7	8.9	9.6	9.7	8.4	5.7	7.1
Source: NOAA

== Economy and infrastructure ==
Agricultural products include coffee, timber, fruit, milk and honey. It is the site of Mzuzu University. A 2022 case study on Mzuzu funded by the European Union outlined areas of strength and possibilities for economic growth.

== Education ==
The city is home to Mzuzu University and Mzuzu Academy.

== Tourism ==
Lake Malawi, Vwaza Marsh Wildlife Reserve, and Nyika National Park—Malawi's largest national park—are all located near Mzuzu.

== Transport ==
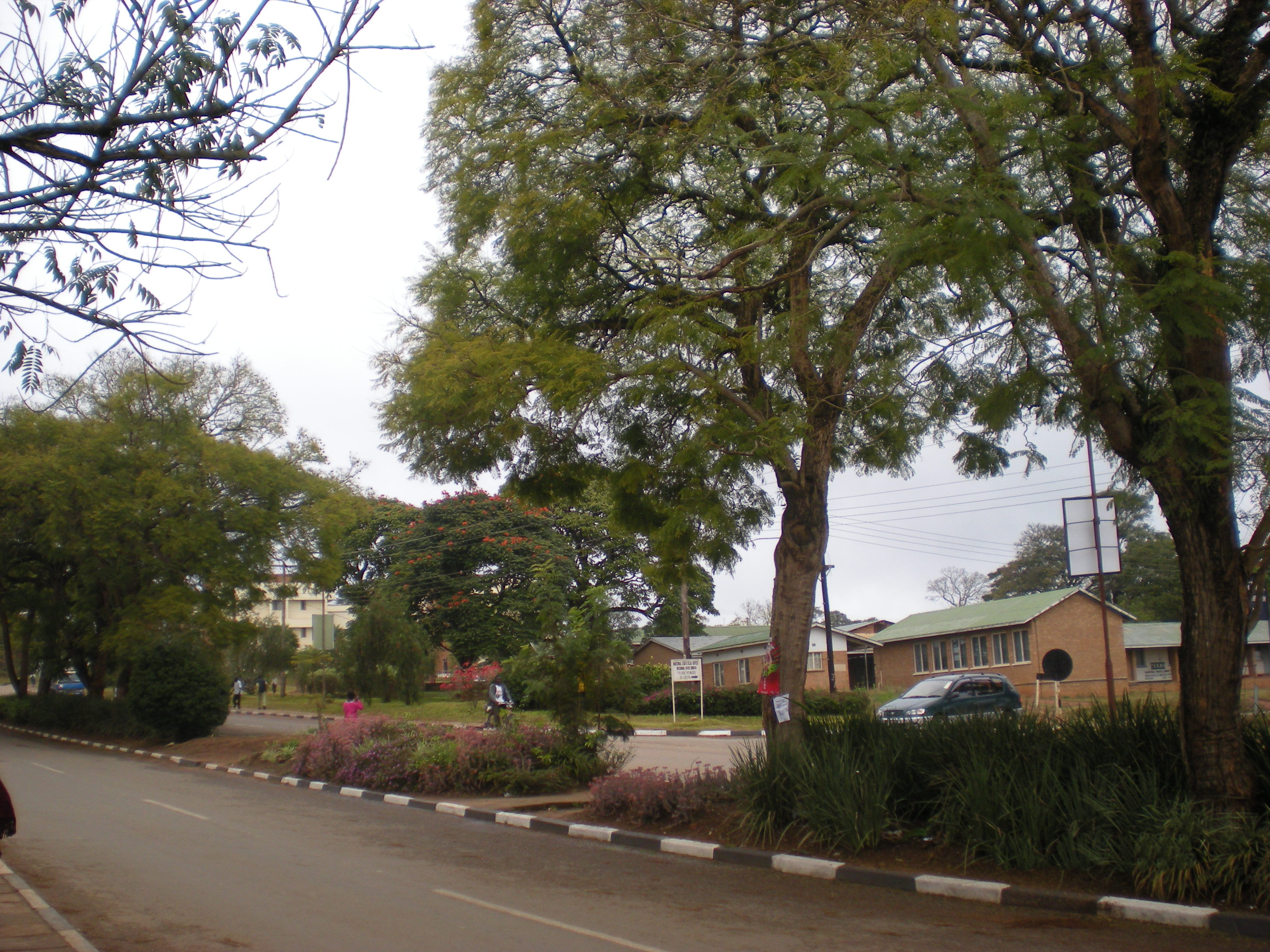
The M5 highway in Mzuzu

Mzuzu City is served by the Mzuzu Airport. In June 2015, Malawi Ministry of Public Works and Transport announced plans to develop a new airport, but a 2022 update suggested that building has not yet begun.

== Sports ==
There are two football teams, Moyale Barracks FC and Mzuni represent the city in the Malawi's top-flight league. Mzuzu Stadium (maximum 15,000 capacity) is the city's sole stadium, built around 1970 by prison labor.

== Notable residents ==
- Shepherd Bushiri, founder of the Enlightened Christian Gathering, is from Mzuzu.
- Tusayiwe Mkhondya is an educator from Mzuzu.
