= Tonga language (Malawi) =

Bantu language spoken in Malawi

Tonga
- Malawi Tonga
- ChiTonga
- Native to: Malawi
- Ethnicity: Tonga
- Native speakers: 165,000 (2018)
- Language family: Niger–Congo?: Atlantic–Congo; Benue–Congo; Bantoid; Bantu; Tumbukic; Tonga
- Writing system: Latin script Mwangwego script

Official status
- Recognised minority language in: Malawi

Language codes
- ISO 639-2: tog
- ISO 639-3: tog
- Glottolog: tong1321
- Guthrie code: N.15

Tonga is a Bantu language spoken in Malawi. It is an offshoot of the Tumbuka language that emerged in the 18th century when the Nkhamanga Kingdom started to decline and was split. Before the arrival of missionaries in what is now known as Malawi, Tonga was the Tumbuka dialect. It was after the missionaries established their churches when they treated the two as separate languages.

Tonga is grouped in the Glottolog classification along with Tumbuka in a single group.

The Tonga language as a legacy offshoot, has been described as "similar" to Tumbuka, and Turner's dictionary (1952) lists only those words which differ from Tumbuka.

Malawian Tonga is classified by Guthrie as being in Zone N15, whereas the Zambian Tonga is a different language classified as Zone M64. Therefore, the two languages are not the same but they only share a similar name.

== Similarities with Tumbuka as its dialect ==
Almost all verbs found in Tumbuka are all available in Tonga. However, there are few slight differences that from an outsider, it may be hard to notice. The two languages are mutually intelligible . Below is paragraph in Tonga and Tumbuka with English translation showing their slight differences:

=== Tonga ===
Fumu ya boma la Nkhata-Bay yapempha mulungozgi wachalu chinu kuti wachitepu kanthu po mitengu ya vinthu iyu ilutiliya ku kwera.

=== Tumbuka ===
Fumu ya boma la Nkhata-Bay yapempha mulongozgi wachalu chino kuti wachitepo kanthu pa mitengo ya vinthu iyo ikulutilila ku kwera.

=== English ===
The chief of Nkhata-Bay District has begged the president of this country to do something about the prices of things that keep on rising.

== Verbs roots ==
Most verb roots in Tonga are toneless, although there are a few such as bangulá "shout" or sambilá "learn/swim" which have a tone on the final syllable of the stem. When a tone is final, as in the verb bangulá "shout", it tends to spread backwards to the penultimate syllable, giving the result bangǔlá (where ǔ represents a rising tone).

== Tenses ==
Tonga tenses are all similar to Tumbuka and are formed as follows:

Present habitual or continuous:

- ndívina – i am dancing (root -vin-)

Monosyllabic verbs or verbs starting with a vowel add -t(ú)- in this tense:

- nditurgha – I eat, I am eating (root -ly-)
- nditénda – I am walking/travelling (root -end-)

Present Perfect

- ndavina - I have danced
- ndargha - I have eaten
- ndayenda - I have walked

Past simple:

- ndinguvína – I danced
- ndingurgha – I ate
- ndingwenda – I walked

Past habitual:

- ndavínanga – I was dancing or I used to dance
- ndarghanga – I was eating or I used to eat
- ndayendanga – I was walking or I used to walk

Simple Future:

- ndívinengi – I will dance
- ndirghengi – I will eat
- ndiyendengi – I will walk

== An example of Tonga ==
An example of a folktale in Tonga, Tumbuka and other languages of Northern Malawi is given in the Language Mapping Survey for Northern Malawi carried out by the Centre for Language Studies of the University of Malawi. The Chitonga version goes as follows:

FUWU NDI KALULU (Chitonga)

Fuwu wanguruta kwachipempha vakurgha ku ŵanthu. Pakupinga thumba laki, wanguchita kumanga kuchingwi chitali ndi kuvwara mu singo laki. Ndipu pakwenda, thumba lazanga kuvuli kwaki.

Penipo wanguwa pa nthowa, Kalulu wanguza kuvuli kwaki ndipu wanguti “Ndato, thumba langu!” Fuwu wanguti “Awa upusika ndangu, wona chingwi ichi ndamanga sonu ndiguza pakwenda”. Kalulu wangukana ndipu wanguti “Tikengi ku Mphala yikatiyeruzgi”. Mphala yingudumuwa mlandu ndi kucheketa chingwi cho Fuwu wangumangiya Thumba. Ŵanguchito thumba liya ndikumpaska Kalulu. Zuwa linyaki lo Kalulu wayendanga, Fuwu wangumusaniya ndipu wanguti, “Ndato mchira wangu!” Kalulu wanguti “ake! yiwi Fuwu m’chira ngwangu.” Fuwu wangukana ndipu wanguti, “Ndato ngwangu”. Ŵanguluta ku Mphala kuti yikayeruzgi. Ku Mphala kuwa, mlandu wungutowe Fuwu. Ŵangudumuwa m’chira waku Kalulu ndi kupaska Fuwu.

(Translation: THE TORTOISE AND THE HARE

Tortoise went to beg food from people. To carry his bag, he tied it to a long string and wore it round his neck. As he walked along, the bag was coming behind him.

When he was on his way, Hare came up behind him and said, "I've found it, my bag!" Tortoise said "No, you're lying, see this string I've tied now I'm pulling it as I go." Hare refused to accept this and said "Let's go the Court, it will judge us." The Court examined the case and cut Tortoise's string which he'd tied the bag with. They took that bag and gave it to Hare. Another day when Hare was walking along, Tortoise found him and said, "I've got my tail!" Hare said, "Nonsense, this is my tail, Tortoise." Tortoise refused to accept this and said, "What I've got is mine." They went to the Court so that it could make a judgement. In that Court, the case went in Tortoise's favour. They cut off Hare's tail and gave it to Tortoise.)

(The Tumbuka version of this story can be found for comparison in the article Tumbuka language#An example of Tumbuka.)
