= Northern Region, Malawi =

Geographic region of Malawi

Northern Region Chigaŵa cha Kumpoto (Tumbuka)
- Region
- Interactive map of Northern Region
- Country: Malawi
- Regional centre: Mzuzu

Area
  - Total: 26,200 km^{2} (10,100 sq mi)

Population (2018 census)
  - Total: 2,420,440
  - Density: 92.4/km^{2} (239/sq mi)

Ethnic groups
  - Major: Tumbuka (90.0%); Ngonde (2.1%); Tonga (1.9%); Sukwa (1.5%); Lambya (1.2%); Chewa (1.2%); Nyiha (1.1%); Whites (0.7); Other (0.9%)

Languages
  - Official regional (common language): Chitumbuka
- Time zone: UTC+2 (Central Africa Time)

The Northern Region is one of the three administrative regions of Malawi, located in the north of the country. It covers an area of approximately 26,200 square kilometres and had a population of 2,420,440 as per the 2018 census, making it the smallest region of Malawi by both area and population. Its regional capital is the city of Mzuzu, which is also the third largest city in Malawi. The common language (lingua franca) of the region is Tumbuka language which is understood by everyone and every ethnic group in the region.

Historically, the first major ethnic group to strengthen its cultural and political presence in the Northern Region were the Tumbuka people, who established themselves primarily in present-day districts of Mzimba, Rumphi, Karonga, Chitipa and parts of Nkhata Bay.

== Geography ==
The Northern Region is bordered by Tanzania to the north and northeast, Lake Malawi to the east, the Central Region to the south, and Zambia to the west. The landscape is predominantly mountainous, including parts of the Nyika Plateau, Viphya Mountains, and the Misuku Hills.

The region is characterized by natural beauty, including national parks such as Nyika National Park and Vwaza Marsh Wildlife Reserve. The region also includes lakeshore towns such as Nkhata Bay and Karonga, which support tourism and fishing industries.

== Districts ==
The Northern Region comprises six administrative districts:

- Chitipa District
- Karonga District
- Likoma District
- Mzimba District
- Nkhata Bay District
- Rumphi District

== Major towns and settlements ==
The following are some of the major towns, cities, and settlements in the Northern Region:

Town/City	District	Notes
Mzuzu	Mzimba District	Regional capital and third largest city in Malawi; also a commercial and education hub.
Mzimba	Mzimba District	District headquarters; predominantly Tumbuka-speaking.
Ekwendeni	Mzimba District	Town known for the Ekwendeni College of Nursing and missionary history.
Embangweni	Mzimba District	Rural town with a Presbyterian mission hospital and secondary school.
Chitipa	Chitipa District	District headquarters; located near the Malawi–Zambia–Tanzania border.
Misuku	Chitipa District	High-altitude rural area known for coffee production and biodiversity.
Karonga	Karonga District	District capital on Lake Malawi; known for trade, fossils, and border commerce.
Chilumba	Karonga District	Lakeshore town with ferry access and fisheries.
Rumphi	Rumphi District	District capital; close to Vwaza Marsh and Nyika National Park.
Livingstonia	Rumphi District	Historic mission town founded by Scottish missionaries; site of University of Livingstonia.
Nkhata Bay	Nkhata Bay District	Major port town on Lake Malawi; known for tourism and fishing.
Likoma	Likoma District	Island town on Lake Malawi; administrative center of the district.
Chizumulu	Likoma District	Smaller island settlement near Likoma Island.
Usisya	Nkhata Bay District	Remote lakeshore settlement accessible by boat and limited roads.

== Climate ==
The Northern Region has a subtropical highland climate, particularly in areas of higher elevation such as Mzimba District, Rumphi, and Mzuzu. Temperatures are cooler than in the Central and Southern Regions, with mild to warm summers and cool winters. Rainfall is concentrated between November and April, while the dry season spans from May to October.

Average climate data for Mzuzu
Month	Jan	Feb	Mar	Apr	May	Jun	Jul	Aug	Sep	Oct	Nov	Dec
Avg high °C	24	24	24	23	22	21	21	22	26	27	26	25
Avg low °C	15	15	14	13	11	9	8	9	12	14	15	15
Rainfall mm	250	230	200	100	20	5	2	2	5	20	90	180

- Source: Malawi Meteorological Services and historical weather averages*

Highland areas such as Livingstonia, Misuku, and Chitipa experience even cooler temperatures. Along the lakeshore, especially in Karonga and Nkhata Bay, temperatures are warmer and more humid, with heavier rainfall.

== Demographics ==
=== Ethnicity and Language ===
The largest ethnic group in the North are the Tumbuka people who form 90% of the entire population. The common language is Chitumbuka language. During the 19th and early 20th centuries, the Tumbuka developed complex chieftaincies and were early adopters of Western education through Christian missions, especially under the Church of Scotland missions at Livingstonia. This resulted in the Tumbuka being perceived, historically, as an educated elite within the Northern Region and parts of Malawi.

Due to their early influence in politics, education, and religion, the Tumbuka language (Chitumbuka) gradually became the lingua franca across most of the Northern Region. It is widely spoken and understood beyond Tumbuka ethnic boundaries, including among the Ngonde, Lambya, Sukwa, and parts of the Tonga population. In rural and inter-ethnic communication contexts throughout the north, Chitumbuka is the most common language used to ensure mutual understanding, even though other indigenous languages such as Chindali, and Chilambya are spoken in specific districts such as Chitipa, and Karonga.

== Economy ==
The economy of the Northern Region is largely based on agriculture, fishing, and small-scale trade. Major cash crops include tobacco, coffee, and maize. The higher elevation of the region supports the production of temperate crops and is suitable for cattle grazing.

Mzuzu, the regional capital, hosts various industries including timber processing, beverage manufacturing, and services. Other important towns such as Karonga and Nkhata Bay also contribute to trade, border commerce, and tourism.

Mining activity exists in limited forms, such as coal in Livingstonia and Rumphi District and rare earth minerals in other areas, though development is ongoing.

== Education ==
The Northern Region is known for its strong educational traditions. Institutions of higher learning include:

- Mzuzu University – a public university based in Mzuzu
- University of Livingstonia – a private institution affiliated with the Church of Central Africa Presbyterian (CCAP), located in Livingstonia
- Ekwendeni College of Nursing – located in Ekwendeni

There are also numerous secondary schools and teacher training colleges throughout the region.

== Culture ==
Cultural life in the Northern Region is vibrant, with traditional dances such as Vimbuza (recognized by UNESCO as Intangible Cultural Heritage), Ingoma, and Malipenga performed at community events and festivals.

Traditional authorities and chieftaincies play an important role in governance and community organization. Cultural heritage is also preserved through local museums and oral storytelling traditions.

== Transport and infrastructure ==
The region is served by the Mzuzu Airport, though international flights are limited. Road transport is the primary mode of travel, with the M1 highway connecting the region to the Central and Southern regions.

Ferry services also operate between the lakeshore towns and islands, including passenger routes to Likoma Island and Chizumulu Island.

== See also ==
- Mzuzu
- Tumbuka people
- Nyika National Park
- Karonga
- Rumphi
- Livingstonia, Malawi
