= Tumbuka language =

Niger-Congo language spoken in Southern and Eastern Africa

Tumbuka
- Chitumbuka
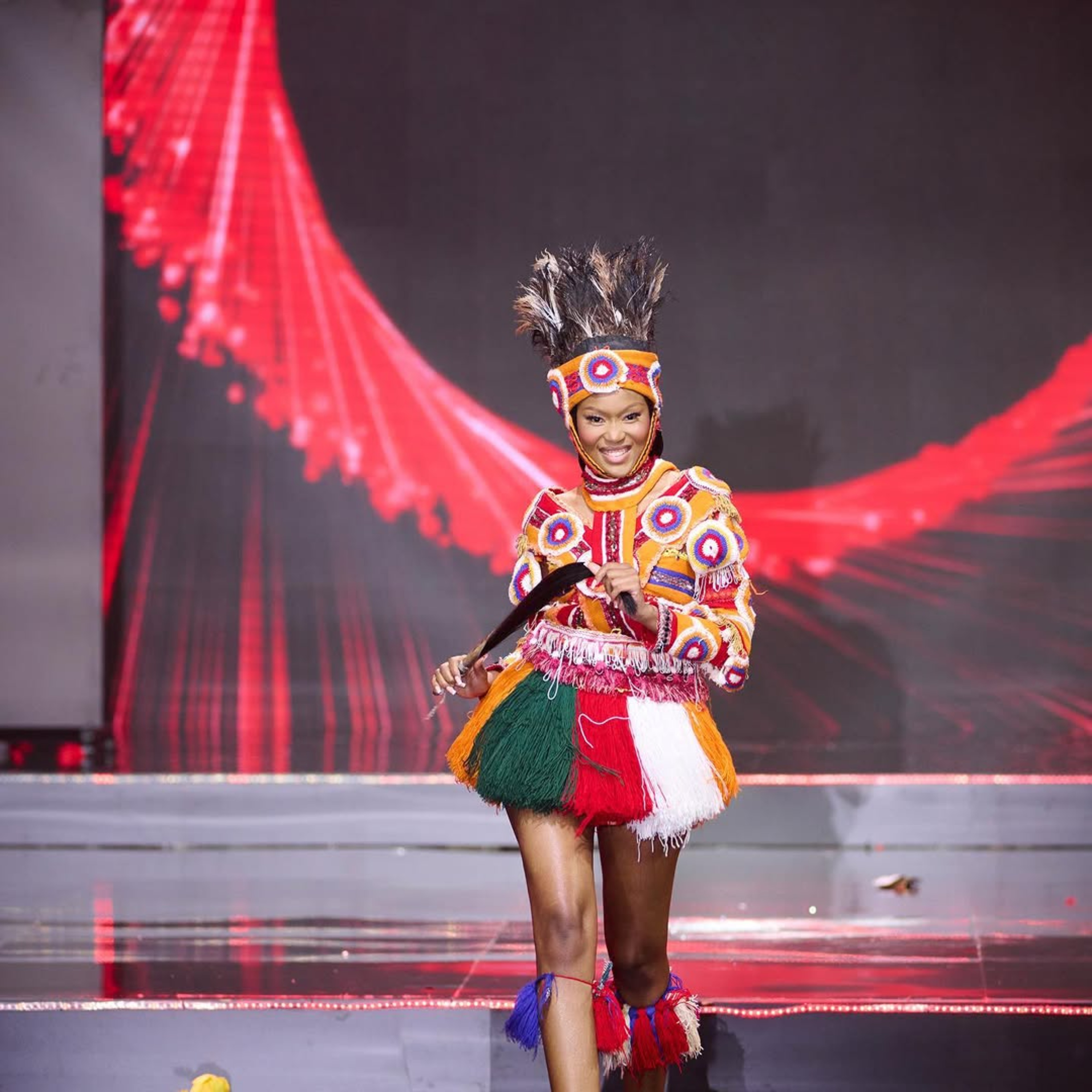
- A Tumbuka young woman from Zambia performing Vimbuza dance of the Tumbuka people in Vietnam.
- Native to: Malawi (5,220,860); Zambia (2,100,709); Tanzania (740,211); Zimbabwe (20,607)
- Region: Southeast Africa and Southern Africa
- Ethnicity: Senga people, Tumbuka, Yombe (Zambia), Phoka (Malawi), Henga, Nenya, Northern Ngoni and Tonga people (Malawi)
- Native speakers: 8.9 million (2024 estimate)
- Language family: Niger–Congo?: Atlantic–Congo; Volta-Congo; Benue–Congo; Bantoid; Southern Bantoid; Bantu (Zone N); Tumbuka
- Dialects: Chikamanga (Malawi); Chiphoka (Malawi); Chisenga (Zambia); Chitumbuka (Malawi, Zambia, Tanzania, Zimbabwe); Chifililwa (Tanzania); Chiyombe (Zambia); Chihewe(Malawi); Chinenya (Malawi, Tanzania); Chinthali (Malawi); Chikandawire (Malawi, Zambia); Chifungwe (Zambia); Chiwenya (Malawi)
- Writing system: Latin script; Mwangwego script

Official status
- Official language in: Malawi (from 1942 - 1968)
- Recognised minority language in: Malawi; Zambia; Tanzania; Zimbabwe

Language codes
- ISO 639-2: tum
- ISO 639-3: tum
- Glottolog: tumb1250
- Guthrie code: N.21
- Linguasphere: 99-AUS-wc (+ chi-Kamanga) incl. varieties 99-AUS-wca...-wcl

Tumbuka or Chitumbuka (also known by other variants such as Senga (Zambia) and other names) is a Bantu language of Central and Southern Africa spoken primarily in Malawi, Zambia, Tanzania, and Zimbabwe. It is the native and primary language of at least more than 13 groups of peoples, namely, the Senga, Tumbuka, Yombe, Phoka, Henga, Balowoka, Fungwe, Hewe, Northern Ngoni, Kamanga and Tonga people (Malawi), with 12 known and studied dialects. The chi- prefix in front of Tumbuka means "the language of", so the language is usually called Chitumbuka even in English publications.

In Northern Malawi, Chitumbuka is spoken in all 6 districts of the region, namely, Rumphi, Mzimba (including Mzuzu City), Karonga, Chitipa, Nkhata-Bay, and Likoma. In Central Malawi, it is spoken primarily in 3 districts of Kasungu, Nkhotakota and Ntchisi.

In the Eastern Province of Zambia, Chitumbuka is spoken mainly in 5 districts, namely, Lumezi, Chasefu, Lundazi and Chama, with some in Chipangali and Chipata. In Muchinga Province of Zambia, Chitumbuka is spoken in the districts of Isoka, Mafinga and surrounding areas.

In Southern Tanzania, it is spoken in Mbeya, Rungwe and Njombe districts that share boundary with Northern Malawi. In Zimbabwe, Chitumbuka is spoken to the lesser extent in Harare due to migrant labour by over 20,000 people who migrated in early 18th century.

== Speakers ==
In 2024, there were approximately 7.1 million native Chitumbuka speakers from all the 3 countries, excluding speakers from Zimbabwe whose data was not added. In Malawi and Zambia, there are nearly 1,600,000 people who speak it as their second language. The majority of Chitumbuka speakers live in Malawi and Zambia, with half a million living in South Tanzania, and over 20,000 in Zimbabwe.

== Official and regional status ==
In 1947, Chitumbuka was made an official language of Malawi for 21 years along with Chewa and English. It was in 1968 when Hastings Kamuzu Banda removed the language as a result of his one-nation, one-language policy. The Chitumbuka language suffered a lot during the rule of President Banda due to his tribalistic and racist policies. Chitumbuka was removed from the school curriculum, the national radio, and the print media. With the advent of multi-party democracy in 1994, Chitumbuka programmes were started again on the radio.

== Dialects ==
There are several dialects of Chitumbuka spoken in three countries. Malawi has Chikamanga, Chiphoka and Chihewe dialects that are spoken in Rumphi and Karonga Districts; Chiwenya spoken in Chitipa District and Chitumbuka spoken in Mzimba and NkhataBay Districts, including Mzuzu City. The Rumphi variant is often regarded as the most "linguistically pure" and is sometimes called "real Chitumbuka".

== Orthography ==
Two systems of writing Tumbuka are in use: the traditional spelling (used for example in the Chitumbuka version of Wikipedia and in the newspaper Fuko), in which words such as banthu 'people' and chaka 'year' are written with 'b' and 'ch', and the new official spelling (used for example in the Citumbuka dictionary published online by the Centre for Language Studies and in the online Bible), in which the same words are written with 'ŵ' and 'c', e.g. ŵanthu and caka. (The sound 'ŵ' is a closely rounded [w] pronounced with the tongue in the close-i position.) There is some uncertainty over where to write 'r' and where 'l', e.g. cakulya (Dictionary) or cakurya (Bible) 'food'. (In fact [l] and [r] are allophones of the same phoneme.) There is also hesitation between the spellings 'sk' and 'sy' (both miskombe and misyombe ('bamboo') are found in the Citumbuka dictionary).

== Phonology ==
=== Vowels ===
The same vowels /a/, /ɛ/, /i/, /ɔ/, /u/ and syllabic /m̩/ are found in Tumbuka as in the neighbouring languages.

Tumbuka greeting "Monile" which means "Hello".

=== Consonants ===
Tumbuka consonants are similar to those of the neighbouring languages of Malawi, Tanzania and Zambia, but with certain differences. The continuant sounds /ɣ/, /β/ and /h/, which are absent or marginal in other related languages, are common in Tumbuka. Also common are the palatalised sounds /vʲ/, /fʲ/, /bʲ/, /pʲ/, /skʲ/, /zgʲ/, and /ɽʲ/. In Tumbuka there are no affricates such as /psʲ/, /bzʲ/, /t͡s/, /d͡z/. The sounds /s/ and /z/ are never nasalised in Tumbuka, so that Chewa nsómba ('fish') = Tumbuka somba. The sound /ʃ/ is found only in foreign words such as shati ('shirt') and shuga ('sugar'). Tumbuka /ɽ/ sometimes corresponds to /d/, for example Chewa kudwala 'to be ill' = Tumbuka kulwala, Chewa kudya 'to eat' = Tumbuka kulya. The pronunciation of "sk" and "zg" varies according to dialect.

Tumbuka consonants are frequently either palatalised (i.e. followed by /j/) or rounded (i.e. followed by /w/.) Some of them can also be preceded by a homorganic nasal (/n/, /ŋ/ or /m/). The possible consonant combinations are shown in the table below:

Table of Tumbuka consonants
		Labial			Dental			Palatal		Velar		Glottal
		plain	lab.	pal.	plain	lab.	pal.	plain	lab.	plain	lab.	Glottal
Nasal		m /m/	mw /mʷ/	my /mʲ/	n /n/	nw /nʷ/	ny /nʲ/			ng' /ŋ/	ng'w /ŋʷ/	
Plosive/ Affricate	unvoiced	p /p/	pw /pʷ/	py /pʲ/	t /t/	tw /tʷ/	ty /tʲ/	c /t͡ʃ/	cw /t͡ʃʷ/	k /k/	kw /kʷ/	
Plosive/ Affricate	voiced	b /ɓ/	bw /ɓʷ/	by /bʲ/	d /ɗ/	dw /ɗʷ/	dy /ɗʲ/	j /d͡ʒ/	jw /d͡ʒʷ/	g /g/	gw /gʷ/	
Plosive/ Affricate	aspirated	ph /pʰ/	phw /pʷʰ/	phy /pʲʰ/	th /tʰ/	thw /tʷʰ/	thy /tʲʰ/	ch /t͡ʃʰ/		kh /kʰ/	khw /kʷʰ/	
Plosive/ Affricate	nasalised	mb /ᵐb/	mbw /ᵐbʷ/	mby /ᵐbʲ/	nd /ⁿd/	ndw /ⁿdʷ/	(ndy) (Note: Only in the word ndyali.) /ⁿdʲ/	nj /ⁿd͡ʒ/		ng /ᵑg/	ngw /ᵑgʷ/	
Plosive/ Affricate	nasalised aspirated	mph /ᵐpʰ/	mphw /ᵐpʷʰ/	mphy /ᵐpʲʰ/	nth /ⁿtʰ/	nthw /ⁿtʷʰ/	(nthy) /ⁿtʲʰ/	nch /ⁿt͡ʃʰ/		nkh /ᵑkʰ/	nkhw /ᵑkʷʰ/	
Fricative	unvoiced	f /f/	fw /fʷ/	fy /fʲ/	s /s/	sw /sʷ/	sk (sy) /sʲ/	(sh) /ʃ/				h /h/
Fricative	voiced	v /v/	vw /vʷ/	vy /vʲ/	z /z/	zw /zʷ/	zg /zʲ/					
Semivowel/ Liquid		ŵ /β/	w /w/		l/r /ɽ/	lw/rw /ɽʷ/	ly/ry /ɽʲ/	y /j/		gh /ɣ/		

=== Tone ===
Tumbuka has a tonal accent but in a very limited way, in that every word, spoken in isolation, has the same falling tone on the penultimate syllable (which also coincides with stress). It is therefore not possible in Tumbuka to contrast two different words or two different tenses tonally, as it is in other Bantu languages. However, this penultimate falling tone occurs not on every word, but only on the last word of a phonological phrase; e.g. in the following sentence, only the second word has a tone, the first being toneless:

- ti-ku-phika sî:ma 'we are cooking porridge'

A greater variety of tonal patterns is found in the ideophones (expressive words) of Tumbuka; for example Low (yoyoyo 'disintegrating into small pieces'), High (fyá: 'swooping low (of birds)'), High-Low (phúli 'sound of thing bursting'), and Low-High (yií 'sudden disappearance'), etc.

Intonational tones are also used in Tumbuka; for example, in yes-no questions there is often a High-Low fall on the final syllable of the question:

- ku-limirâ-so ngô:mâ? 'are you also weeding the maize?'

There does not seem to be any consistent, direct correlation between tone in Tumbuka and focus.

== Nouns ==
=== Noun classes ===
As is usual with Bantu languages, Tumbuka nouns are grouped into different noun classes according to their singular and plural prefixes. Each class of noun has its own adjective, pronoun, and verb agreements, known as 'concords'. Where the agreements disagree with the prefix, the agreements take precedence in deciding the class of noun. For example, the noun katundu 'possessions', despite having the prefix ka-, is placed in class 1, since one says katundu uyu 'these possessions' using the class 1 demonstrative uyu. Malawians themselves (e.g. in the University of Malawi's Citumbuka dictionary) refer to the noun classes by traditional names such as "Mu-Ŵa-"; Bantu specialists, however, refer to the classes by numbers (1/2 etc.) corresponding to the noun-classes of other Bantu languages. Occasionally nouns do not correspond to the classes below, e.g. fumu 'chief' (class 9) irregularly has a plural mafumu in class 6.

Class 1/2 (Mu-Ŵa-)

Some nouns in this class lack the prefix Mu-:

- Munthu pl. ŵanthu (banthu) = person
- Muzungu pl. ŵazungu (bazungu) = foreigner, white man
- Mwana pl. ŵana (bana) = child
- Bulu pl. ŵabulu = donkey
- Sibweni pl. ŵasibweni = maternal uncle
- Katundu (no pl.) = goods, possessions

Class 3/4 (Mu-Mi-)

- Mutu pl. mitu = head
- Mkuyu pl. mikuyu = fig-tree
- Moyo pl. miyoyo = life
- Mtima pl. mitima = heart

Class 5/6 (Li-Ma-)

- Bele (bhele pl. mabele (mabhele) = breast
- Boma (bhoma) pl. maboma (mabhoma) = government, district
- Botolo (bhotolo) pl. mabotolo (mabhotolo) = bottle
- Fuko pl. mafuko = tribe, nation
- Jiso pl. maso = eye
- Maji (no singular) = water
- Phiri pl. mapiri = hill
- Suzgo pl. masuzgo = problem, trouble
- Woko pl. mawoko = hand

Class 7/8 (Ci-Vi-)

- Caka (chaka) pl. vyaka = year
- Caro (charo) pl. vyaro = country, land
- Ciŵeto (chibeto) pl. viŵeto (vibeto) = farm animal
- Cidakwa (chidakwa) pl. vidakwa = drunkard
- Cikoti (chikoti) pl. vikoti = whip

Class 9/10 (Yi-Zi-)

- Mbale pl. mbale (mambale) = plate
- Ndalama pl. ndalama = money
- Njelwa pl. njelwa = brick
- Nkhuku pl. nkhuku = chicken
- Somba pl. somba = fish

Class 11 (Lu-)

Some speakers treat words in this class as if they were in class 5/6.

- Lwande = side
- Lumbiri = fame
- Lulimi = tongue

Class 12/13 (Ka-Tu-)

- Kanthu (kantu) pl. tunthu (tuntu) = small thing
- Kamwana pl. tuŵana (tubana) = baby
- Kayuni pl. tuyuni = bird
- Tulo (no singular) = sleep

Class 14/6 (U-Ma-)

These nouns are frequently abstract and have no plural.

- Usiku = night
- Ulimi = farming
- Ulalo pl. maulalo = bridge
- Uta pl. mauta = bow

Class 15 (Ku-) Infinitive

- Kugula = to buy, buying
- Kwiba (kwibha) = to steal, stealing

Classes 16, 17, 18 (Pa-, Ku-, Mu-) Locative

- Pasi = underneath
- Kunthazi (kuntazi) = in front, before
- Mukati = inside

=== Concords ===
Verbs, adjectives, numbers, possessives, and pronouns in Tumbuka have to agree with the noun referred to. This is done by means of prefixes, infixes, or suffixes called 'concords' which differ according to the class of noun. Class 1 has the greatest variety of concords, differing for pronouns, subject prefix, object infix, numbers, adjectives, and possessives:

- Mwana uyu = this child
- Mwana yumoza = one child
- Mwana uyo = that child
- Mwana yose = the whole child
- Mwana waliyose = every child
- Mwana wakamuwona = the child saw him
- Mwana muchoko (coko) = the small child
- Mwana wa Khumbo = Khumbo's child
- Mwana wane = my child
- Mwana wawona = the child has seen

Other noun classes have a smaller variety of concords, as can be seen from the table below:

Table of Tumbuka concords
	noun	English	this	num	that	all	subj	object	adj	of	perf
1	mwana	child	uyu	yu-	uyo	yose	wa-	-mu-	mu-	wa	wa-
2	ŵana	children	aŵa	ŵa-	awo	wose	ŵa-	-ŵa-	ŵa-	ŵa	ŵa-
3	mutu	head	uwu	wu-	uwo	wose	wu-	-wu-	wu-	wa	wa-
4	mitu	heads	iyi	yi-	iyo	yose	yi-	-yi-	yi-	ya	ya-
5	jiso	eye	ili	li-	ilo	lose	li-	-li-	li-	la	la-
6	maso	eyes	agha	gha-	agho	ghose	gha-	-gha-	gha-	gha	gha-
7	caka	year	ici	ci-	ico	cose	ci-	-ci-	ci-	ca	ca-
8	vyaka	years	ivi	vi-	ivyo	vyose	vi-	-vi-	vi-	vya	vya-
9	nyumba	house	iyi	yi-	iyo	yose	yi-	-yi-	yi-	ya	ya-
10	nyumba	houses	izi	zi-	izo	zose	zi-	-zi-	zi-	za	za-
11	lwande	side	ulu	lu-	ulo	lose	lu-	-lu-	lu-	lwa	lwa-
		(or:	ili	li-	ilo	lose	li-	-li-	li-	la	la-)
12	kayuni	bird	aka	ka-	ako	kose	ka-	-ka-	ka-	ka	ka-
13	tuyuni	birds	utu	tu-	uto	tose	tu-	-tu-	tu-	twa	twa-
14	uta	bow	uwu	wu-	uwo	wose	wu-	-wu-	wu-	wa	wa-
15	kugula	buying	uku	ku-	uko	kose	ku-	-ku-	ku-	kwa	kwa-
16	pasi	underneath	apa	pa-	apo	pose	pa-	-pa-	pa-	pa	pa-
17	kunthazi	in front	uku	ku-	uko	kose	ku-	-ku-	ku-	kwa	kwa-
18	mukati	inside	umu	mu-	umo	mose	mu-	-mu-	mu-	mwa	mwa-

== Sample phrases and text ==
The following is a list of phrases that can be used when one visits a region whose primary language is Tumbuka:

Tumbuka	English
Moni	Hello
Monile	hello, to a group of people
Muli makola? Mwaŵa uli?	how are you?
Muli makola? Mwaŵa uli?	How are you?, to a group of people
Nili makola	I'm okay
Tili makola	We're okay
Naonga (chomene)	Thank you (a lot)
Yewo (chomene)	Thanks (a lot)
Ndiwe njani zina lako?	What is your name?
Zina lane ndine....	My name is....
Nyengo ili uli?	What is the time?
Ningakuvwila?	Can I help you?
Uyende makola	Goodbye/go well/safe travels
Mwende makola	Goodbye/go well/safe travels (said to a group of people)
Enya/ Eh	Yes
Yayi/Chala	No
Kwali	I don't know
Mukumanya kuyowoya Chizungu?	Can you speak English?
Nayambapo kusambilila ChiTumbuka	I've just started learning Tumbuka
Mukung'anamula vichi?	What do you mean?
Chonde, ningaluta kubafa?	May I please go to the bathroom?
Nakutemwa/Nkhukutemwa	"I love you"
Phepa	Sorry
Phepani	Sorry (to agroup of people)
Banja	Family
Yowoya	Talk/speak

== Verbs ==
=== Subject prefix ===
All verbs must have a subject prefix, which agrees with the subject noun. For example, the word ciŵinda 'hunter' is class 7, so if it is subject, the verb has the prefix ci-:

ciŵinda ci-ka-koma nkhalamu = 'the hunter killed a lion'

It is also possible for the subject to be a locative noun (classes 16, 17, 18), in which case the verb has a locative prefix:

pamphasa pa-ka-khala mwana = 'on the mat there sat down a child'

The locative prefix ku- (class 17) is also used impersonally when discussing the weather:

kukuzizima madazi ghano = 'it's cold these days'

When the subject is a personal pronoun, the subject prefixes are as follows (the pronoun itself may be omitted, but not the subject prefix):

(ine) n-kha-gula = 'I bought' (nkha- stands for ni-ka-)
(iwe) u-ka-gula = 'you bought' (informal, singular)
(iyo) wa-ka-gula = 'he, she bought'
(ise) ti-ka-gula = 'we bought'
(imwe) mu-ka-gula = 'you bought' (plural or respectful)
(iwo) ŵa-ka-gula = 'they bought', 'he/she bought' (plural or respectful)

In the perfect tense, these are shortened to n-a-, w-a-, w-a-, t-a-, mw-a-, ŵ-a-, e.g. t-a-gula 'we have bought'.

In Karonga dialect, in the 3rd person singular a- is found instead of wa-, and the 3rd plural is wa- instead of ŵa-, except in the perfect tense, when wa- and ŵa- are used.

=== Object-marker ===
To indicate the object, an infix can be added to the verb immediately before the verb root. Generally speaking, the object-marker is optional:

Pokani wa(yi)gula galimoto = 'Pokani has bought a car' (class 9)
Changa waka(mu)nyamula katundu = 'Changa carried the luggage' (class 1)

The object-marker agrees with the class of the object, as shown on the table of concords above.

The object-marker can also be a locative (classes 16, 17, or 18):

Kondwani wa(pa)kwera pa nyumba = 'Kondwani has climbed on top of the house'

The locative markers for personal pronouns are as follows:

waniona (ine) = 'he has seen me'
wakuona (iwe) = 'he has seen you'
wamuona = 'he has seen him/her'
wationa = 'he has seen us'
wamuonani = 'he has seen you' (plural or respectful)
waŵaona = 'he has seen them'

=== Tenses ===
Tenses in Tumbuka are made partly by adding infixes, and partly by suffixes. Unlike Chichewa, tones do not form any part of the distinction between one tense and another.

In the past a distinction is made between hodiernal tenses (referring to events of today) and remote tenses (referring to events of yesterday or some time ago). However, the boundary between recent and remote is not exact.

Another distinction is made between past and perfect tenses. When a perfect tense is used it carries an implication that the resulting situation still exists at the time of speaking, for example: 'the pumpkins have spread (zathambalala) over the garden'. The present perfect can also be used in verbs expressing a current situation such as ndakhala 'I am sitting' or ndakondwa 'I am pleased'. The remote perfect is used for events which happened some time ago but of which the effects still apply today, such as libwe lilikuwa 'the rock has fallen' or walikutayika 'he (has) died'.

The future tenses similarly distinguish near from remote events. Some tenses imply that the event will take place elsewhere, for example ndamukuchezga 'I will go and visit'.

Compound tenses are also found in Tumbuka, such as wati wagona 'he had slept', wakaŵa kuti wafumapo 'he had just left' and wazamukuŵa waguliska 'he will have sold'.

Some Tumbuka tenses
Tense	Tense marker	Example	Translation
Present infinitive	ku-	ku-luta	'to go'
Present simple	-ku-	wa-ku-luta	'he/she goes/is going'
Present habitual	-ku-...-anga	wa-ku-lut-anga	'he/she goes' (some speakers only)
Present perfect	-a-	w-a-luta	'he/she has gone'
Present perfect continuous	-a-...-anga	w-a-lut-anga	'he/she has been going'
Remote perfect	-liku-	wa-liku-luta	'he/she has gone'
Recent past simple	-angu-	w-angu-luta	'he/she went' (today)
Recent past continuous	-angu-...-anga	w-angu-lut-anga	'he/she was going' (today)
Remote past simple	-ka-	wa-ka-luta	'he/she went'
Remote past continuous	-ka-...-anga	wa-ka-lut-anga	'he/she was going/used to go'
Near future	...-enge	wa-lut-enge	'he will go' (now or today)
Emphatic future	-ti-...-enge	wa-ti-lut-enge	'he will certainly go'
Distal future	-amu-(ku)-	w-amuku-gula	'he/she will buy' (elsewhere)
Remote future	-zamu-(ku)-	wa-zamu-luta	'he/she will go' (tomorrow or later)
Remote future continuous	-zamu-...-anga	wa-zamu-lut-anga	'he/she will be going' (tomorrow or later)
Present subjunctive	-e	ti-lut-e	'let's go'
Distal subjunctive	-ka-...-e	wa-ka-gul-e	'so that he can buy (elsewhere)'
Potential	-nga-	wa-nga-luta	'he can go'

Other future tenses are given by Vail (1972) and others.

In the 1st person singular, ni-ku- and ni-ka- are shortened to nkhu- and nkha-: nkhuluta 'I am going', 'I go', nkhalutanga 'I used to go'.

=== Negative verbs ===
To make the negative of a verb in Tumbuka, the word yayi or cha(ra) is added at or near the end of the clause. It seems that yayi is preferred by younger speakers:

wakulemba kalata yayi
'he is not writing a letter'

tizamugwira ntchito cha machero
'we will not work tomorrow'

With the present perfect tense, however, a separate form exists, adding -nda- and ending in -e:

enya, nakumana nawo
'yes, I have met him'

yayi, nindakumane nawo
'no, I haven't met him'

== The Ngoni influence on Tumbuka ==
All Tumbuka dialects have to some extent been affected by the Zulu language (chiNgoni), most especially in Mzimba District. Ngoni originated from the Ndwandwe people who were neighbours to the Zulu clan prior to being conquered by the Zulu and assimilated into the Zulu identity. The language the Ndwandwe spoke was thus nearly identical Zulu. Below are some examples of words found in chitumbuka that are of Zulu/Ndwandwe origin, though most of them have original Tumbuka counterpart words that can be used interchangeably at the speakers will, (excluding 'munwe/minwe' meaning 'finger/fingers' for example, that seemingly did not have an original counterpart or the original word has been lost). The word njowi is used for finger/s. The Mzimba dialect goes so far as to have click consonants in words like chitha [ʇʰitʰa] "urinate", which do not occur in other dialects.

English	Tumbuka	Tumbuka-Ngoni dialect
See	Wona	Bheka
Smoke	Khweŵa	Bhema
Man	Mwanalume	Doda
Virgin	Mwali	Nthombi

== Examples ==
Months in Tumbuka:

English	Tumbuka
January	Mathipa
February	Muswela
March	Nyakanyaka
April	Masika
May	Vuna
June	Zizima
July	Mphepo
August	Mpupulu
September	Lupya
October	Zimya
November	Thukila
December	Vula

An example of a folktale translated into Tumbuka and other languages of Northern Malawi is given in the Language Mapping Survey for Northern Malawi carried out by the Centre for Language Studies of the University of Malawi. The Tumbuka version of the folktale goes as follows:

KALULU NA FULU (Citumbuka)
Fulu wakaluta kukapemphiska vyakulya ku ŵanthu. Pakuyeya thumba lake wakacita kukaka ku cingwe citali na kuvwara mu singo, ndipo pakwenda thumba lake likizanga kunyuma kwakhe.

Wali mu nthowa, kalulu wakiza kunyuma kwakhe ndipo wakati "bowo, thumba lane!" Fulu wakati, "Thumba ndane iwe, wona cingwe ici ndakaka sono nkhuguza pakwenda." Kalulu wakakana nipera, ndipo wakati "Tilute ku Mphala yikateruzge." Mphala yikadumula mlandu na kuceketa cingwe ico Fulu wakakakira thumba. Ŵakatola thumba lira ndipo ŵakapa kalulu.

Pa zuŵa linyakhe Kalulu wakendanga, Fulu wakamsanga ndipo wakati, "Bowo, mcira wane!" Kalulu wakati, "Ake! Fulu iwe m'cira ngwane." Fulu wakakana, ndipo wakati, "Ndasola ngwane." Ŵakaluta ku mphala, kuti yikaŵeruzge. Ku Mphala kula mlandu ukatowera Fulu. Ŵakadumula m'cira wa Kalulu nakupa Fulu.

(Translation)
THE TORTOISE AND THE HARE
Tortoise went to beg food from people. To carry his bag, he tied it to a long string and wore it round his neck. As he walked along, the bag was coming behind him.

As he was on his way, Hare came up behind him and said, "There it is, my bag!" Tortoise said "The bag is mine, see this string I've tied now I'm pulling it as I go." Hare refused to accept this and said "Let's go the Court, so that it can judge us." The Court examined the case and cut Tortoise's string which he'd tied the bag with. They took that bag and gave it to Hare.

Another day when Hare was walking along, Tortoise found him and said, "There it is, my tail!" Hare said, "Nonsense, this is my tail, Tortoise." Tortoise refused to accept this and said, "What I've got is mine." They went to the Court so that it could make a judgement. In that Court, the case went in Tortoise's favour. They cut off Hare's tail and gave it to Tortoise.

== Some vocabulary ==
=== Helpful phrases ===
- Enya = Yes
- Yayi = No
- Yebo (yeŵo) = Thank you
- Taonga = We are thankful
- Nkhukhumba chakurya! = I want some food !
- Munganipako chakurya? = could you give me some food?
- Ine nkhuyowoya chiTumbuka yayi! = I do not speak chiTumbuka!
- Yendani makola = Travel well.
- Nkukhumba maji yakumwa = I would like water to drink.

=== Greetings ===
- Mwawuka uli? = Good morning. (How did you wake up?)
- Tawuka makola. Kwali imwe? = Fine. And you? (I woke up well. I don't know about you?)
- Muli uli? = How are you?
- Nili makola, kwali imwe? = I am fine, how are you?
- Mwatandala uli? = Good afternoon. (How did you spend the day?)
- Natandala makola. Kwali imwe? = Good afternoon. How are you? (I spent the day well. I don't know about you?)
- Monile = somewhat more formal than "Hi". Perhaps best translated as "Greetings".
- Tionanenge = We shall meet again.

=== People ===
The plural ba- (ŵa-) is often used for politeness when referring to elders:

- Munyamata = boy
- Banyamata (ŵanyamata) = boys
- Musungwana = girl
- Basungwana (ŵasungwana) = girls
- Bamwali (ŵamwali) = young ladies
- Banchembere (ŵancembele) = a woman with babies
- Bamama (ŵamama) = mother
- Badada(ŵadhadha) = dad
- Bagogo (ŵagogo) = grandmother
- Babuya (ŵabhuya) = grandmother, also used when addressing old female persons
- Basekulu (ŵasekulu) = grandfather
- Bankhazi (ŵankhazi) = paternal aunt
- ŵa/Bamama ŵa/bachoko / ŵa/bakulu = maternal aunt usually your mother's younger/older sister
- Basibweni (ŵasibweni) = maternal uncle
- Badada(ŵadhadha) bachoko / bakulu = paternal uncle usually your father's younger/older brother
- Mudumbu(mudhumbu) wane = my brother/ sister (for addressing a sibling of the opposite sex)
- Muchoko wane / muzuna wane/ munung'una wane = my young brother / sister (for addressing a sibling of the same sex)
- Mukuru wane / mulala wane = my elder brother / sister (for addressing a sibling of the same sex)

=== Verbs ===
- Kusebela (Kuseŵera) = to play
- Kuseka = to laugh
- Kurya = to eat
- Kugona = to sleep
- Kwenda = to walk
- Kuchimbila = to run
- Kulemba = to write
- Kuchapa = to do laundry
- Kugeza = to bath
- Kuphika = to cook
- Kulima = to dig / cultivate
- Kupanda = to plant
- Kuvina = to dance
- Kwimba = to sing

=== Animals ===
- Fulu = tortoise
- Kalulu = hare
- Gwere = hippo
- Chimbwi = hyena
- Njoka = snake
- Nkhumba = pig
- Ng'ombe = cow
- Nchebe (Ncheŵe) = dog
- Chona/pusi/kiti = cat
- Mbelele = sheep
- Nkalamu = lion
- Mbuzi = goat
- Nkhuku = chicken

== See also ==
- Tumbuka people
- Tumbuka mythology

== Notable Tumbuka People ==
- Sheperd Bushiri (Christian preacher)
- Mwai Kumwenda (netball player)
- Briddget Kumwenda (netball player)
- Chakufwa Chihana (human rights activist and politician)
- Enoch Chihana (member of parliament)

== Bibliography ==
- Botne, Robert (1999). "Future and distal -ka-'s: Proto-Bantu or nascent form(s)?". In: Jean-Marie Hombert and Larry M. Hyman (eds.), Bantu Historical Linguistics: Theoretical and Empirical Perspectives. Stanford, CA: Center for the Study of Language and Information, pp. 473–515.
- Chase, Robert (2004). "A Comparison of Demonstratives in the Karonga and Henga Dialects of Tumbuka". Undergraduate paper. Amherst: Dept. of Linguistics, Univ. of Massachusetts.
- Chavula, Jean Josephine (2016). "Verbal derivation and valency in Chitumbuka". Leiden University doctoral thesis.
- Downing, Laura J. (2006). "The Prosody and Syntax of Focus in Chitumbuka". ZAS Papers in Linguistics 43, 55-79.
- Downing, Laura J. (2008). "Focus and prominence in Chichewa, Chitumbuka and Durban Zulu". ZAS Papers in Linguistics 49, 47-65.
- Downing, Laura J. (2012). "On the (Non-)congruence of Focus and Prominence in Tumbuka". Selected Proceedings of the 42nd Annual Conference on African Linguistics, ed. Michael R. Marlo et al., 122-133. Somerville, MA: Cascadilla Proceedings Project.
- Downing, Laura J. (2017). "Tone and intonation in Chichewa and Tumbuka". In Laura J. Downing & Annie Rialland (eds) Intonation in African Tone Languages. de Gruyter, Berlin/Boston, pp. 365–392.
- Downing, Laura J. (2019). "Tumbuka prosody: Between tone and stress". In: Emily Clem et al (eds). Theory and Description in African Linguistics: Selected papers from the 47th Annual Conference on African Linguistics, 75-94. Also available online at:
- Elmslie, Walter Angus (1923): Introductory Grammar of the Tumbuka Language. Livingstonia Mission Press.
- Kamwendo, Gregory H. (2004). Kamwendo "Your Chitumbuka is Shallow. It's not the Real Chitumbuka: Linguistic Purism Among Chitumbuka Speakers in Malawi", Nordic Journal of African Studies 13(3): 275–288.
- Kishindo, Pascal J. et Allan L. Lipenga (2006). Parlons citumbuka : langue et culture du Malawi et de la Zambie, L'Harmattan, Paris, Budapest, Kinshasa, 138 pages. ISBN 2-296-00470-9
- Kishindo, Pascal J. (ed), Jean J. Chavula and others (2018). Mung'anamulira mazgo wa Citumbuka (Citumbuka dictionary). Centre for Language Studies, University of Malawi. ISBN 978-99960-9-610-5
- Kiso, Andrea (2012). "Tense and Aspect in Chichewa, Citumbuka, and Cisena". Ph.D. Thesis. Stockholm University.
- McNicholl, Duncan (2010). "The No-Nonsense Guide to Learning Chitumbuka: Volume 1".
- Moto, Francis (1999). "The Tonal Phonology of Bantu Ideophones". Malilime: Malawian Journal of Linguistics no.1, 100-120. (pp. 112–119 deals with tone in Chitumbuka ideophones).
- Mphande, L. (1989). "A Phonological Analysis of the Ideophone in Chitumbuka". Ph.D. Dissertation. The University of Texas, Austin.
- Shiozaki, Lisa (2004). "Concordial agreement in the Karonga dialect of Tumbuka". Undergraduate paper. Amherst: Dept. of Linguistics, Univ. of Massachusetts.
- Turner, W.M. (1952). Tumbuka–Tonga–English Dictionary The Hetherwick Press, Blantyre, Nyasaland (now Malawi).
- University of Malawi Centre for Language Studies (2006). "Language Mapping Survey for Northern Malawi".
- Vail, Hazen Leroy (1971). "The noun classes of Tumbuka". African studies, v. 30, 1, p. 35-59.
- Vail, Hazen Leroy (1972). "Aspects of the Tumbuka Verb". Ph.D. dissertation, University of Wisconsin.
