= William Koyi =

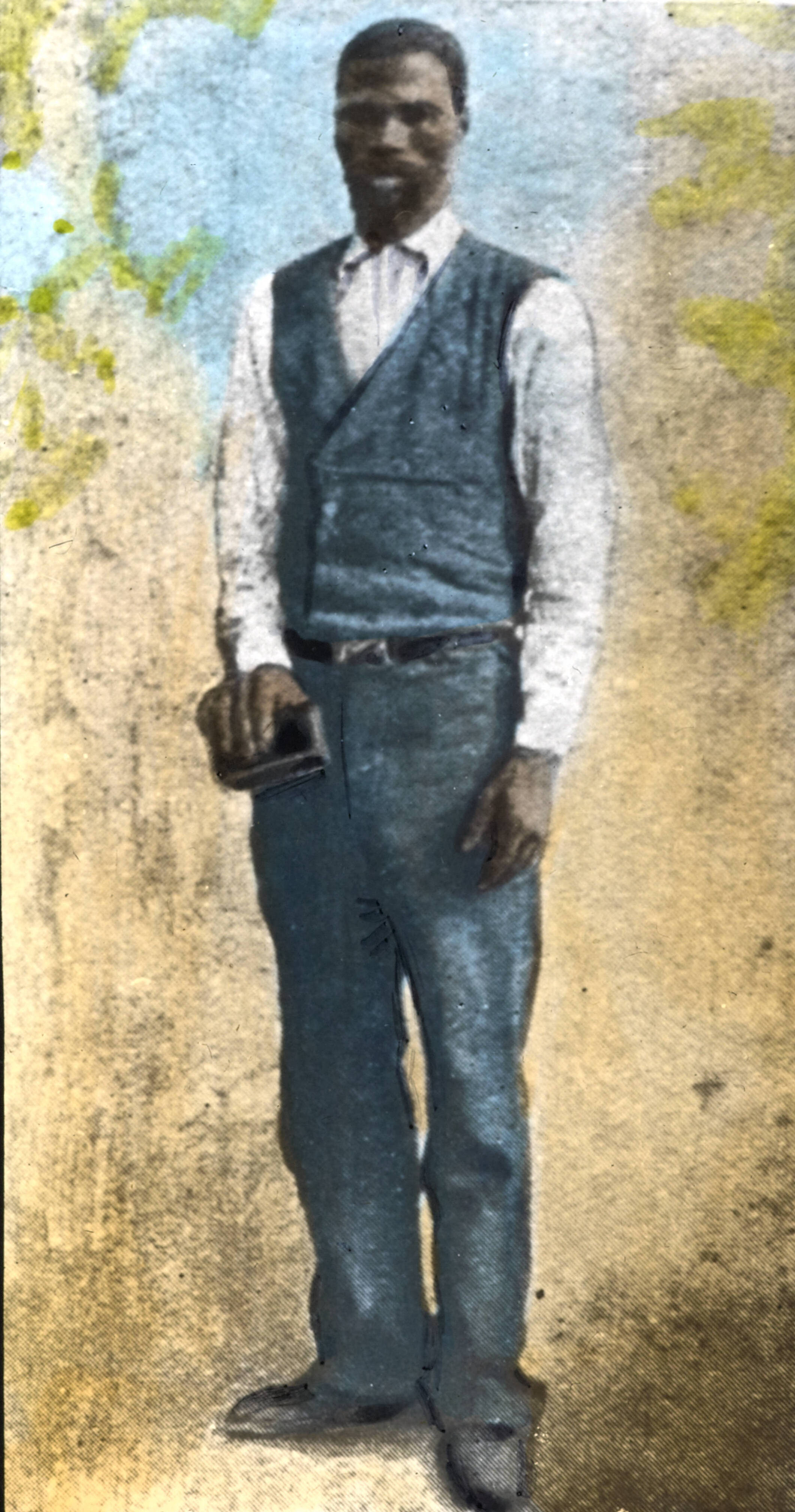
- Born: 1846
- Died: June 4, 1886 (aged 39–40)
- Education: Lovedale
- Occupation: missionary

William Mtusane Koyi (1846 – June 4, 1886) was a South Africa missionary in Malawi. He was born and trained in South Africa. He was sent with others to Ekwendeni where he was said to have been a "key figures in the evangelization of northern Malawi".

== Life ==
Koyi was a Xhosa, born in 1846 in the village called Thomas River in the Cape Colony. He became a Methodist and he was trained at the Lovedale mission station from 1871 to 1876. In 1876 he was one of four African born missionaries who volunteered to work at the Livingstonia Mission. The first four were Mapassa Ntintili, Shadrach Mngunana, Isaac Wauchope and Koyi and they were joined later by another African named George Williams.

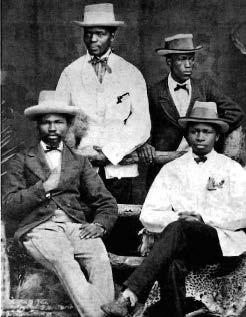
Left to right William Koyi, Mapassa Ntintili, Shadrach Mngunana, Isaac Wauchope. Four Xhosa missionaries who volunteered to serve among the Ngoni of present-day Malawi

Koyi became a missionary spending his time in northern Malawi initially at Cape Maclear and then north at Bandawe where he was able to speak and understand the Ngoni people as they had originally been from what is now South Africa. Kaning'ina was the site of a short-lived mission by Koyi and Robert Laws in 1878. In 1882 a new station was opened and Koyi was helping.

He was working in Ekwendeni with W. A. Elmslie. Elmslie appreciated Koyi's knowledge of the local people but he criticised him for being too close. Koyi was trusted by the local chief M’mbelwa. Koyi had been trusted by David Clement Scott but Elmslie was said to be jealous of the relationship between the South Africans and their prospective converts. Elmslie distrusted George Williams who was another Lovedale trained evangelist who enjoyed the trust of the local people.

Others saw Koyi as Elmslie's interpreter and right-hand man and they wanted to know who would take over from him when he died.

== Death and legacy ==
Koyi died in 1886 of tuberculosis. On his deathbed Elmslie told Koyi that M'Mbelwa had agreed that the missionaries were to be allowed unrestricted access to teach and preach to his subjects. Koyi is described as one of the "key figures in the evangelization of northern Malawi".

In the year that he died Elmslie published the first book in the Ngoni language in 1886 titled Izongoma zo ‘Mlungu, which included hymns and tracts. He later published a translation of St Mark's gospel in Ngoni and books on the Ngoni language.
