= T. Jack Thompson =

- Born: 16 February 1943
- Died: 10 August 2017 (aged 74)
- Occupation: Scholar of missions
- Known for: History of missions and African Christianity
- Spouse: Phyllis

Academic work
- Discipline: Missiology, African Christianity
- Institutions: Selly Oak Colleges, University of Edinburgh, University of Livingstonia

T. Jack Thompson (16 February 1943 – 10 August 2017) was an Irish mission historian and scholar of African Christianity.

== Biography ==
After studying history at Queen's University Belfast, Thompson taught history and religious education at Regent House School in Newtownards. Thompson and his wife Phyllis first travelled to Malawi as missionaries of the Presbyterian Church of Ireland in 1970. He later developed an academic interest in the study of missions history and Christianity in Africa.

Thompson returned to the United Kingdom and completed his PhD studies at the University of Edinburgh in 1980, on the subject of Free Church of Scotland missionary Donald Fraser. He taught mission studies in the Selly Oak Colleges in Birmingham, before taking up a post in the 1993 in mission studies at New College, University of Edinburgh. It was in the latter institution that, from 2005 to 2008, he served as the director of the Centre for the Study of Christianity in the Non-Western World and edited the journal Studies in World Christianity. During his time in Scotland, he became a leading figure in relations between Scotland and Malawi, including through the Scotland Malawi Partnership. Ahead of his retirement from the University of Edinburgh, Thompson travelled back to Malawi and was bestowed the Ngoni name Jabulani Jere. He was an elder in St Andrew's and St George's West Church, Edinburgh.

After retiring from Edinburgh in 2008, he served a year as Vice-Chancellor of the University of Livingstonia and was later an Honorary fellow at the University of Edinburgh.

Thompson died of cancer on 10 August 2017 in the Marie Curie Hospice, Edinburgh, and services were held on 31 August 2017. His remains were buried in full Ngoni warrior regalia at Njuyu CCAP mission in Ekwendeni, Mzimba on 16 January 2018.

== Works ==
- Thompson, T. Jack (1995). Christianity in Northern Malaŵi: Donald Fraser's Missionary Methods and Ngoni Culture. Leiden: Brill. ISBN 90-04-10208-6.
- Thompson, T. Jack (2000). Touching the Heart: Xhosa Missionaries to Malawi, 1876-1888. Pretoria: University of South Africa. ISBN 978-1-86888-140-6.
- Thompson, T. Jack (2007). Ngoni, Xhosa and Scot: Religious and Cultural Interaction in Malawi. Zomba, Malawi: Kachere Series. ISBN 978-99908-87-17-4.
- Thompson, T. Jack (2012). Light on Darkness? Missionary Photography of Africa in the Nineteenth and Early Twentieth Centuries. Grand Rapids, MI: Wm. B. Eerdmans Publishing. ISBN 978-0-8028-6524-3.
