= George Simeon Mwase =

George Simeon Mwase (c. 1880–1962) was a government clerk and later businessman and politician in colonial Nyasaland. He became politically active in the 1920s under the influence of the ideas of Marcus Garvey and his "Africa for the Africans" movement, and was instrumental in founding the Central Province Native Association in 1927. Mwase joined the Nyasaland African Congress (NAC) in 1944, soon after its formation, and later participated in its executive. By the late 1950s, the gradualism of Mwase and many of his contemporaries was rejected by a younger generation of more radical NAC members. He was marginalised and left the NAC and became a supporter of the Federation of Rhodesia and Nyasaland.

Today, Mwase is probably best remembered as the author of a document later edited and published by Robert I. Rotberg in 1967 as "Strike a Blow and Die". This was an English translation of his 1932 essay comparing race relations in Nyasaland at the time of the Chilembwe uprising and the early 1930s, but it is most noteworthy for its second-hand account of that uprising and the motivation of John Chilembwe. Its authenticity and conclusions have been questioned by other scholars.

== Early life and family ==
George Simeon Mwase, a member of the Tonga people, was born in the Nkhata Bay district in the north of what is now Malawi, probably around 1880, although no exact birth record exists for him. He received an elementary education at the Free Church of Scotland (1843–1900) mission at Bandawe and possibly a higher level if education at the Overtoun Institute at Livingstonia, Malawi, another Free Church mission, although the record of this is unclear.

His elder brother, Yesaya Zerenje Mwase (born ca. 1870) was definitely educated in the Overtoun Institute and became one of the first three African United Free Church of Scotland ministers to be ordained in Nyasaland in 1914. Yesaya later quarreled with this missionary-controlled church and, in 1933, founded the Blackman's Church of Africa Presbyterian.

George Mwase was engaged as a Nyasaland government postal clerk in 1905, resigning in 1906 to go to work for the Northern Rhodesian government. He returned to Nyasaland in 1920, where he worked for four years as a government tax clerk. In 1924, he opened a store in Lilongwe but this business later failed, and Mwase became bankrupt in 1930. In the same year, he re-entered government service as a clerk in the District Commissioner's office in Blantyre but in 1931, he was convicted of embezzlement and jailed for 16 months in Zomba jail.

== Political activity ==
From the time of his return to Malawi in 1920, Mwase was politically active and influenced by the ideas of Marcus Garvey, coming to the notice of the colonial police in 1926 for receiving copies of "Negro World", a publication published by Garvey's Universal Negro Improvement Association and African Communities League that was banned in Nyasaland. In 1927, Mwase and James Ralph Nthinda Chinyama founded the Central Province Universal Native Association, which was forced to drop the word "Universal" from its title as a condition of government registration.

After his release from prison, Mwase initially returned to the Lilongwe area but was later required to live in Chinteche in the Nkhata Bay district under a government order restricting him to his district of origin before again returning to the Lilongwe area in 1936, where he started another business venture. He also became active again in the Central Province Native Association, which from 1943 became a constituent part of the Nyasaland African Congress. Mwase joined the Nyasaland African Congress in 1944, and was a member of its executive committee in the late 1940s and early 1950s, strongly opposing the creation of the Federation of Rhodesia and Nyasaland. However, later in the 1950s Mwase's gradualism and deference to the colonial authorities alienated the new generation of activist nationalist leaders, and he left the party, becoming a supporter of the Federation. In 1959, he prepared a memorandum for the Devlin Commission rejecting a rapid transition to independence and, in the Nyasaland general election, 1961, he stood as a candidate for the United Federal Party, which supported Federation, in the Dedza district. He died on 3 August 1962

== "Strike a blow and die" ==
=== Origin ===
Robert Rotberg discovered a typescript entitled "A Dialogue of Nyasaland Record of Past Events, Environments & the Present Outlook within the Protectorate" in the Nyasaland Archives in 1962, shortly before Mwase's death, however, Rotberg never had the chance to meet nor interview him. Rotberg edited the document, added an introduction and notes and published it as "Strike a Blow and Die: A Narrative of Race Relations in Colonial Africa" in 1967, revising the introduction and notes in a 1970 edition of the book.

Although Rotberg surmises that Mwase wrote a draft of the first part of his work, an account of Chilembwe's rebellion, while in Zomba jail where he was imprisoned in 1931–32, Mwase himself indicates he completed the work in 1932, and that he wrote at least the second part after his release. A complete manuscript, including both the account of the uprising and a discussion of then-current race relations, written in Chinyanja, was prepared for an essay-competition sponsored by the Institute of African Languages and Cultures, London in late 1932. The typescript Rotberg discovered appears to be an English translation of this essay, typed by someone else and sent to a senior official in the colonial administration in January 1933.

Mwase never met John Chilembwe and was in Northern Rhodesia during and in the aftermath of the rebellion. Rotberg suggests that he obtained details of the uprising from Wallace Kampingo, one of Chilembwe's lieutenants who, after 17 years' imprisonment, was released from Zomba jail in July 1932, shortly before Mwase's release.

Rotberg's suggestion is credible, particularly as Mwase's account gives considerable prominence to Kampingo's actions during the uprising and its aftermath. However, Mwase did not name his informant, and the copy of "Negro World" Mwase received in 1926 was provided by Issa Lawrence Macdonald, who had also taken part in the Chilembwe uprising, so Macdonald may be an additional or alternative source. Rotberg also mentions Andrew Mkulichi, another of Chilembwe's followers, and oral traditions as possible sources.

=== Authenticity and accuracy ===
The often lengthy speeches quoted, some embellished with Latin quotations, said to have been made by Chilembwe and his writings may be Mwase's productions rather than an accurate recollection by his supposed informant 17 years after the event. However, in two cases where there are other indications of what Chilembwe said, Mwase gives a simplified and possibly distorted, but not wholly inaccurate account of them.

The first is the letter that Chilembwe sent to the Nyasaland Times in January 1915, which the censor deleted and was never published by that newspaper. This deplored African deaths and injury in a war started by Europeans in which Africans had no interest. Mwase's short paraphrase of the letter reflects this broad sentiment, adding that Chilembwe said the government should recruit white settlers instead of Africans. Secondly, Phiri quotes information that Chilembwe sent out his forces on 23 January 1915 saying, "You are going to fight as African patriots…I am not saying that you will win the war and then become kings…some of us will die on the battlefield and leave behind widows and orphans, but they will be a free people. Our blood will be worth something at last." Mwase, in a much longer record, mentions Chilembwe saying "You are all patriots. … I do not say that you are going to win the war at all …" and later "You must not think that with that blow, you are going to become Kings …" However, between these sections, Mwase repeats what he claims was said at an earlier meeting of 3 January 1915.

According to Mwase, on 3 January 1915, Chilembwe and his main followers "decided to strike a blow, or else they should ask to be buried alive". Chilembwe also (Mwase claims) said, after referring to John Brown, "Let us strike a blow and die, for our blood will surely mean something at last". Based on this report, Rotberg believed that Chilembwe sought martyrdom, as he was in a state of depression as a result of African casualties in the East Africa campaign. The phrase, "strike a blow and die" is repeated several times as an alleged quotation from Chilembwe's addresses, but it has not been recorded elsewhere and it conflicts with the actual course of the uprising, where several of those chosen as leaders stayed home and many followers scattered and fled once troops appeared.

The discussion at the 3 January 1915 meeting and an earlier one in December 1914 are the main bases for Mwase's belief that Chilembwe and his principal followers knew when planning the uprising that it would result in failure and their deaths, and he compares Chilembwe's fate to that of John Brown and Roger Casement. However, Chilembwe took considerable care preparing for the uprising, even if he showed an understandable lack of capacity for detailed military planning, and he was also let down by many of his main collaborators, mission-educated small landowners, who failed to act decisively, or act at all in one case. When it was clear the uprising had failed, he and several of his lieutenants attempted to flee to Mozambique, which calls their seeking martyrdom into question.

To the extent that Mwase believed John Brown knew he had no chance of success and was prepared to die as an explanation of Chilembwe's motivation, he was mistaken. A detailed report of Brown's interrogation stated that he went to Harpers Ferry for the sole purpose of waging a successful war, for which he believing his resources were sufficient, intending to arm slaves with captured weapons and win that war within a hundred days.

The rest of Mwase's account can be divided into an account of Chilembwe's ancestry and education and his comments on race relations in Nyasaland in the 1930s. Mwase devotes seven pages to asserting that, through his mother, Chilembwe belonged to the Chewa people, in particular to the Phiri clan, to which the Kalonga chiefs of the Maravi kingdom had also belonged. However, other sources assert that his mother was a Mang'anja woman, possibly a slave, and Chilembwe always regarded himself as a member of his father's Yao people.

Mwase also deals with race relations, the law and prisons, noting the improvement in the situation of Africans since 1915. Rotberg speculates that Mwase exaggerated the improvements for a more favourable response, but Price regards it as an early sign of Mwase's later deference to authority.

=== Reaction ===
George Shepperson, whose help Rotberg acknowledged, accepted the general accuracy of Mwase's account of the uprising, despite his colourful and dramatic language and considered it an important addition to knowledge of Chilembwe and his followers. However, he questioned Mwase's suggestion that Chilembwe had no hope of success. This was probably the most favourable response, but the reviews of Atmore and Price already mentioned were broadly favourable, although both questioned how accurate was the recollection of Mwase's informant after 17 years and how much was added by Mwase. McCracken also doubts Mwase's accuracy about Chilembwe but valued the light his work threw on the ideas and attitudes of an educated African in the 1930s.

The strongest opposition, both to Mwase's account and Rotberg's interpretations based on it, comes from the Lindens. They regard Mwase as opposed to Christian missionaries, and speculate that he likened Chilembwe to his own distorted image of John Brown, gained through reading Garveyite literature in the 1930s, rather than from anything his prison informant had told him. They therefore regard his account of the uprising as thoroughly unreliable. They also accuse Rotberg of being too ready to accept Mwase's account, to use it to make Chilembwe's psychology central to the revolt and to ignore the centrality (in their view ) of Chilembwe's millenarian beliefs.
