= Helen Nyirenda Kaunda =

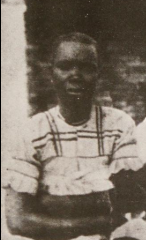
- Died: 1972
- Spouse(s): David Julizya Kaunda
- Children: Kenneth Kaunda

Helen Jengwera Nyirenda Kaunda (c. 1885 – 1972) was a Zambian educator and mother of Kenneth Kaunda, the first president of Zambia. She was the first African woman to teach in colonial Zambia.

== Life ==
Nyirenda was born around 1885 in Chisanya, a village near Ekwendeni in present-day Malawi. She was the daughter of Mugagana Nyirenda and Nya Nkonjera. In 1893, the family moved to Karonga, where she attended school.

Helen and her brother Robert Gwebe Nyirenda attended the Overtourn Institution in Livingstonia, a school created by Dr. Robert Laws and the Free Church of Scotland for the training of educators and missionaries. In 1900, she was one of the earliest female students at Overtourn. In 1904, she married another Overtoun student, David Kaunda, and they permanently settled in Chinsali in northeastern Zambia, in predominantely Bemba territory. During the next eight years, the Kaundas created 45 schools and religious centers serving over two thousand students. They had at least eight children before David Kaunda died in 1932, leaving Helen to raise the children.

Chafing at the racism of white missionaries, Kaunda became a follower of Alice Lenshina and the Lumpa Church.
