= Margaret Gray (disambiguation) =

Margaret Gray (1913–2010) was a British schoolteacher and headmistress.

Margaret or Maggie Gray may also refer to:

- Margaret Laws (née Margaret Troup Gray) (1849–1921), Scottish teacher, translator and missionary
- Maggie Kingsley (née Margaret Gray), Scottish writer
- Maggie Gray, English set decorator

== See also ==
- Margaret Grey
