= Alexander Caseby =

Scottish missionary and horticulturalist

Alexander Caseby (19 January 1898 – 14 May 1991), was a Scottish missionary who was known for serving as the head of forestry and horticulturalist for the Livingstonia mission, headed by Robert Laws, in Nyasaland from 1919 to 1933. While focused or horticulture, with his wife, he started a leper village in Malawi. He concentrated specifically in promoting western horticultural practices within the natives of Livingstonia and attempting to improve their agricultural resources.

== Early life ==
Alexander Caseby was born on 19 January 1898 in Lundin Links, Fife, Scotland, as the son of John Caseby, a bootmaker. He had older brothers John, James, David, William, a sister Netta, and a younger brother Angus. He fell sick to three illnesses in early life: croup, measles, and mumps.

His father owned a bootmaker's shop, which his family resided above. Caseby's family was religious and often attended Sunday church.

== Education ==
Caseby went to primary school at Dairsie. He later attended Harris Academy, which was at the time a selective secondary school in Dundee, Scotland. He received an average pass mark of 68% in his first year. The subjects he studied included horticulture, agriculture, forestry, and the bible. During the first world war, many of his teachers went to help with the war effort. Because he was still too young, at sixteen and a half years old, he delivered mail to pay for his academic studies and entrance exams.

== Personal life ==
Caseby married Williamina McFarlane on 30 April 1924. Together, they had 6 children, including Cyril, Margaret, Ronald, Sandy, and Grant.

== Military life ==
Caseby fought in the British army in France from 1915 to 1919. At the age of 17, despite failing the age limit, Caseby was enlisted as a gunner in Royal Field Artillery 1915. In early October 1917 Alexander Caseby was promoted to Corporal.

== Missionary service ==
At the age of 11, Caseby received leaflets about the tribes of Livingstonia, Malawi from his church leader Reverend Thomas Chrichton. From the leaflets he learned about Dr. Robert Laws, who inspired him to become a part of the Livingstonia mission in present-day Malawi. After returning to his home from the military, he was interviewed by Dr. Laws and his team to become a part of the Foreign Mission Committee. He was accepted and appointed as Assistant Horticulturist, Agriculturalist and Head of Forestry Department at Livingstonia.

During his journey as part of the Foreign Mission Committee, he had tested soil in 52 areas; discovered beds of nodular limestone; helped create twenty nursery beds; planted 500,000 seeds of all kinds of trees, shrubs, and coffee; started four blind men in string-making from sisal; and had two bouts of malaria. Together with his wife, Caseby erected an early "leper village".

== Return ==
Caseby fell ill and was diagnosed with cerebral malaria and sunstroke. He lost weight, from over 168 pounds to 99 pounds. Due to his condition he returned to Scotland and became the minister of a parish. He later became the minister of another parish in Newmills, Torryburn. He died on 14 May 1991.
