= Olipa (name) =

Olipa is a given name and surname. Notable people with the name include:

- Olipa Chimangeni, Malawian politician
- Olipa Myaba Chiluba, Malawian politician
- Rogers Olipa (born 2001), Ugandan cricketer
