= Yesaya Zerenje Mwase =

Malawian church minister

Yesaya Zerenji Mwasi
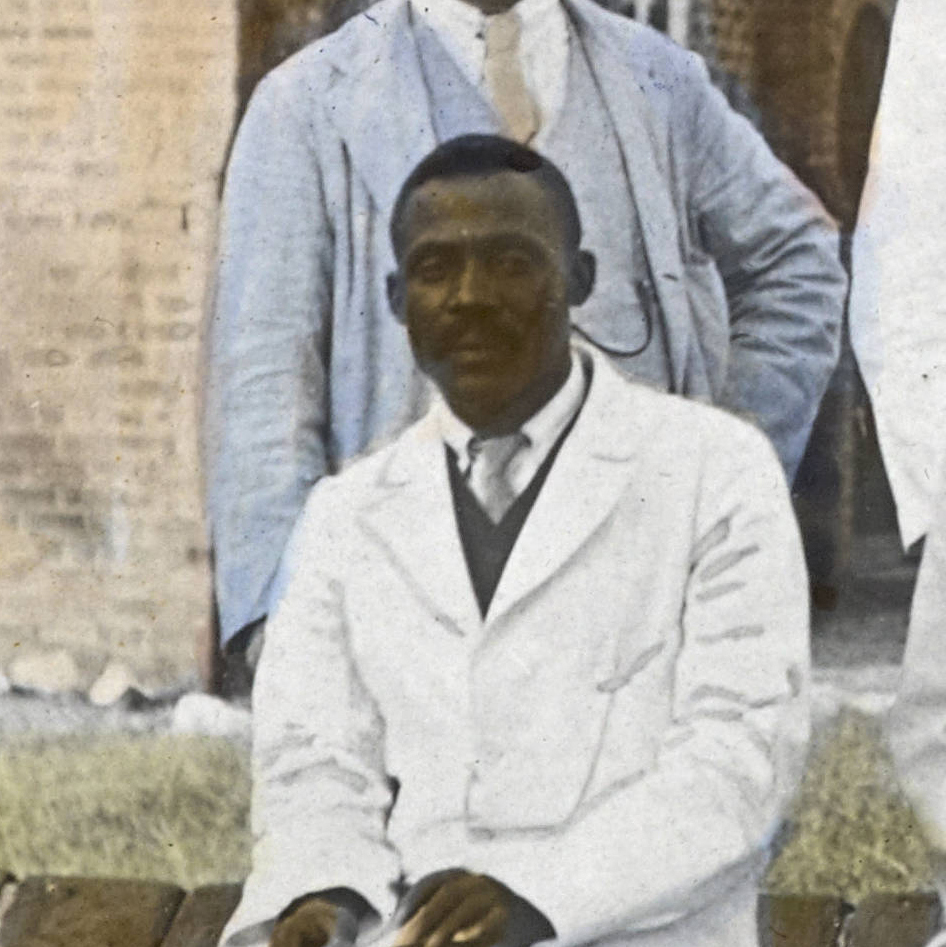
- Born: 1869 or 1870; Nkhata Bay District
- Occupation: Church minister
- Known for: founder of Blackman's Church of Africa Presbyterian

Yesaya Zerenji Mwasi or Yesaya Zerenje Mwase (born 1869 or 1870) was a Malawian church minister ordained in 1914 into the Church of Central Africa Presbyterian. In 1933 he was the founder of Blackman's Church of Africa Presbyterian.

== Life ==
=== Early life ===
Mwase (sometimes spelled Mwasi), of the Tonga people, was born in the Nkhata Bay District in what is now north Malawi, probably in 1869 or 1870. His father was a minor chief and his paternal uncle was Chief Ng'ondo whose Akapunda Banda village was near the Chiwandama falls.

His younger brother was George Simeon Mwase. Yesaya Zerenje went to the Livingstonia Mission school in Bandawe and he was baptised in 1895. He started a teacher training course at the Free Church of Scotland Overtoun Institute at Livingstonia mission in 1897, completing this in 1899 and becoming a teacher. He then began a theology course in 1902, which he completed in 1905 and became a licensed preacher in the United Free Church of Scotland.

=== Presbyterian minister ===
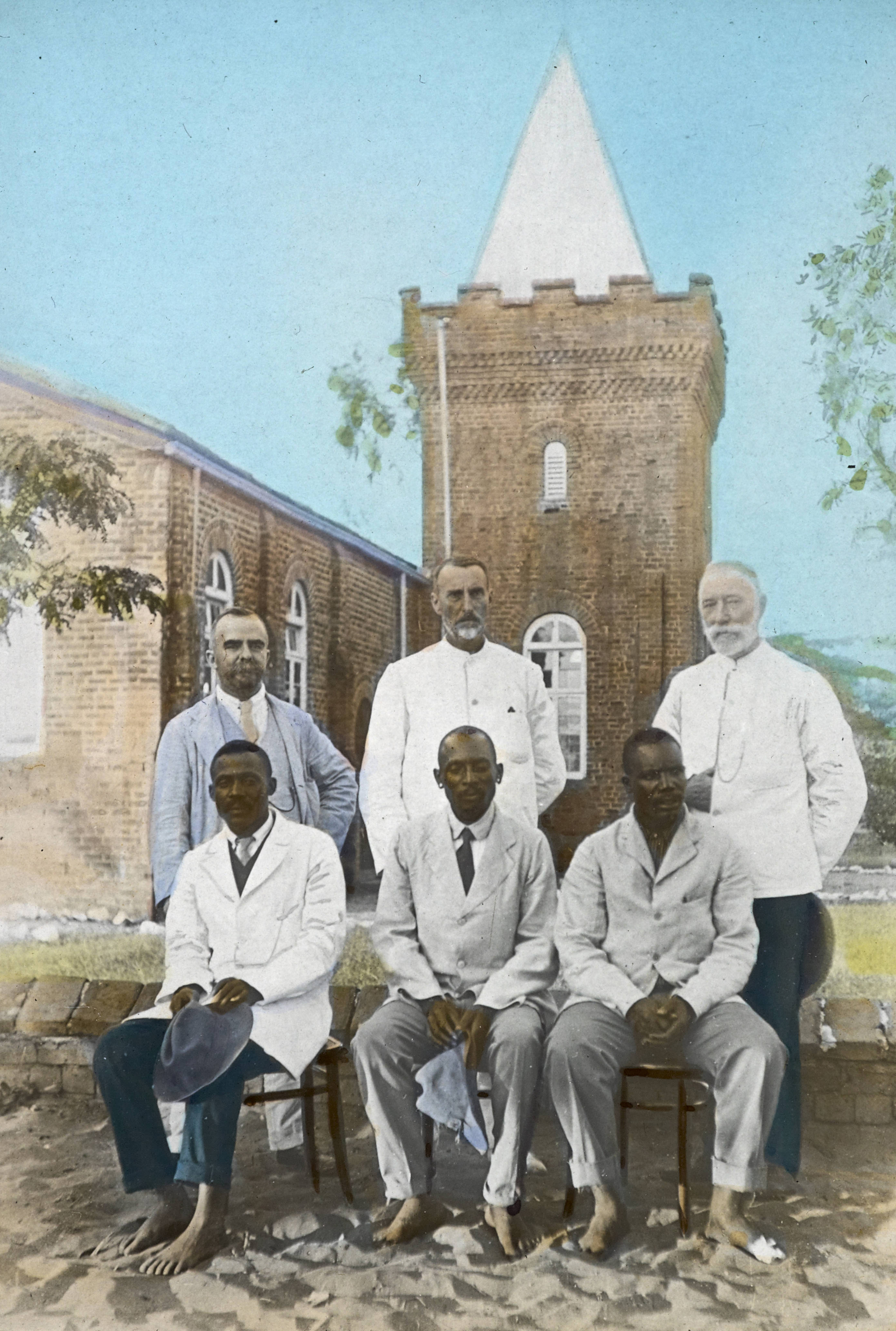
Missionaries at Bandawe, 1914, after ordination of the first three African clergy who are seated (L-R) Yesaya Zerenji Mwasi, Hezekiah Mavuvu Tweya, Jonathan P. Chirwa; Standing (L-R) A. G. MacAlpine, W. A. Elmslie, Robert Laws.

After a long probation as a licensed preacher, Mwase became one of the first three African ministers to be ordained in Nyasaland by a Presbyterian church in 1914. In 1916, he and the two other African ministers each became the pastor of a parish and were unsupervised by Scottish missionaries, and Mwase was chosen as the first African Moderator of Livingstonia Presbytery in 1918. His relationship with the church was difficult: he disagreed with the rigid application of its doctrines to newly-converted Africans. The first major clash occurred in 1915 when he baptized catechumens without the prior consent of his superiors. This was regarded as serious insubordination, and he was suspended from the ministry for a month.

=== Independent church leader ===
A more serious quarrel arose in 1932 when Mwase was again suspended after complaints about his disciplining of a church Elder led to a dispute between hom and a Scottish minister. Considering he had been dealt with unfairly, he left what had become the Church of Central Africa Presbyterian in September 1933 and founded the Black Man's Church of God in Tongaland. Mwase also complained about the "denaturalization and denationalization of the native Church" by non-native missionaries In the next year, concerned by the lack of African education in Nyasaland outside of European-controlled missions, he unveiled plans for a Nyasaland Black Man's Educational Society. This achieved little success because only a little money was available to provide schools or teachers, but he continued to operate several schools associated with his church for some years. In 1935 his congregation united with two other African initiated churches in the north of Nyasaland under the name of the Blackman's Church of Africa Presbyterian, although the three churches retained significant independence.

=== Political activist ===
In the 1930s and 1940s, Mwase was involved in politics through the Northern Province Native Association. Although the account of McCracken, the main source for Mwase’s activities, ends in 1940 and the exact date of his death is unknown, he provided evidence to the Abrahams Commission when it visited Nyasaland in 1946 and it is recorded that he died in the mid-1940s.
