= Blackman's Church of Africa Presbyterian =

The Blackman's Church of Africa Presbyterian is an independent Presbyterian denomination in Malawi. Each of its three founding pastors had been educated at the Livingstonia, Malawi mission and ordained as ministers of the Scottish missionary-led Presbyterian church based there. Although the Livingstonia mission was transferred to its present site in 1878, the missionaries were very cautious about ordaining African ministers. A theological course was established there in 1896 to train African ministers and the first two students completed it by 1900, but the first ordinations were not carried out until 1914. Of the students involved in the course between 1900 and 1914, only around half were ever ordained, on average, about ten years after completing the course, the other half were suspended, resigned or died. Donald Fraser, one of the leading Scottish missionaries, considered that the theological education of African candidates for ordination was insufficient without an "established christian character", which could only be proven through a lengthy probation. Although all three of the founders were ordained, all fell foul of the church establishment and left to form independent churches.

== The predecessor churches ==
Rev. Yesaya Zerenje Mwase, was born around 1870, was educated in the Overtoun Institute at Livingstonia, originally a Free Church of Scotland mission which, after that church split in 1900 became a United Free Church of Scotland mission. In 1914, he became one of the first three Africans to be ordained as United Free Church of Scotland ministers in Nyasaland. Mwase later quarreled with that church, believing he had been treated unfairly by a Scottish minister in a dispute over his disciplining of a church elder and, in 1933 he resigned from what had become the Church of Central Africa Presbyterian after the synods of the United Free Church of Scotland and Church of Scotland in Nyasaland had united. Mwase then founded the Black Man's Church of God in Tongaland. In 1935, Mwase's church based near Chinteche in the Nkhata Bay district formed a union with two other African initiated churches in the north of Nyasaland under the name of the Blackman's Church of Africa Presbyterian, or Mpingo Wa Afipa Wa Africa in the Tumbuka language. One of these churches was formed by Rev. Yafet Mkandawire, who had also studied at Livingstonia and been ordained as a Free Church of Scotland minister in 1918. He was deposed from the ministry in 1932 for involvement with preventive witchcraft, after which he founded the African Reformed Presbyterian Church in the Livingstonia area. The second was led by Rev. Charles Chidongo Chinula, another former Livingstonia student who had been ordained in 1925 but deposed from the ministry for adultery in 1930 and suspended from church membership. In 1934, as he had not been restored to the ministry, he formed an independent African church in the Mzimba district, which he named Eklesia Lananga ("Free Church"). Despite their theoretical union, in practice the three churches retained a good deal of independence.

A number of explanations have been proposed for the foundation of these independent African churches. One is that they arose because their founders believed that the European missionaries delayed the integration of Africans into full membership of the mission church and imposed strict discipline on their life inside and outside the church. Another view is that the high standard of teaching at Livingstonia predisposed its graduates to independence of thought and action, to reject some of the more rigid Free Church of Scotland doctrines and to question its attitudes to polygamy, traditional dancing and the boundary between traditional medicine and practices amounting to witchcraft and what Mwase referred to as the "denaturalization and denationalization of the native Church" by non-native missionaries.

== Yafet Mkandawire ==
Yafet Mkandawire (first name sometimes spelled "Yaphet") was an ordained minister of the United Free Church of Scotland and Church of Central Africa Presbyterian. In 1932 he left the latter, and became the founder of an African initiated church and teacher. He was active as a pastor and teacher until 1940s but there is no subsequent record of his activities.

=== Early life and ordination ===
Little has been published about Mkandawire’s early life, and his birth date and parentage are not recorded. It is known that he studied at Livingstonia mission and completed a theology course there, becoming a teacher and licensed preacher, although the date is not recorded. After a significant delay, he was ordained into the United Free Church of Scotland in 1918 and assigned to work in the Livingstonia congregations under the direction of Dr Robert Laws. In 1927, he became the first African treasurer of the Livingstonia presbytery and in 1928 was appointed to be pastor of two congregations on the shore of Lake Malawi, near Chilumba.

=== Suspension from the missionary church ===
Although Mkandawire had 14 years of unblemished service, in 1932 he was, accused of taking phemba medicine as a safeguard against being poisoned, or possibly against witchcraft. The issue was not clear-cut as, although the church condemned the use of charms against witchcraft and dancing and drumming to cure spirit possession, it regarded the taking of traditional medicines as protection against disease or against snake-bite as foolish but not an offence against its moral code. However, as there was no clear distinction between poisoning using harmful substances and poisoning through witchcraft, phemba medicine could be regarded as a charm against witchcraft and, despite a significant minority of the investigating committee urging leniency, the majority voted to suspend him from the ministry

=== Independent church leader ===
The reversal of a suspension was by no means automatic and, within a month, Mkandawire left what had become the Church of Central Africa Presbyterian to found his own independent church, the African Reformed Presbyterian Church In 1935, this church united with two other independent African churches in the north of Nyasaland under the name of the Blackman's Church of Africa Presbyterian (Mpingo Wa Afipa Wa Africa in the vernacular) although the three churches retained significant independence. Unlike the leaders of the other two churches, Mkandawire did not become involved in politics.

As well as acting as its pastor to his congregation, Mkandawire achieved a significant degree of practical success in education. He opened a village school in the Chilumba area with himself and his son as teachers and, in 1936 this was awarded a small government grant which was renewed in subsequent years. In 1940, his church had a second minister and his two schools, which the government recognised as efficient, had two further teachers.

There is no record of Mkandawire after 1940.

== Charles Chidongo Chinula ==
Charles Chidongo Chinula (1885-1971) was a teacher, an ordained minister of the Church of Central Africa Presbyterian for which he composed a number of hymns, the founder of an independent African church and a committed nationalist politician, initially seeking an African voice in Nyasaland politics and later opposing federation with Northern Rhodesia and Southern Rhodesia. He retired from active politics around 1958 and in 1967 rejoined the Church of Central Africa Presbyterian but was not re-admitted to its ministry. Chinula was one of the leading pre-1960 African intellectuals in Nyasaland although, like many of his generation, he was later marginalised by younger, more radical politicians. He was also an outstanding preacher.

=== Early life ===
Charles Chidongo Chinula was born in 1885 in what later became the Mzimba district of Nyasaland and at first named Chidongo Chinula. His father, Gonthako Chinula, came from the Ngoni people but his mother Mpizwa Yaraweni Nyanjiko may have been from the Tumbuka people. At the age of eleven, he started school in Hora mission, close to his home and in 1900 transferred to Ekwendeni Mission for more advanced study. After a further two years, Chinula won a scholarship to the Overtoun Institute at Livingstonia, where he met Charles Domingo, who gave Chinula the first name of Charles. In 1907, Chinula qualified as a teacher and began teaching in Loudon Mission in Mzimba district.

=== Teacher and minister ===
While in Loudon Mission, Chinula opposed the efforts of the missionaries to suppress such elements of Ngoni culture as traditional dances but also acted as an evangelist and from 1918 expressed his wish to train for the ministry. He undertook theological training in Tanganyika and was ordained in 1925 in the Church of Central Africa Presbyterian, which had been formed from the merger of two Scottish missionary churches. During this ministry, Chinula composed over 20 hymns but also clashed with the church on its policy of refusing to educate the children of non-members of the church, or of church members who were in polygamous unions or otherwise offended its strict moral code, asserting the rights of African children to be educated.

=== Independent church leader ===
In 1930, Chinula was accused of adultery and, when he admitted this was true, was deposed from the ministry and suspended from church membership. In 1932, at the second attempt, his church membership was restored and he was re-employed as a teacher on a reduced salary. He petitioned the presbytery for restoration to the ministry but when by 1934, he had not been restored, he left to form an independent African church in the Mzimba district, which he named Eklesia Lananga ("Free Church"). In 1935 this formed a union with two other independent African churches in the north of Nyasaland under the name of the Blackman's Church of Africa Presbyterian but, despite their union, in practice the three churches retained a good deal of independence.

Chinula established a number of churches and schools in the Mzimba district but was hampered by a lack of external funds and the inability of parents to pay school fees. The Church of Central Africa Presbyterian refused to recognise his or the other independent churches, and it was only in 1947 that the schools began to receive a small government grant. However, his church and schools continued to exist until 1967, when Chinula approached the Church of Central Africa Presbyterian, offering to rejoin it and disband his independent church.

=== Political activist ===
In 1920, Chinula was the founding secretary of the Mombera Native Association, named after the former Mombera district (now largely within the Mzimba district), and in 1924 became a member of the Northern Province Native Association. When the Nyasaland African Congress was formed in 1944, he became chairman of the Mzimba district branch and a member of the national council. He was also a member of the advisory Northern Province Council. However, when the Nyasaland government introduced Indirect rule and M'mbewela was recognised as paramount chief of the Mombera (or M'mbewela) Ngoni, Chinula became his principal adviser and a member of the M'mbewela African Administrative Council. He was willing to work within the existing colonial framework rather than challenge it. His last political appearance was in 1958 when he welcomed Dr Hastings Kamuzu Banda on his return to Nyasaland.

After his retirement from politics, Chinula continued to preach, despite failing health until 1970. He died at his home at Sazu on 3 November 1970, aged 85.
