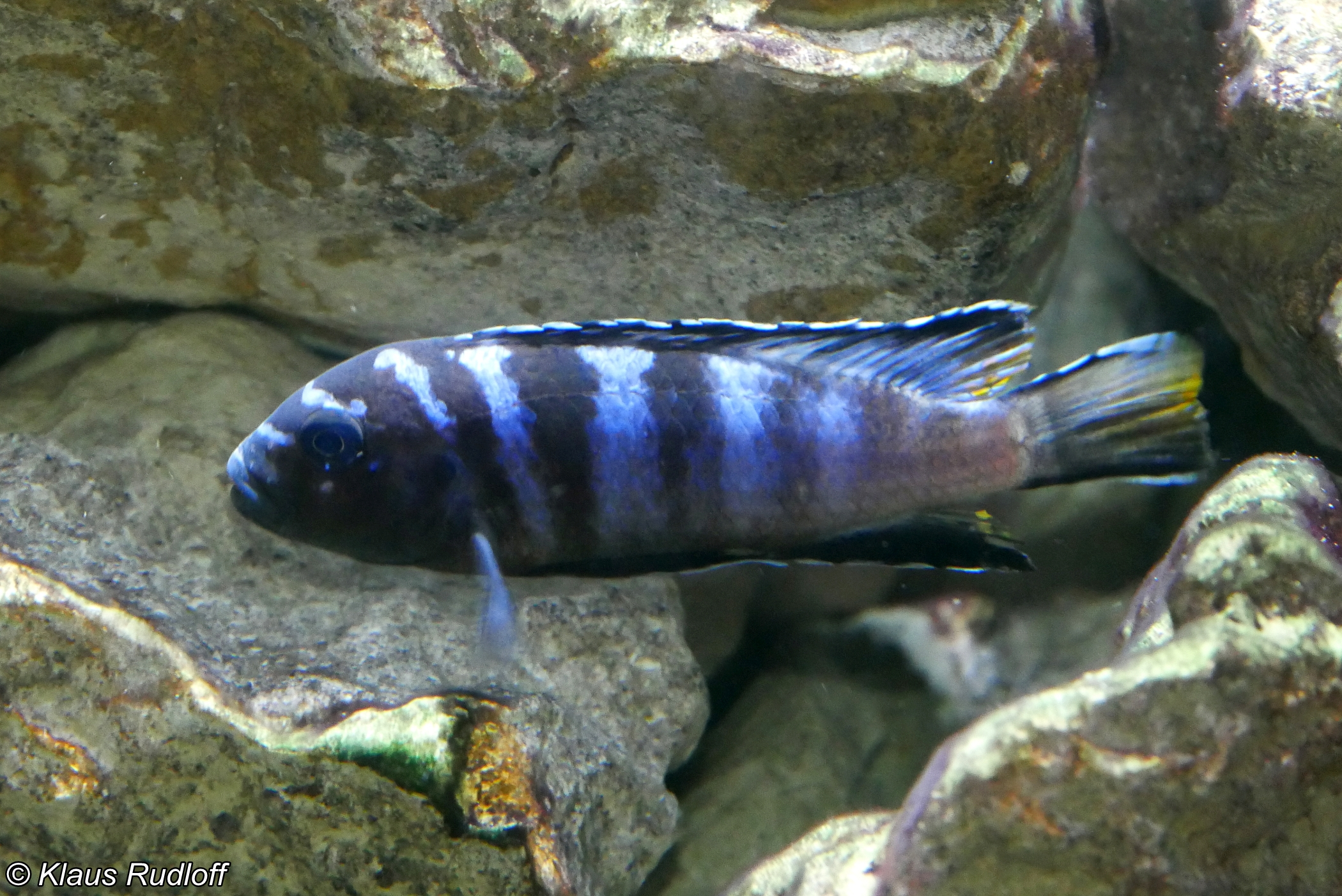

Conservation status
- Least Concern (IUCN 3.1)

Scientific classification
- Kingdom: Animalia
- Phylum: Chordata
- Class: Actinopterygii
- Order: Cichliformes
- Family: Cichlidae
- Genus: Gephyrochromis
- Species: G. lawsi

Binomial name
- Gephyrochromis lawsi Fryer, 1957

= Gephyrochromis lawsi =

Species of fish

Gephyrochromis lawsi is a species of haplochromine cichlid which is endemic to the northern part of Lake Malawi in Malawi and Tanzania. This species is normally found at deep levels, where the steep, rocky coastlines meet sand substrates. It prefers patches of sand at average depths of around 20 metres (66 ft). They feed mainly on loose aufwuchs. The males are weakly territorial and will defend their territories against intruders, while the females are solitary.

It may be threatened by overfishing by fishermen using beach seine nets, although it is a bycatch rather than one of the target species. It is sometimes collected for the aquarium trade.

The specific name honours the Scottish missionary Robert Laws (1851–1934).
