= Elizabeth Mantell =

Elizabeth Barbara Mantell
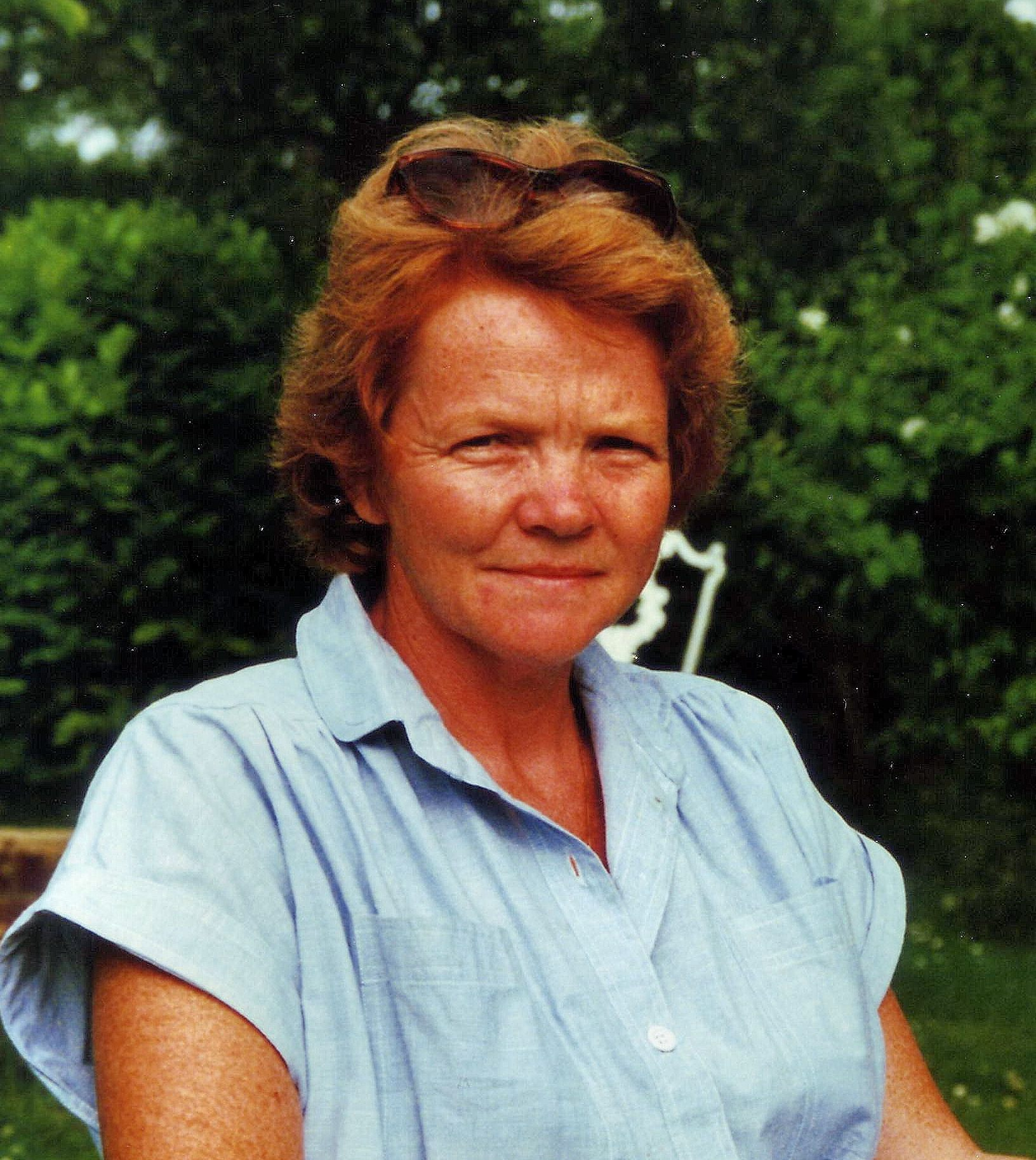
- Born: 24 June 1941; Kasama, Northern Rhodesia
- Died: 27 January 1998 (aged 56); Scotland
- Medical career
- Profession: nurse, midwife, medical missionary

Elizabeth Barbara Mantell (24 June 1941 – 27 January 1998) was a Scottish midwife and nurse who was born in Africa and spent much of her life as a medical missionary in Malawi, Africa. Her story is part of the Scotland-Malawi partnership and the strong relationship between the two countries, providing service for the under-serviced hospitals in Mulanje and Ekwendeni. Mantell was best known for her significant contribution to the development of the Ekwendeni Nurses' Training School in Malawi, practising holistic care, and being one of the pioneering female medical missionaries of the latter 20th Century.

== Early life ==
Elizabeth Mantell was born on 24 June 1941 in Kasama, Northern Rhodesia (Present-day Zambia). Her father, Henry Percy Mantell, was of English and Welsh background and worked for the African Lakes Corporation. During his second marriage to Barbara Ann "Bannie" Lyall from Macduff, Elizabeth and two other siblings were born - Harry (1939) and Helen (1944).

Mantell's family lived in Abercorn (present day Mbala) where her father was stationed from 1939 until his retirement in 1951. In 1946 after World War II the family returned to Macduff, in Aberdeenshire, Scotland. Her father went back to Northern Rhodesia four months later. She and her mother and siblings remained in Scotland before returning to Abercorn in 1947. After her father's retirement in 1951, Mantell and her family settled back in Scotland for much of her childhood. She was not an innate scholar, but did have a passion for hockey and always wanted to be a nurse as a young girl. She was a member of Macduff Girl Guides, sparking her love for the outdoors and gaining skills for her future endeavours in Malawi.

== Education ==
During her first trip to Scotland, Mantell completed a year in Macduff Infant School. Upon returning to Northern Rhodesia, she began her formal education as a student in her mother's home-school in Abercorn which grew to have about 20 students. After moving back to Scotland, she was later enrolled at Macduff Primary School and Banff Academy.

She later studied at St Colm's College in Edinburgh, the Church of Scotland's missionary training college, where she obtained the knowledge appropriate for being a missionary in Africa.

== Career ==
On 1 August 1960 Mantell began her nursing career at Aberdeen Royal Infirmary where she became a state registered nurse. In the next year she qualified as a midwife at Queen Charlotte's Maternity Hospital in London. While caring for her mother in Macduff in 1971, she worked as a district nurse. After further study, she qualified as a clinical tutor in midwifery and earned her community nursing qualification.

== Church involvement ==
Mantell focused a large part of her life on her religion and the Macduff Parish Church of the Church of Scotland. Mantell was an active member of the church, and her faith was an important part of her life. During her time at the Church of Scotland, Mantell took on the leadership role of ordination to eldership of Kirk Session, served as representative elder to Buchan Presbytery, and led teen Bible classes. Later during her missionary service Mantell was a part of the Nurses' Christian Fellowship. This was a prime example of the importance of holistic care to Mantell, as the group taught girls to appreciate their faith in addition to learning nursing skills.

== Personal life ==
Mantell was never married and had no children.

== Call to service ==
Mantell's start to missionary service was fuelled by two things: her love for Africa and her religious calling. After growing up as a young girl in Africa, Mantell had fond memories of her time there and was eager to return to her country of birth. Additionally, she felt the call of God while working in the Aberdeen Royal Infirmary, seeing it as her religious duty to aid the sick in Africa. She was accepted to work as a missionary Malawi and in 1966 at the age of 25, Mantell returned to Africa to begin missionary service.

== Missionary service ==
=== Work in Mulanje ===
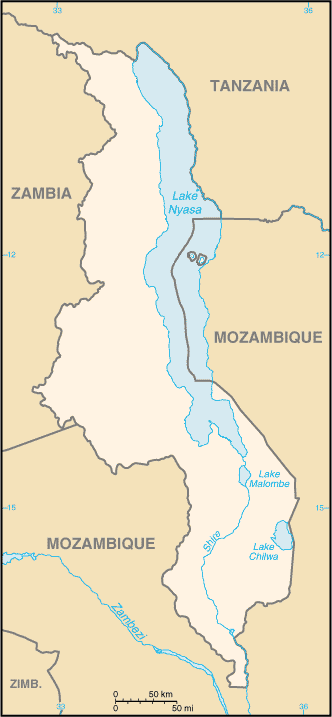
Map of Malawi in relation to Africa

Following a semester at St Colm's, in 1966 the Church of Scotland's Overseas Council sent Mantell to Mulanje, a town located in the southern region of Malawi. This area was in desperate need for nurses and had a hospital that had expanded to have multiple wards and over 60 beds. At first Mantell was unsure of the duration of her service remarking in the Evening Express,

"I do two years out there for a start. At the moment I don't know if I'll be staying on longer or not!"

From 1966 to 1971, Mantell was responsible for about 150 deliveries a month and thousands of women in various clinics. During this time, she served as midwifery sister, taught student nurses, and became fluent in Chichewa.

=== Interruption in missionary service ===
Mantell returned to Macduff in 1971 after the death of her father so that she could care for her mother who was becoming forgetful. Mantell ended up staying in Scotland for 10 years until her mother died in October 1980 at the age of 80. While on her leave of absence, Mantell remained in the missionary and academic circles through her academic talks. These talks included slides, visible in the National Library of Scotland, on her work in Malawi covering schools, church, nurses, and visits to Zomba.

=== Work in Ekwendeni ===
During 1983, at the age of 41, Mantell contacted the World Mission of the Church of Scotland and returned to Africa at Ekwendeni Mission Hospital in northern Malawi. She again worked in the maternity department of a hospital that served an area of 400 miles and a 45,000 person population. Many of Malawi's hospitals were severely understaffed and in need of her missionary work. During her many years as a missionary, Mantell became an active member of CHAM Training Committee, the Nurses Council of Malawi, and the Ministry of Health. In 1986, Mantell was integral in the opening and operating of a new hospital in Ekwendeni.

In 1991, through Mantell's efforts, the Ekwendeni Training School was upgraded from a school of midwifery to a full training school. Her work slowly evolved from dealing solely with patients to training student nurses as a Midwifery tutor. It was during this time that she developed a two-year course for students- the first year emphasised basic science such as anatomy, physiology, health, and hygiene, while the second year stressed midwifery. Mantell was able to witness Malawian staff earning key positions in the hospital system over time.

== Death ==
During November 1996, Mantell fell ill due to a tumour, and sought urgent medical care. This would turn out to be a terminal illness, sparking her return to Scotland for chemotherapy treatment at the City Hospital in Edinburgh and the Aberdeen Royal Infirmary. Due to her rapidly declining health, Mantell resigned from missionary work and was unable to return to Africa. Mantell died in Scotland on 27 January 1998.

== Legacy ==
Not only one of the few publicly recognized woman medical missionaries of her time, Mantell also pioneered and practiced holistic care before it was even a term, having concern of both the spiritual and physical when caring for patients. One of Mantell's most significant contributions to healthcare in Malawi was her training of nurses and developing the Ekwendeni nursing school. By educating Malawians and providing a foundation for future education, Mantell was able to create a sustainable way of aiding Africa and helping a great number of people. Today, the Ekwendeni Nursing School grants diplomas in Nursing and Midwifery to students completing three years of school and training. With over 300 students enrolled today, the school produced by Mantell's vision provides an opportunity for employment and increases the number of medically trained staff in Malawi every year. The current (2015) mission statement of the school aligns with Mantell's principles,

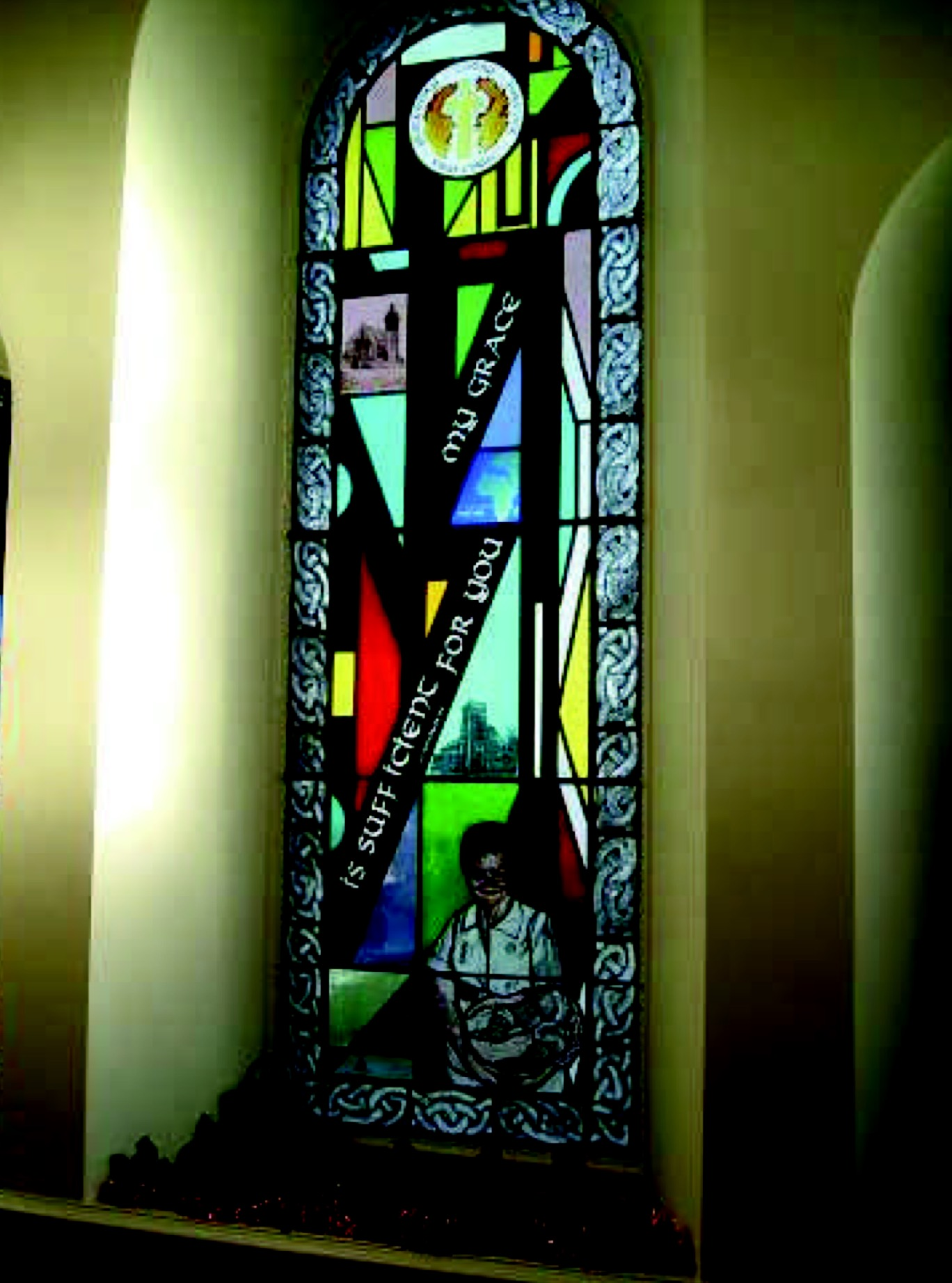
Memorial Window of Mantell in Macduff Parish Church

“Ekwendeni College of Nursing through excellence in teaching and learning environment shall train/educate and inspire students in the nursing and midwifery profession within the Christian principles.”

On 22 April 1998 the Macduff Parish Church dedicated a stained glass window to Mantell. This memorial, designed by Jennifer-Jane Bayless, consists of three windows and the focal point of Mantell holding a baby. Also on the memorial are images of Macduff Parish Church and Mulanje Mission Hospital, as well as the Saltire Cross and Malawi flag. The windows fuse new Celtic and African art. It includes the quote, "My grace is sufficient for you" from 2 Corinthians 12:9 of the New Testament, representing Mantell's method of practicing missionary work and providing inspiration to the title of her biography by David Randall, Grace Sufficient.

Mantell was a part of what became the Scotland-Malawi Partnership. Congregations in Scotland remember her mission, raising money in Macduff for a well in Ekwendeni.

== Bibliography ==
- Randall, David J. (2009). Grace Sufficient. Malawi: Kachere Books. ISBN 9789990887594.
