= University of Livingstonia =

Private university in Malawi

- Motto: Courage, Excellence and Confidence
- Type: Private
- Established: 2003
- Students: over 2,000
- Location: Livingstonia, Malawi; 10.613481452496824°S 34.10747653495042°E
- Colours: blue, white
- Website: unilia.ac.mw

The University of Livingstonia (UNILIA) is a university located in Livingstonia, Malawi. It was founded in 2003 and has grown to over 2,000 students located in three campuses. It offers undergraduate and graduate degrees. It is accredited by the National Council of Higher Education. The main campus is the Laws Campus in Livingstonia; a smaller campuses is the Ekwendeni Campusn in Mzimba District.

== History ==
The vision for the university was created by Robert Laws. Laws was a Scottish missionary who headed the Livingstonia mission in the Nyasaland Protectorate (now Malawi) for more than 50 years.

== Undergraduate Degree Programs ==
- Bachelor of Education in Science and Humanities
- Bachelor of Education in Information
- Communication and Technology (ICT)
- Bachelor of Science in Environmental Management
- Bachelor of Science in Public Health
- Bachelor of Science in Computer Engineering
- Bachelor of Science in Food Security and Nutrition
- Bachelor of Social Science in Development Studies
- Bachelor of Social Science in Human Rights
- Bachelor of Theology and Bachelor of Arts in Theology and Development

== Graduate Degree Programs ==
- Master of Arts in Theology and Religious Studies,
- Master of Arts in Theology and Gender Studies and
- Master of Arts in Theology and Development Studies.

== See also ==
- List of universities in Malawi
- Education in Malawi
