= Mzimba North East Constituency =

Malawian electoral constituency

- First-past-the-post constituency for the Parliament of Malawi
- District: Mzimba
- Region: Northern Region
- Major settlements: Ekwendeni

Current constituency
- Party: MCP
- Member: Catherine Gotani Hara

Mzimba North East Constituency is a constituency for the National Assembly of Malawi, located in the Mzimba District of Malawi's Northern Region. It is one of 13 constituencies in Mzimba District. It elects one Member of Parliament by the first past the post system. The constituency has 19 wards, all electing councilors for the Mzimba District. The constituency is currently represented by MP, Catherine Gotani Hara.

At the 2025 Malawian General Election Catherine Gotani Hara was the MCP's Deputy President. She took nearly 15,000 votes to win the seat with Edgar Tembo in second place.

== Members of parliament ==
Elections	MP	Party	Notes	References
2009	Catherine Gotani Hara	DPP	Multi-party system	
2014	Olipa Myaba Chiluba	independent	Multi-party system	
2019			Multi-party system	
2025	Catherine Gotani Hara	DPP	Multi-party system	
