= Bandawe Girls Secondary School =

Bandawe Girls' High School
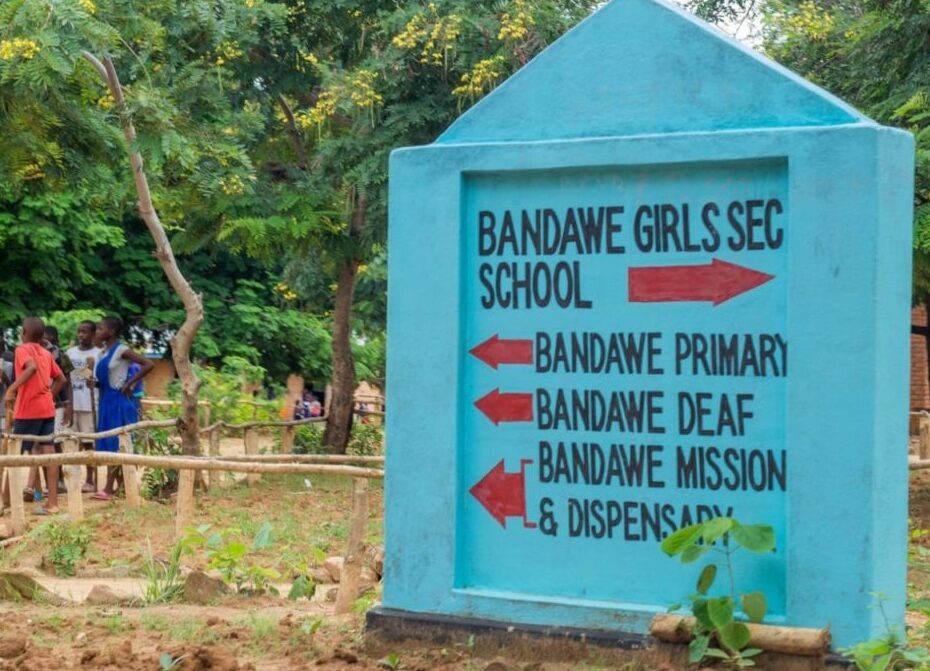

Location
- Bandawe; Malawi; 11.887889°S 34.158438°E

Information
- Established: 1997 (29 years ago)
- Principal: Moses M. Saka
- Website: Facebook

Bandawe Girls' High School is an all-girls secondary boarding school in Bandawe in northern Malawi. It was established in 1997.

== History ==
The school was founded in 1997 in Nkhata Bay District. It was established as a boarding school using facilities of the nearby primary school. Its first dedicated hostel was built with the support of the Mamie Martin Fund. The school has a close association with Mamie Martin. Her grave, and her daughter Margaret Sinclair's ashes are nearby. Mamie Martin inspired, and Margaret Sinclair established, the Scottish charity which has supported the education of over 750 girls at the school over the years. The KIND charity has also supported 60 students at the school.

The graduation rate for girls in Malawi is approximately half that of boys. Secondary education only became free in 2025, and families frequently prioritise the education of sons.

In 2014, the head of the school suspended all Form IV girls "indefinitely" on grounds of indiscipline, according to then-head teacher Mrs Msowoya.

In 2015, the new head teacher Benford Mwakayuni attended a ceremony at the Japanese embassy to receive a grant from the Japanese ambassador, Shuichiro Nishioka, witnessed by Malawi's Minister of Education, Science and Technology, Emmanuel Fabiano. The grant funded the construction of two new hostels for students. Each hostel accommodates 56 students, helping to ease overcrowding; as the time the school had 326 students but insufficient beds, and some students were required to share beds.

In 2024, the school had approximately 500 students.

== Organisation ==
The Livingstonia Synod provides education through a network of approximately 850 primary schools and seven secondary schools. The secondary schools include Bandawe Girls' Secondary School, Ekwendeni Girls' Secondary School, Robert Laws Secondary School, Karonga Girls' Secondary School, Elangeni Secondary School, Amazing Grace Secondary School, and Kapoka Secondary School.

== Notable alumni ==
Notable alumni include Thoko Chikondi, a photojournalist for UNICEF. She attended the school through a church-funded grant and was reportedly inspired to pursue journalism following a visit from the Malawi Broadcasting Corporation. Malumbo Mkandawire was at the school in 2014 and thanks to support from CamFed she went on to study agriculture at EARTH University in Costa Rica.

== School uniform ==
The school's uniform consists of two shades of blue.
