= Bandawe =

Bandawe Mission (aka 'Old' Bandawe)
- Village
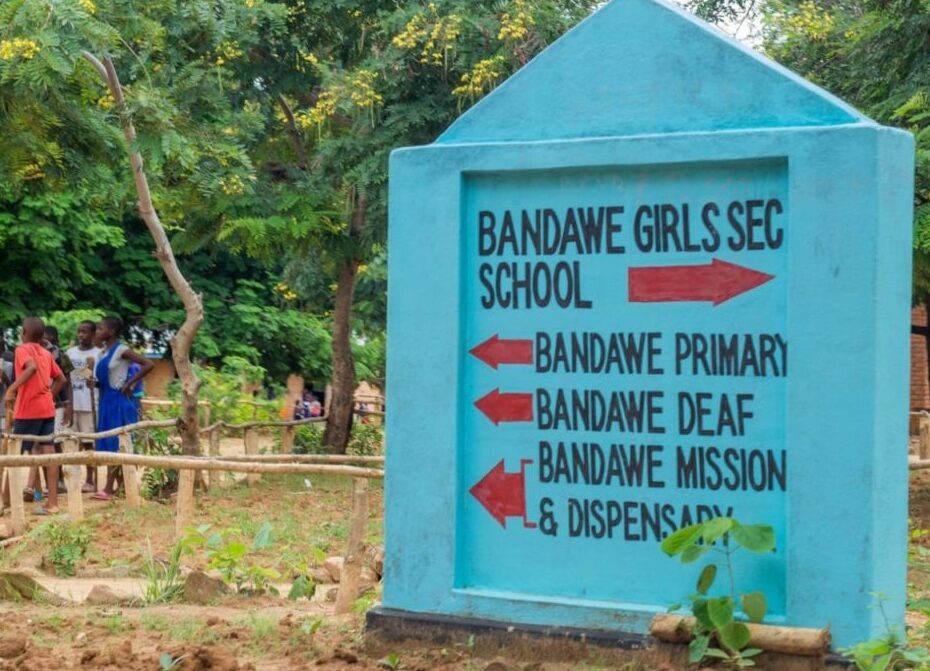
- Bandawe Schools (image by Malawi Scotland Partnership)

- Location in Malawi
- Coordinates: 11.921164°S 34.171857°E
- Country: Malawi
- Region: Northern Region
- Time zone: +2

Bandawe is a community in Malawi on the west shore of Lake Malawi. It is the site of one of the first Christian missions in Malawi, Bandawe Mission. This became the second location for Livingstonia Mission.

== Bandawe Mission ==
The Livingstonia mission established a small station at Bandawe in Tonga country in 1878 (location approx -11.921583, 34.175229). In 1881 the mission moved to Bandawe to escape the bad climate of Cape Maclear and bouts of malaria that struck the mission.

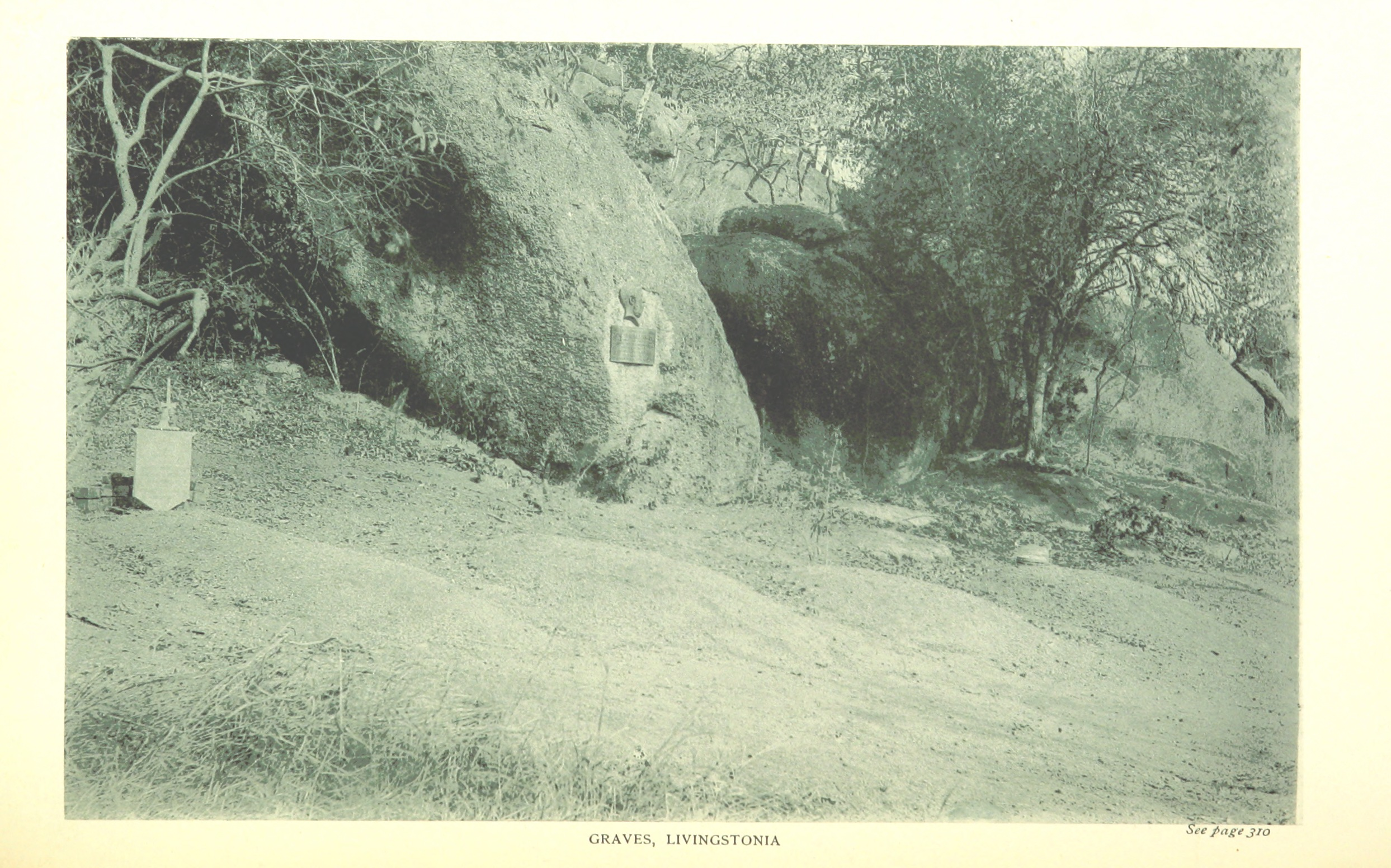
Graves at Livingstonia c. 1891 by Dr Johnston

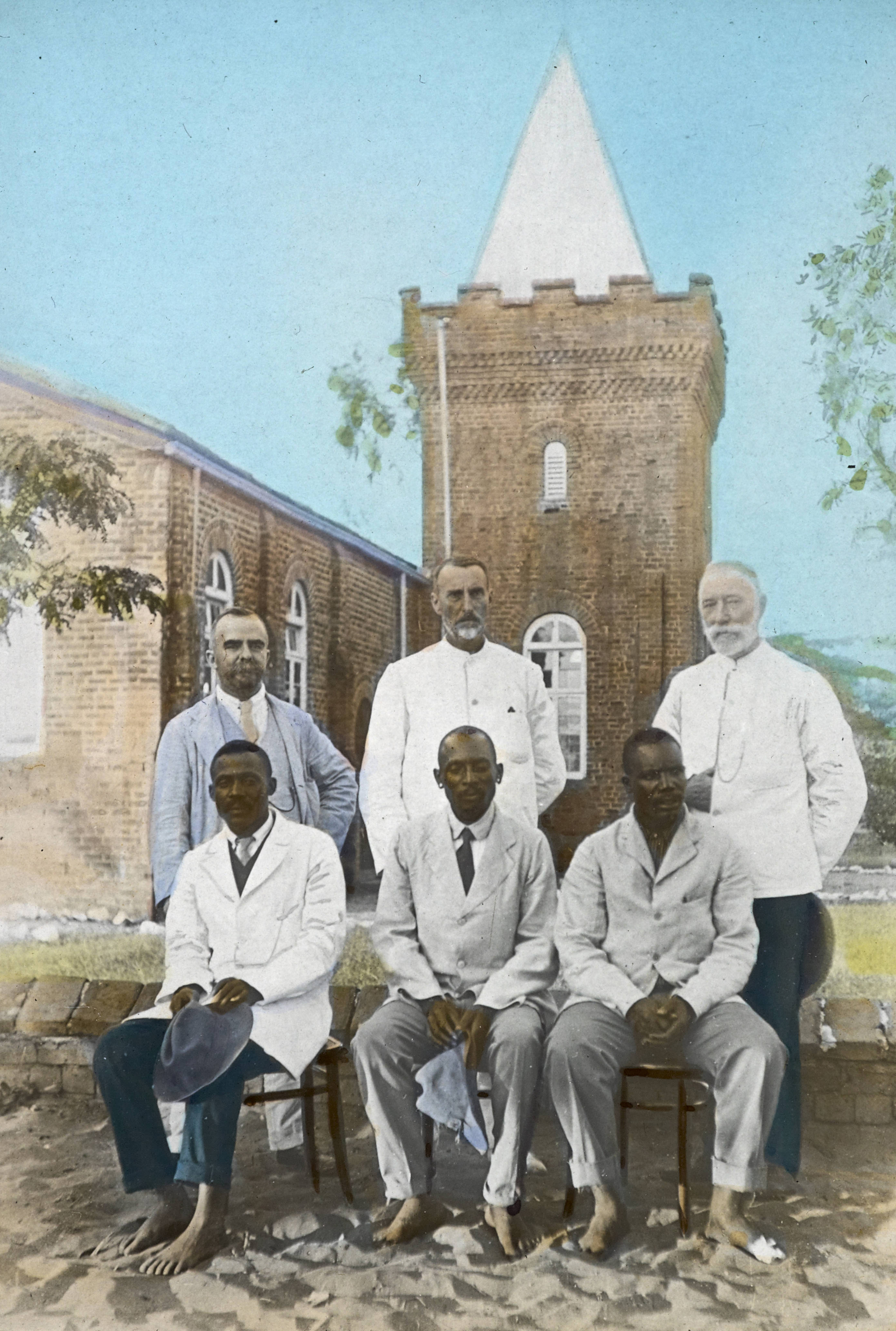
Missionaries at Bandawe, 1914, after ordination of the first three African clergy. Seated (L-R) Yesaya Zerenji Mwasi, Hezekiah Mavuvu Tweya, Jonathan P. Chirwa; Standing (L-R) A. G. MacAlpine, W. A. Elmslie, Robert Laws.

The photo of the graves is at the first Livingstonia near Cape Maclear and are still visible at approx -14.037001, 34.830356. In 1894 the mission moved once again from Bandawe to Kondowe, again for health reasons. The former mission is a historical site, the ruins include a cemetery.

Reverend AG MacAlpine was based in Bandawe with his wife Annie MacAlpine. He retired from Bandawe in 1914 having completed 21 years missionary service in Livingstonia. In that year the first world war started but before that the first three Africans were ordained in Bandawe on 18 May. They were Hezekiah Mavuvu Tweya, Jonathan Chirwa and Yesaya Zerenji Mwasi and no other Africans had been ordained in Livingstonia. This was a long awaited milestone as some felt that Africans should never be ministers however Alexander Hetherwick was in charge and he wanted to demonstrate his confidence. MacAlpine returned to Scotland where he was a minister until the mission fell short of volunteers and he again returned to Malawi.

In 1921, Jack and Mamie Martin arrived to be missionaries to Bandawe and later Ekwendeni. Mamie created classes for girls to be educated when parents were known for preferring to educate their sons. Mamie died in 1928, but her family later created the Scottish charity called the Mamie Martin Fund which subsidises the education of girls in northern Malawi.

== Education ==
Bandawe Girls Secondary School is a boarding school for about 500 girls is located here. Girls receive scholarships from the KIND charity and the Mamie Martin Fund.
