= Margaret Laws =

Scottish missionary in Malawi

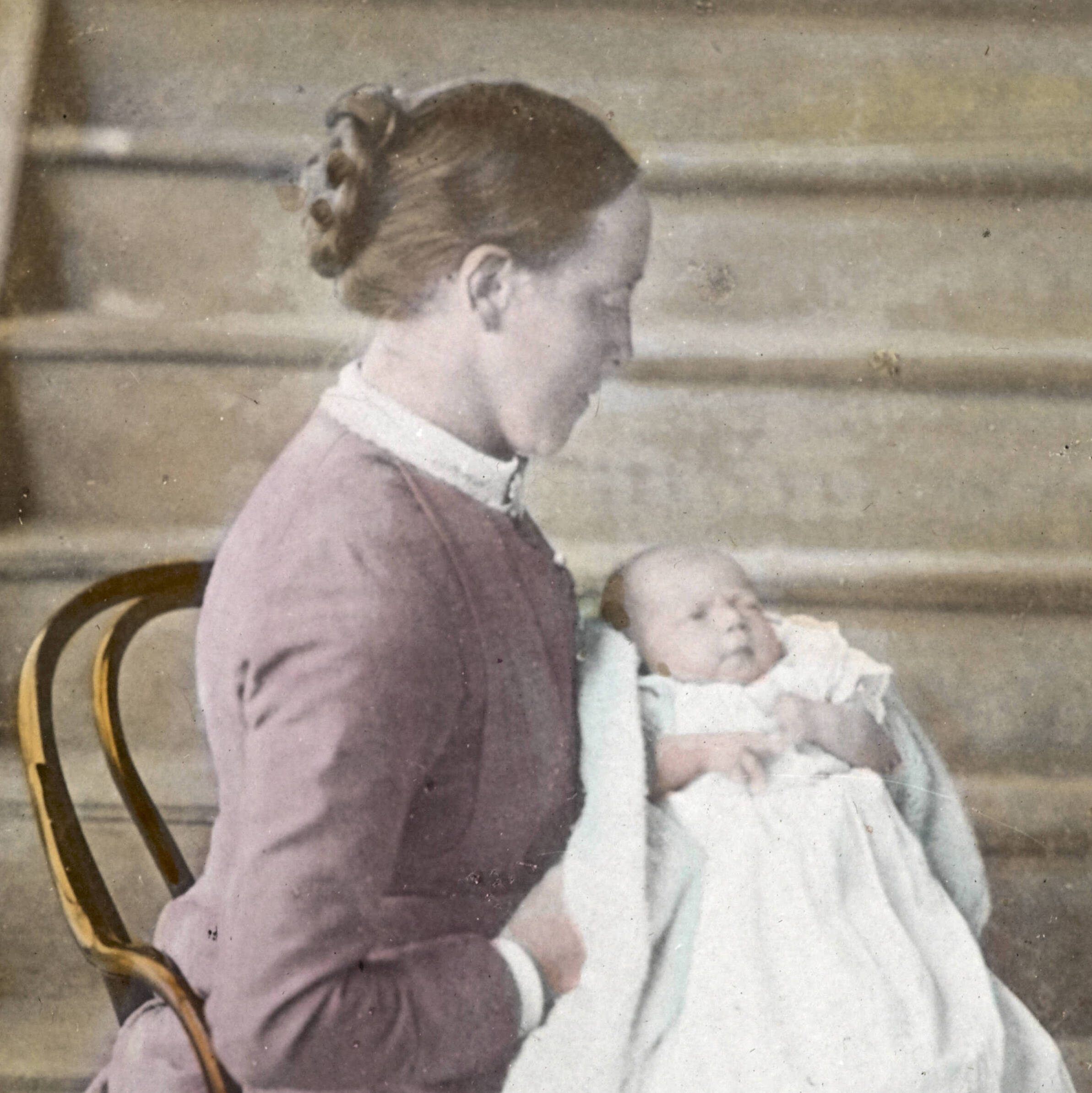
- from an 1886 lantern slide
- Born: Margaret Troup Gray; 4 February 1849; Aberdeen, Scotland
- Died: 17 September 1921 (aged 72)
- Known for: Scottish teacher, translator and missionary

Margaret Laws born Margaret Troup Gray (4 February 1849 to 17 September 1921) was a teacher, translator, and missionary, from Aberdeen. She concentrated on teaching, studying the Chinyanja language, and producing religious and educational material in that language. During visits to Scotland she was in great demand as a speaker.

== Early life ==
Margaret Troup Gray was born in Aberdeen on 4 February 1849. Her parents were Mary Gordon and Charles Gray, who was a clerk. She was the fifth of nine children and grew in a household where learning was encouraged. A dictionary and an atlas were kept at the ready on the family dinner table. She attended the Sunday school at St Nicholas Lane United Presbyterian church, run by Jane Melville. Gray was a childhood companion of Robert Laws. The two had volunteered together at Aberdeen's Shiprow Mission for the city's working youth.

Having trained and worked as a teacher, Gray became engaged to Robert Laws in 1875 and, after a long engagement while he became established as a medical missionary, they married in Africa in 1879. They had eight children, but only one survived—Amelia Nyasa Laws, born in 1886, was sent back to Scotland for her education at the age of eight. Amelia worked in Europe as a nurse during WW1. Margaret Troup Gray spent most of her 40 years at Livingstonia, Nyasaland (now Malawi), and returned to Scotland in failing health and died there.
