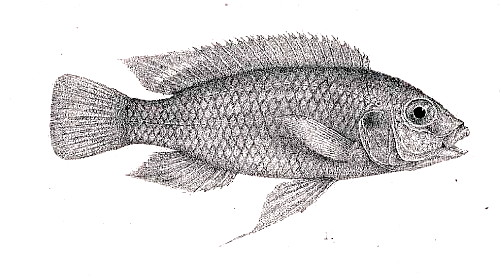

Conservation status
- Least Concern (IUCN 3.1)

Scientific classification
- Kingdom: Animalia
- Phylum: Chordata
- Class: Actinopterygii
- Order: Cichliformes
- Family: Cichlidae
- Genus: Gephyrochromis
- Species: G. moorii

Binomial name
- Gephyrochromis moorii Boulenger, 1901

Synonyms
- Tilapia moorii (Boulenger, 1901); Christyella nyasana Trewavas, 1935

= Gephyrochromis moorii =

Species of fish

Gephyrochromis moorii is a species of haplochromine cichlid. It is endemic to Lake Malawi, where it is found exclusively over open sand areas. It lives in small groups numbering between three and seven individuals. The males are not strictly territorial, but defend feeding sites from other males.

The specific name honours the English cytologist and biologist John Edmund Sharrock Moore (1870–1947).
