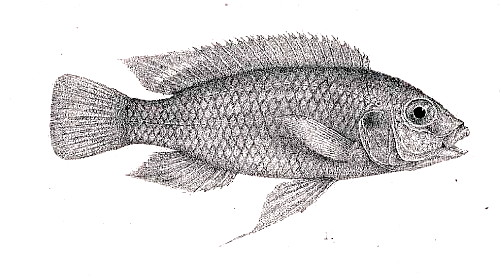
- Gephyrochromis moorii

Scientific classification
- Kingdom: Animalia
- Phylum: Chordata
- Class: Actinopterygii
- Order: Cichliformes
- Family: Cichlidae
- Tribe: Haplochromini
- Genus: Gephyrochromis; Boulenger, 1901

Type species
- Gephyrochromis moorii Boulenger, 1901

Synonyms
- Christyella Trewavas, 1935

= Gephyrochromis =

Genus of fishes

Gephyrochromis is a small genus of haplochromine cichlids endemic to Lake Malawi in east Africa.

== Species ==
There are currently two recognized species in this genus:

- Gephyrochromis lawsi Fryer, 1957
- Gephyrochromis moorii Boulenger, 1901
