= Margaret Gray =

Margaret Gray (1913–2010) was a British schoolteacher and headmistress, most notably serving as head of the Godolphin and Latymer School from 1963 to 1973.

The daughter of a minister, she moved from Scotland to London at age 11. She was schooled in Brighton, and educated at Newnham College of Cambridge University, and Smith College.

She started her teaching career in 1937 at Westcliff High School for Girls in Essex. She went on to head the history department of Mary Datchelor girls' school in Camberwell (South London). After World War II, she was made head of Skinners' Company's School for Girls. In 2002, her children's book, The Ugly Princess and the Wise Fool, was published by Scholastic. In 2004 a prequel The Lovesick Salesman was published. Both were illustrated by Randy Cecil.

== Personal life ==
Gray never married. She died in 2010.
