= Catherine Gotani Hara =

Malawian politician

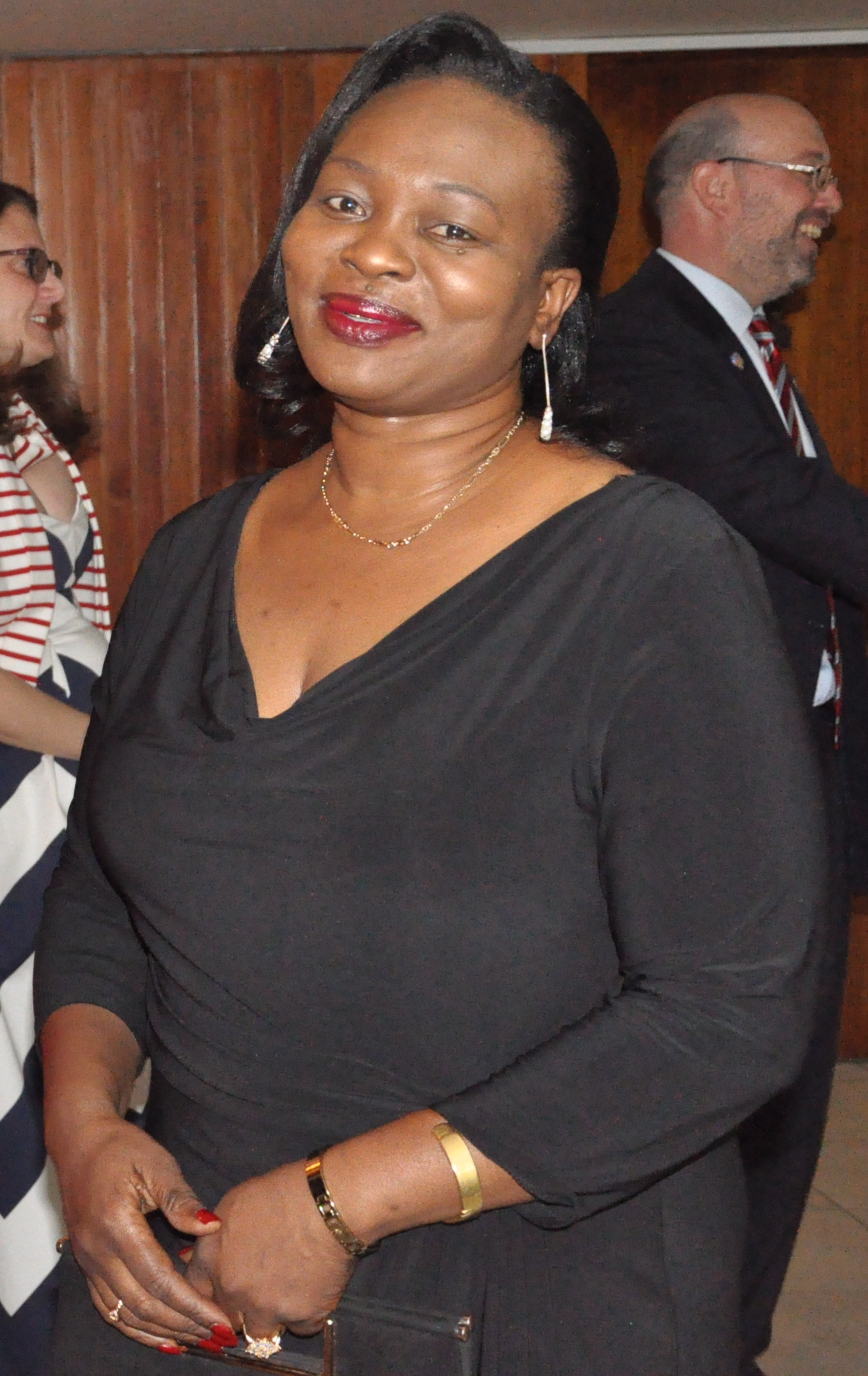
- Gotani Hara in 2019

Speaker of the National Assembly
- In office 19 June 2019 – 5 August 2025
- Preceded by: Richard Msowoya
- Succeeded by: Sameer Suleman
- Constituency: Mzimba North East

Personal details
- Party: MCP

Catherine Gotani Hara is a Malawian politician who served as Speaker of the National Assembly of Malawi between June 2019 and August 2025, the first woman to hold the position. She was one of the first MPs announced as re-elected in the 2025 election.

== Early life and education ==
Gotani Hara attended Kamuzu Academy, and has a Bachelor of Arts in political science from Chancellor College at the University of Malawi. While studying, she ran the university's wing of the Malawi Congress Party. From 1998 to 2000, she completed professional postgraduate training in International Development and Project Planning and Management Brighton.

== Career ==
Gotani Hara was a Programme Officer for the UK's Department of International Development, the first Malawian to be recruited to that level. She was responsible for the sustainable livelihood projects for both Mozambique and Malawi.

Gotani Hara was elected as the Member of Parliament for Mzimba North East in 2009, representing the Democratic Progressive Party.

Gotani Hara was the Deputy Minister of Transport and Public Infrastructure, Deputy Minister for Gender, and the Minister for Health in the Joyce Banda government. She represented the Malawi Head of State at a number of international events, and was the Chair of the Malawi delegation to the Climate Change Summit in Brazil. She is a board member of the Northern Region Water Board. After the death of President Bingu wa Mutharika in 2012, she publicly declared that it unconstitutional for members in the ruling DPP politburo to take over the presidency. She took a break from politics from 2014 to 2019.

Gotani Hara was re-elected in May 2019 representing the Malawi Congress Party (MCP), and on 19 June 2019, she was elected the first female Speaker of the National Assembly, at 97 votes to 93 against, defeating former deputy speaker Esther Mcheka Chilenje.

At the 2025 Malawian General Election she was the MCP's Deputy President. She took nearly 15,000 votes to win the Mzimba North-East Constituency. She spoke in November in Parliament of her support for the President's proposal to increase the Constituency Development Fund (CDF) from K220 million to K5 billion.
