= Olipa Myaba Chiluba =

Malawian politician

Olipa Myaba Chiluba is a politician in Malawi.

From 2014 to 2019 Chiluba represented Mzimba North East Constituency in the National Assembly of Malawi. Elected as an independent, Chiluba's term began on May 20, 2014. As MP she served as chair of the Defence and Security Committee. She was also a member of the International Relations Committee, the State and Enterprise Committee, the Agricultural Committee, the Legal Affairs Committee and the Women's Parliamentary Caucus.

In March 2018 she reported that there were efforts in the Democratic Progressive Party to oust her from her seat. In July 2018 she joined Saulos Chilima's new political party, United Transformation Movement.

== See also ==
- Politics of Malawi
