= Ekwendeni =

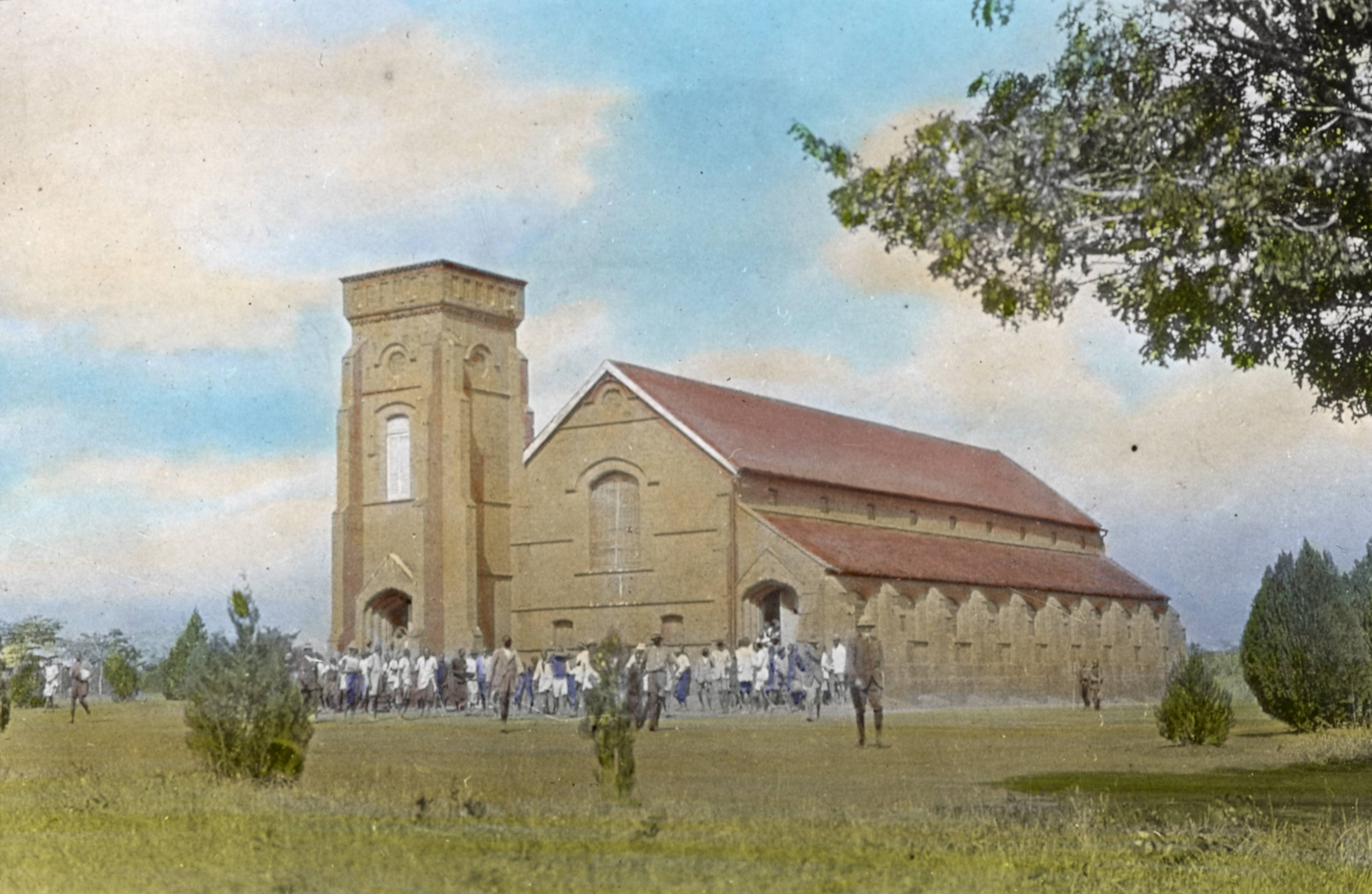
- Ekwendeni Church, ca.1895

- Location in Malawi
- Coordinates: 11°22′S 33°53′E
- Country: Malawi
- Region: Northern Region
- District: Mzimba District
- Time zone: +2
- Climate: Cwa

Ekwendeni is a town in the Northern Region of Malawi. It lies about 20 kilometres (12 mi) from Mzuzu, in the Mzimba District.

== History ==
Ekwendeni was started by Scottish missionaries; in 1889 Walter Angus Elmslie opened a mission station at Ekwendeni. It has one of the oldest churches in Malawi belonging to the Church of Central Africa Presbyterian (CCAP), the local equivalent of the Church of Scotland. In the 1920s, Jack and Mamie Martin were missionaries to Bandawe and Ekwendeni. Mamie created classes for girls to be educated when parents were known for preferring to educate their sons. Mamie died in 1928 but her family later created the Scottish charity called the Mamie Martin Fund which subsidises the education of girls in northern Malawi.

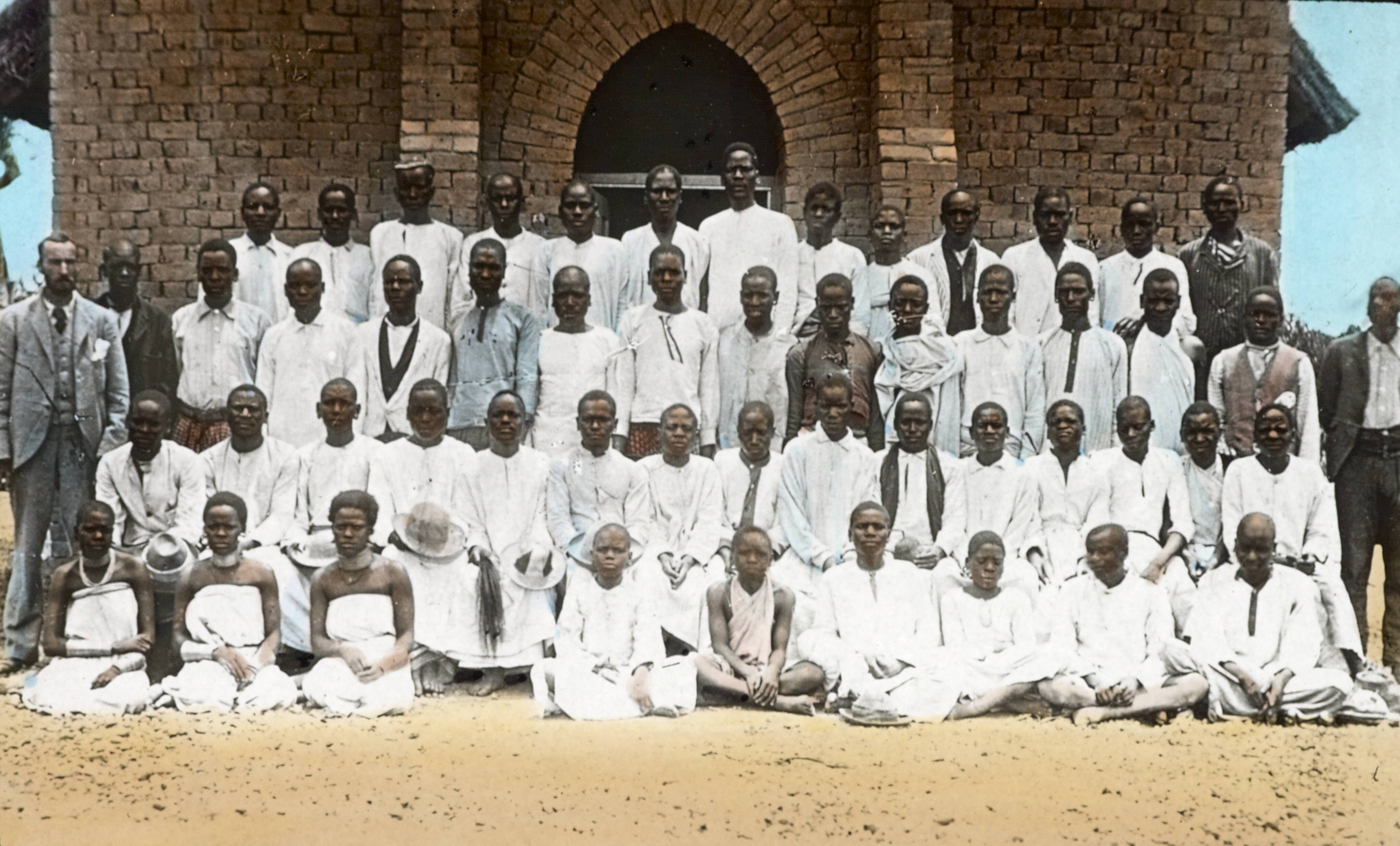
W. A. Elmslie and a group of teachers from Ekwendeni at the Livingstonia Mission, ca1895

The general hospital began in the 1890s as a ministry of the Free Church of Scotland. Ekwendeni Hospital is operated by the Church of Central Africa Presbyterian – Synod of Livingstonia, in partnership with the Presbyterian Church (USA), the Church of Scotland and the Presbyterian Church of Ireland. Ekwendeni Girls’ Secondary School was opened by the Synod in 1975.

The first woman to be a minister in Malawi was Reverend Martha Mwale who had been a political prisoner for several years. She was the moderator for the Edwendeni Synod in 2002 and 2003.

== Description ==
Tumbuka is the dominant language but other languages are spoken due to the high numbers of people from other parts of Malawi settling there. Residents of Ekwendeni were often attracted there because of the hospital, the theological college, the college of nursing and the technical training school.

Ekwendeni is largely surrounded by tobacco growing farms. It has a high HIV/AIDS prevalence rate as it is a favourite resting place for truck drivers travelling along the M1 road that connects Malawi with Tanzania, Kenya and beyond.

International donors are some of the main patrons of the development of the area. The town's scenery and natural landscape views contribute to it as a tourist destination.

== Governance ==
The Ekwendeni ward is a major part of the Mzimba North East Constituency. At the 2025 Malawian General Election the sitting MP Catherine Gotani Hara took nearly 15,000 votes to win the Mzimba North East seat with Edgar Tembo in second place.

== People ==
Kenneth Kaunda's mother Helen Nyirenda Kaunda was born near here in about 1885. The broadcaster Nyokase Madise was born here 30 April 1939. Elizabeth Mantell was a Zambian-born Scottish missionary from MacDuff in Aberdeenshire. She returned to Malawi in 1983 and she was involved with creating the new Ekwendeni hospital in 1986 and serving as the first Principal of the Ekwendeni College of Health Sciences until 1996.

Anita Chitaya, smallholder farmer, community organiser and climate activist from Bwabwa in Ekwendeni where she works with Soils, Food and Healthy Communities (SFHC). SFHC is a farmer-led agroecology organisation. Chitaya is the subject and narrator of the 2021 documentary The Ants and the Grasshopper, directed by Raj Patel and Zak Piper, which follows her efforts to convince Americans that climate change is real.

== Common greetings in Tumbuka ==
Greeting	Meaning	Explanation
Monire	"Hello"	A general greeting equivalent to "Hello."
Muli wuli?	"How are you?"	A polite way to ask about someone's well-being.
Mwawuka mbuni?	"Did you wake up well?"	The word *mbu* adds a gentle emphasis or politeness.
Mwawuka wuli? / Wawuka mbuni?	"How did you wake up?"	Similar in meaning to the previous phrase, focusing on someone's morning.
Mwatandala mbuni? / Mwatandala wuli?	"Did you spend the day well?"	Commonly used in the afternoon to check on how someone's day has been.
Mwatandala wuli?	"How has your day been?"	A more detailed inquiry about their day.
Mulipo?	"Are you there?" or "Are you around?"	Often used to check on someone's presence or availability.
