= Mamie Martin =

British missionary active in Nyasaland (1891–1928)

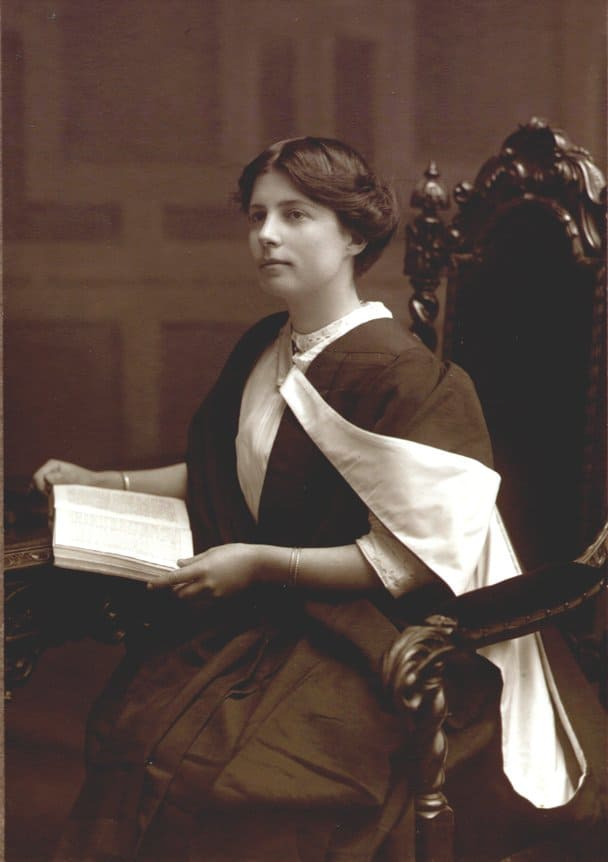
- Martin in 1915
- Born: Mary Evelyn Telfer; 7 July 1891; Calcutta, Bengal, British India
- Died: 24 September 1928 (aged 37); Bandawe, Nyasaland
- Other name: Nyankhutowa
- Education: University of Edinburgh
- Occupation: Missionary
- Spouse: Jack Martin
- Children: 2

Mary "Mamie" Evelyn Martin (née Telfer; 7 July 1891 – 24 September 1928), also known as Nyankhutowa, was a British missionary active in Nyasaland (present-day Malawi). Her life and letters inspired the establishment of the Mamie Martin Fund, a Scottish charity dedicated to improving girls' education in Malawi, and her letters have formed the basis of two books.

== Life ==
Martin was born Mary Evelyn Telfer on 7 July 1891 in Calcutta, British India (present-day Kolkata, India) to Alexander Prentice Telfer and Margaret Thomson Telfer (née Lennox). Both of her parents worked as missionaries in Calcutta. The family returned to Scotland in 1897, when she was five, after her father was asked to lead Tarbet United Free Presbyterian Church. He led that church for 28 years, settling in Tarbet on the side of Loch Lomond. Mamie gained three younger sisters while in Tarbet.

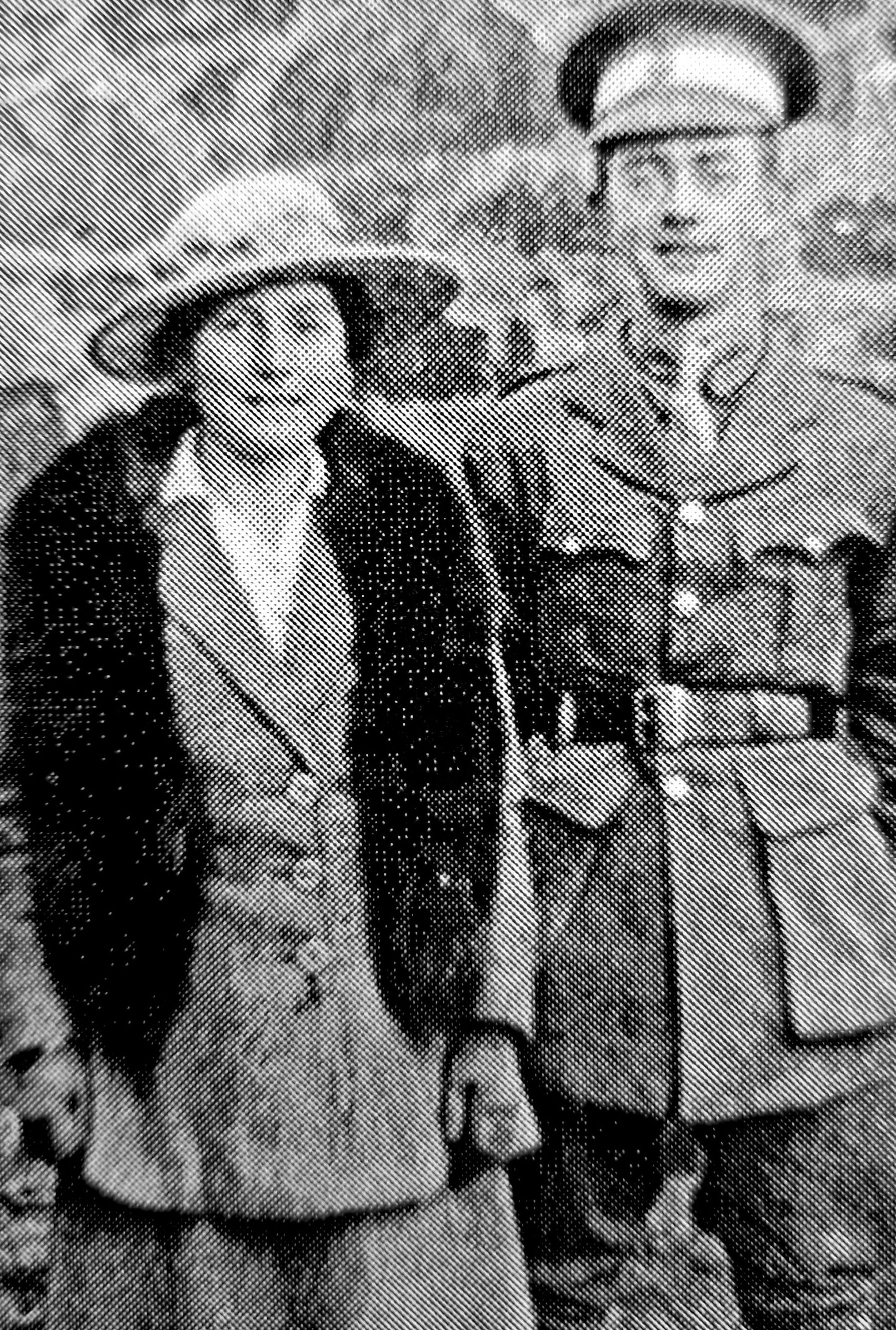
Mamie Telfer and her fiance in 1915

She met Jack Martin at a family picnic in 1911. They soon discovered they were both set to study arts at the University of Edinburgh. During their enrolment there, she would write to him three times a week. She again wrote to him as he served in the army during World War One. Jack was injured in 1918 and he was sent home. They eventually married in 1921. Jack was accepted as a missionary. In 1921, Jack and Mamie Martin arrived in South Africa where they met Jane Elizabeth Waterston, a fellow Scot, who had briefly worked in Nyasaland. According to Mamie, Waterston spoke emphatically about her experience there.

The Martins were travelling to Nyasaland to serve as missionaries at Bandawe. Their seven-week journey included passage aboard the former troopship Dunluce Castle and the sternwheeler Empress. Mamie later recalled being impressed that her cabin was equipped with electric lighting. The Bandawe mission had been established in 1878. In Nyasaland, Mamie organized classes for girls at a time when many families prioritised the education of boys. She led her first service (for women) in 1924. Women took a more leading role than some accounts report. She encouraged her girl boarders and they began to take part in services. Her husband was one of the progressive missionaries. She was particularly impressed, that year, after hearing Harry Kambwiri Matecheta speak. "Reverend Harry" was to be the first African minister in Malawi.

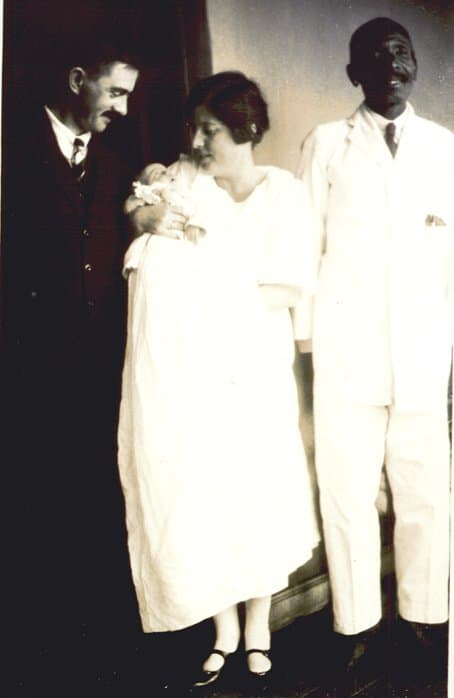
Jack, Mamie (holding Margaret) and the man who christened her, Rev. Hezekiah Tweya

Women missionaries were generally expected to be subservient, however Mamie did get to lead. Experienced female single missionary women would be expected to respect newly arrived male missionaries who would be given more responsibility. The partial exception was when the male lead of the mission was away for a few weeks. Then his wife was expected to take his role. Wives were not paid, but Mamie was happy to teach without a salary. She wrote in her diary that she would be wasted if she was left to housework. She had an MA degree and she wanted to teach. She began to understand the culture. Mamie noted that she cleverly paid a woman for carrying bananas to her. The woman was poor and she had been imprisoned for not having money to pay the hut-tax. However she refused to break custom and take Mamie's money for her gift of bananas. Mamie however found that she was happy to be paid for delivering them.

Mamie and Jack had a daughter, Margaret, who is said to be the first baby to be baptised by an African (at their mission).

On 24 September 1928, Mamie died in Bandawe from Blackwater fever following childbirth along with her stillborn second child, a son. Both are buried in Bandawe.

== Legacy ==
In 1988, her descendants discovered hundreds of letters she had written during her years in Malawi. Members of the family subsequently travelled to Malawi to visit the places where she had lived and worked, inspiring her daughter Margaret Sinclair's creation of the Mamie Martin Fund in 1993. Margaret Sinclair later wrote a book based on the letters her mother had sent between 1921 and 1928. Margaret's ashes lie by her mother and brother close to Bandawe Girls Secondary School which is one of the schools that receives funding from the charity they inspired. Isobel Reid wrote another book, published in 2024, which uses Martin's letters as a significant source.
