= W. A. Elmslie =

Scottish missionary

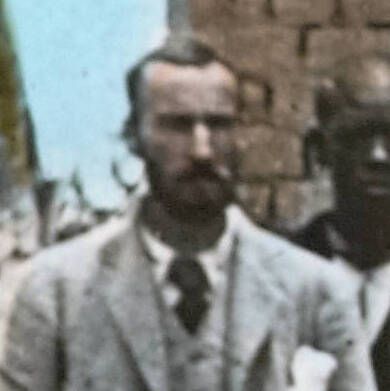
- Born: Walter Angus Elmslie; 1856; Aberdeen
- Died: 1935 (aged 78–79); Scotland
- Education: University of Aberdeen
- Occupations: writer and missionary
- Known for: working in Malawi and publishing the first books in the Ngoni language

Rev. Walter Angus Elmslie (1856–1935) was a Scottish missionary of the Livingstonia Mission in Nyasaland (now Malawi) and associate of Robert Laws.

== Life ==
He was born in Aberdeen which is where he went to university. He became a missionary spending his time in northern Malawi at where one of the first churches in Malawi was built. He was working in Ekwendeni with William Koyi who was a missionary born and trained in South Africa at the Lovedale mission station. Elmslie appreciated Kopi's knowledge of the local people but he criticised him for being too close. Others saw Kopi as Elmslie's interpreter and right-hand man and they wanted to know who would take over from him when he died in 1886.

Elmslie published the first book in the Ngoni language in 1886 titled Izongoma zo ‘Mlungu, which included hymns and tracts. He later published a translation of St Mark's gospel in Ngoni and books on the Ngoni language.

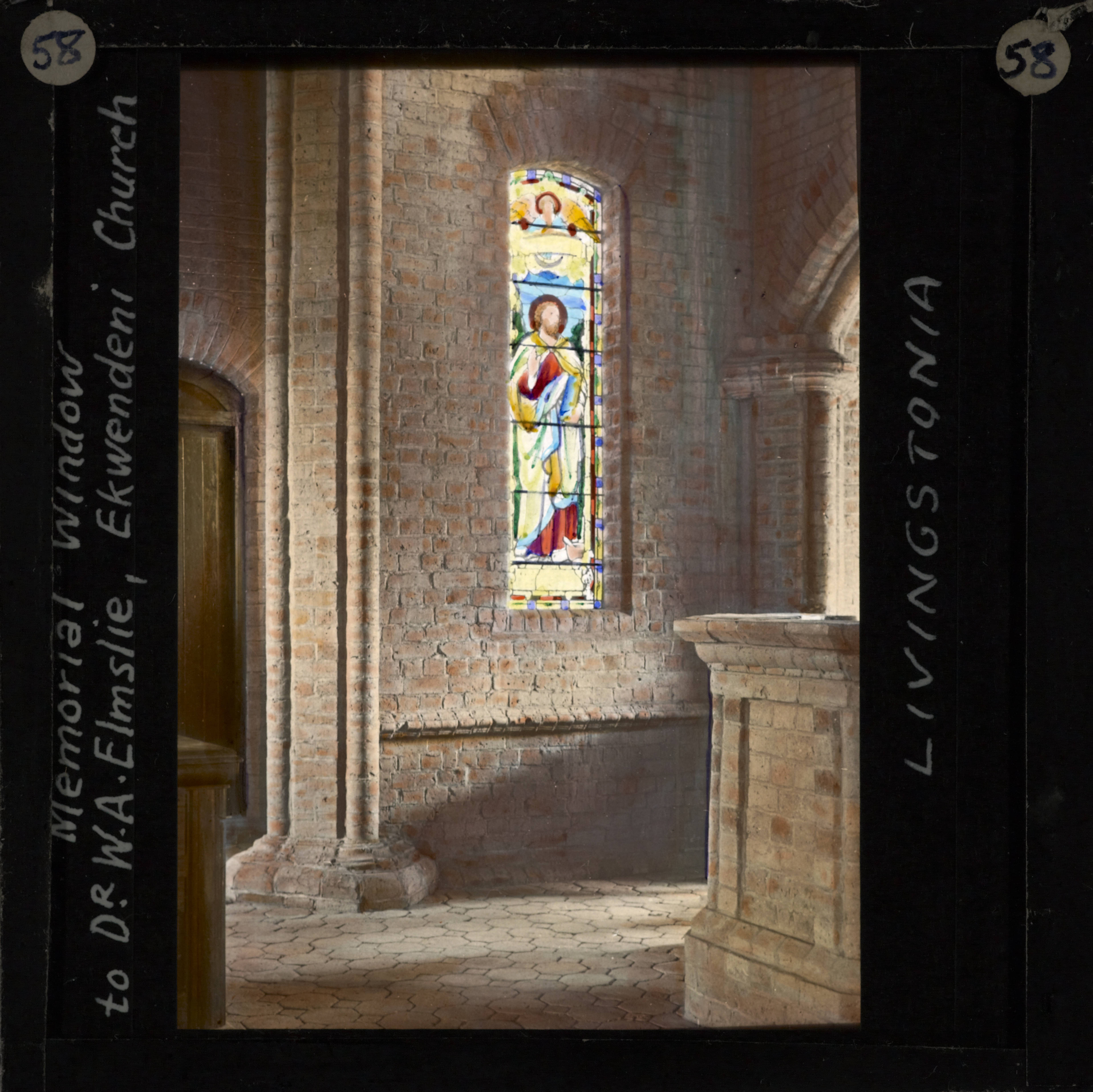
Memorial window to Elmslie in Ekwendeni Church

== Works ==
- Izongoma zo ‘Mlungu,, 1886
- Among the Wild Ngoni
- Table of Concords and Paradigm of Verb of the Ngoni Language 1891
- How Came our Faith - dealing with the life and work of seven Old Testament prophets
