= Ngoni dialect =

Dialect of Zulu spoken in Zambia and Malawi

Ngoni
- IsiNgoni
- Native to: Zambia (extinct?), Malawi
- Region: Mzimba District
- Ethnicity: Ngoni
- Native speakers: (declining)
- Language family: Niger–Congo?: Atlantic–Congo; Volta-Congo; Benue–Congo; Bantoid; Southern Bantoid; Bantu; Southern Bantu; Nguni-Tsonga; Nguni; Zunda; Zulu; Ngoni

Language codes
- ISO 639-3: –
- Glottolog: ngon1266
- Guthrie code: N.121

Ngoni, or Ngoni of Malawi, is a dialect of Zulu once spoken in Zambia and Malawi. The warlike Ngoni people who fled from Shaka Zulu's conquests in turn conquered several areas of Zambia, Malawi, Tanganyika and Mozambique, but the languages of their more numerous neighborns, primarily Chewa and Tumbuka in the case of Malawi, dominated. In most regions the Ngoni no longer speak their ancestral language except for ritual speech in traditional ceremonies. In more rural areas of Mzimba District in northern Malawi, however, some communities maintain the language.
