= Livingstonia, Malawi =

Livingstonia Kondowe
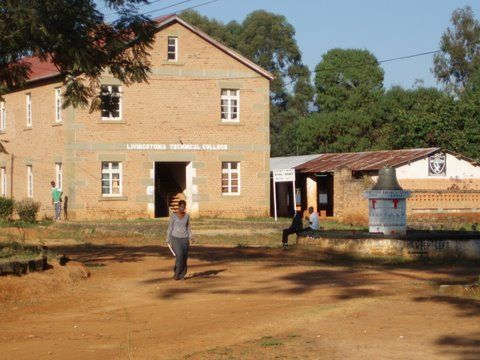

- Location in Malawi
- Coordinates: 10°36′S 34°07′E
- Country: Malawi
- Region: Northern Region
- District: Rumphi District

Population (2008)
  - Total: 6,690
- Time zone: +2
- Climate: Cwa

Livingstonia or Kondowe is a town located in the Northern Region district of Rumphi in Malawi and is home to Livingstonia Mission. It is 430 kilometres (270 miles) north of the capital, Lilongwe, and connected by road to Chitimba on the shore of Lake Malawi. Chitumbuka is the predominant language spoken in the area.

== History ==
Livingstonia was founded in 1894 by missionaries from the Free Church of Scotland. The missionaries had first established a mission in 1875 at Cape Maclear, which they named Livingstonia after David Livingstone, whose death in 1873 had rekindled British support for missions in Eastern Africa. The mission was linked with the Livingstonia Central Africa Company, set up as a commercial business in 1877. By 1881 Cape Maclear had proved extremely malarial and the mission moved north to Bandawe. This site also proved unhealthy and the Livingstonia Mission moved once again to the higher grounds between Lake Malawi and Nyika Plateau. This new site proved highly successful because Livingstonia is located in the mountains and therefore not prone to mosquitoes carrying malaria. The mission station gradually developed into a small town.

The leading missionary for 52 years was Robert Laws. He established the best school in the region at the time in Livingstonia, and its graduates became influential in several neighbouring countries, including South Africa. Among the alumni of the school was writer Legson Kayira, who graduated in 1958. The title of his autobiographical work I Will Try was taken from the school motto.

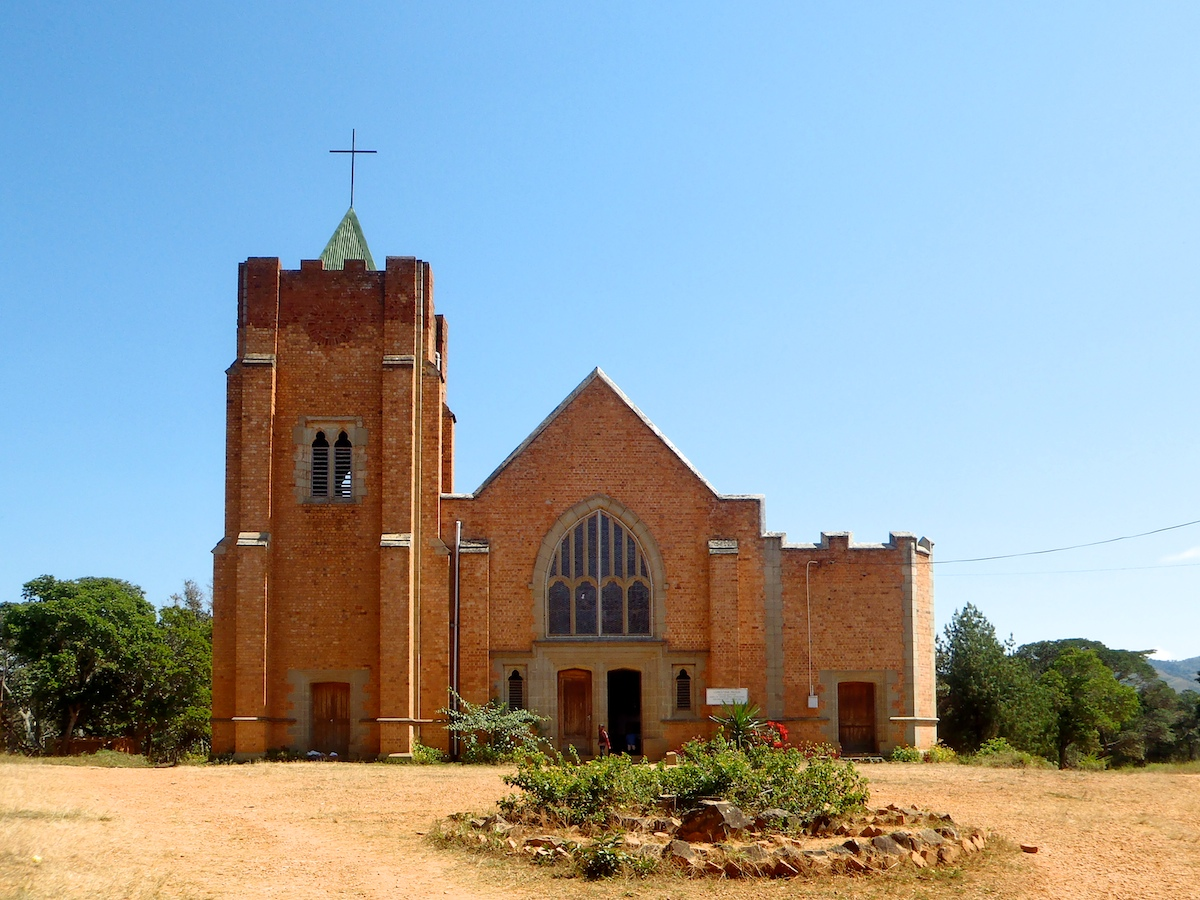
Livingstonia Mission Church

Laws wanted Livingstonia to develop into a University, but his successors did not pursue the dream until 2003, when the Livingstonia Synod of the Church of Central Africa, Presbyterian (CCAP) renewed the vision and started University of Livingstonia .

== Facilities ==
The houses in Livingstonia are mostly constructed with red bricks. The Stone House, the original house of Robert Laws, is now a hotel. It also has a small museum about the history of Livingstonia.

== Demographics ==
In 2008, the population of Livingstonia was 6,690.

== Transportation ==
The town is connected to Chitimba on Lake Malawi by the S103 (T305), a steep hillside road with multiple hairpin bends, while the T306 and T305 run to the south. The road branching off M1 to the left at Phwezi township is now complete tarmac up to Livingstonia.

== Hospital ==
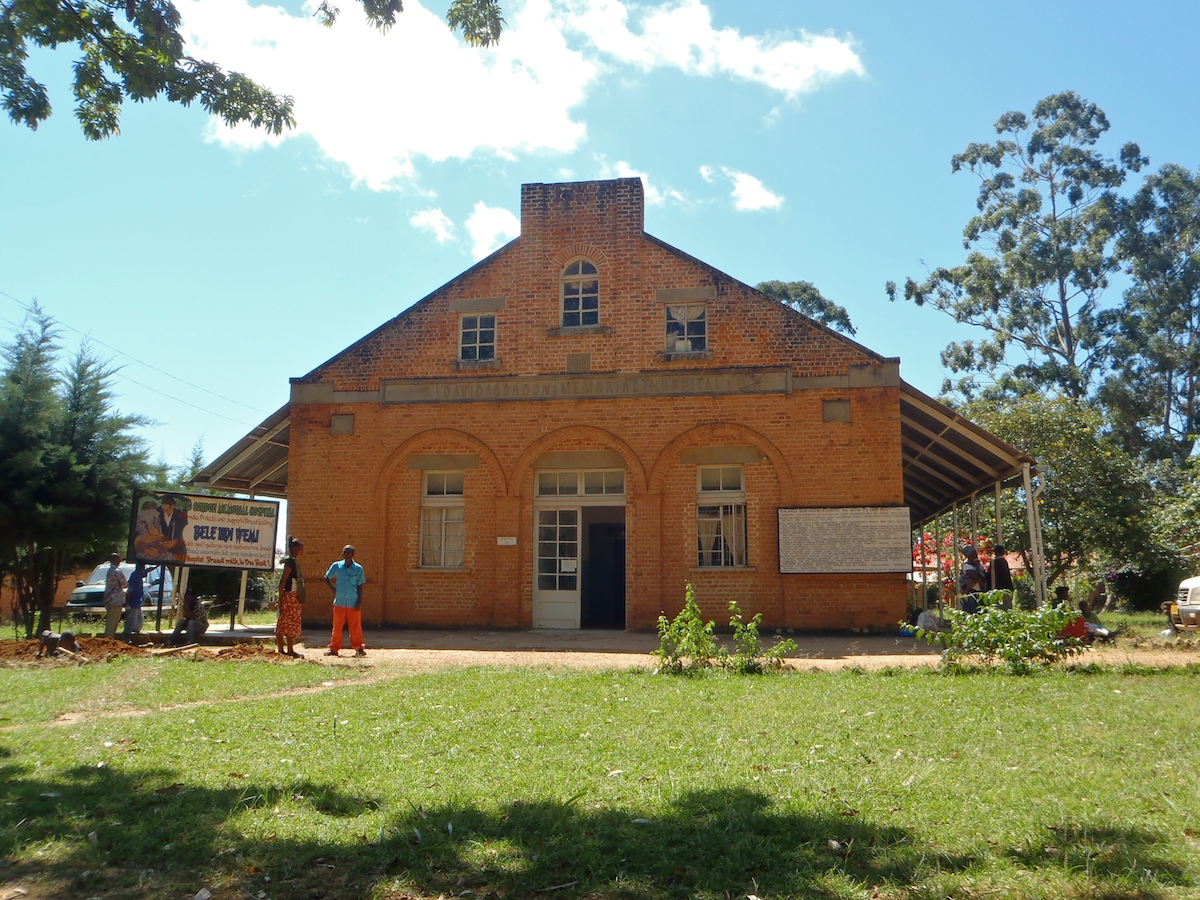
Main building of the David Gordon Memorial Hospital in 2011

Livingstonia Police Unit

David Gordon Memorial Hospital had its foundation stone laid in 1910 and was opened in 1911. David Gondwe was Livingstonia's first formally trained hospital assistant. He was sacked as the mission administration discovered his polygamous marriage, and thought that rendered him "unstable". However, he was soon employed by the governmental Colonial Medical Services. The hospital currently serves a catchment area with a population of approximately 60,000.
