= Ceciwa Khonje =

Malawian political activist (born 1938)

- Born: Dinah Ceciwa Bwanausi; 13 July 1938 (age 88); Blantyre, Nyasaland
- Occupation: broadcaster
- Known for: first Malawian woman broadcaster
- Spouse: Shadrack Khonje

Ceciwa Khonje or Dinah Ceciwa Bwanausi Khonje (born 13 July 1938) is a Malawian-born broadcaster and political activist. She learnt radio broadcasting in Malawi and later worked in exile for the Zambia National Broadcasting Corporation. Her contribution to the independence of Malawi was overlooked for many decades.

== Life ==
Khonje was born in Blantyre in 1938. She was one of five children born to James Willard and Kumachemba Nettie (born Somanje) Bwanausi. Her family were active members of the church. who were in the Somanje Royal family. Her sister was Molly and her siblings included Augustine Bwanausi and Harry Bwanausi.

Khonje attended Blantyre Secondary School. She married Shadrack Grey Khonje, who was a biology teacher at her former school; the couple were active in what became the Malawi Congress Party when the word "Malawi" started to become popular. She recounted having to dive into ditches when walking to political meetings to avoid being arrested for breaking the curfew.

When her child was about to be born in 1961 she was taken to Blantyre's Queen Elizabeth Central Hospital. Her white neighbour, who was also about to deliver, was taken to the delivery ward, but she was left in reception because she was black. Her brother Harry, who was a doctor at the hospital, joined her protests. She won the argument and was taken to the "whites only" delivery ward, creating a precedent for those who followed her.

In 1963, she went to the UK, where she attended a year-long BBC course in broadcasting. She joined BBC broadcasts to Africa and returned to work for the Malawi Broadcasting Corporation (MBC). There, she refused to read broadcasts, sent by the staff of president Hastings Banda, that the MBC was required to read to listeners.

Khonje did not return to work for the MBC after hearing that the president was complaining about the broadcaster who had refused to read his announcements. Her husband, now a headteacher at a school, also became noticed when he refused to have lessons interrupted for political messages. They were both summoned to talk to the President. He listened and appeared to accept their explanations, but they heard rumours that they were to be killed.

She and her family left for Zambia during the Cabinet Crisis in Malawi. Her brothers had been arrested on 7 March and over a thousand people had been detained. She found employment with the Zambia Broadcasting Corporation. She worked for a Dutch radio broadcaster and in 1983 she was in New York where she had been appointed as director of the Africa desk of the United Nations Information Services.

In 1999, she resigned from the diplomatic corps of the United Nations and went to live in South Africa where she worked for their diplomatic corps before starting to design jewellery.

Joey Power, a history academic in Toronto who wrote the 2010 book, Political Culture and Nationalism in Malawi: Building Kwacha, has been credited with trying to correct the history devised by Hastings Banda. The book describes the development of the Malawi Congress Party and unravels the notion that Hastings Banda was the sole reason that the country achieved independence. The book mentions Ceciwa Khonja as well as her brother Augustine Bwanausi as contributing to independence but being "rubbed out of history". The book also mentions Henry Masauko Chipembere, Kanyama Chiume, Orton Chirwa, Dunduzu Kaluli Chisiza, Yatuta Chisiza, Willie Chokani, Rose Chibambo and Attati Mpakati as important figures who should have been credited by historians for their role in the nation's birth.

== Private life ==
Khonje married and had children. She is a loyal church member.
