= Rose Chibambo =

Malawian politician (1928–2016)

Rose Lomathinda Chibambo
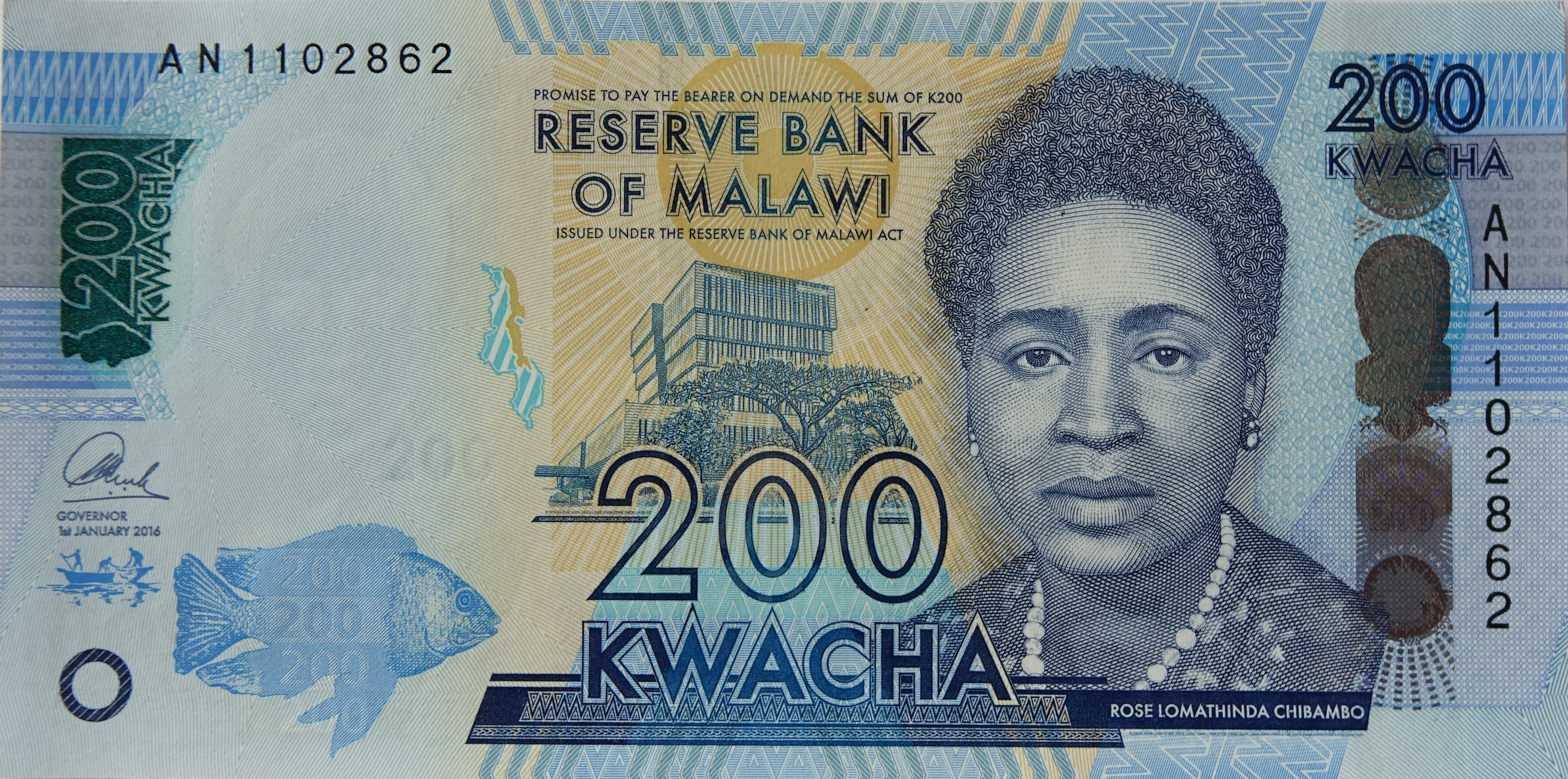

Parliamentary Secretary for Community and Social Development
- In office 1964

Personal details
- Born: Lomathinda Ziba; 8 September 1928 Mzimba District, Nyasaland (present day Malawi)
- Died: 12 January 2016 (aged 87) Blantyre, Malawi
- Occupation: Activist

Rose Lomathinda Chibambo (8 September 1928 – 12 January 2016) was a prominent politician in the British Protectorate of Nyasaland in the years leading up to independence as the state of Malawi in 1964, and immediately after.

She organised Malawian women in their political fight against the British as a political force to be reckoned with alongside their menfolk in the push for independence. She was arrested on 23 March 1959, two days after giving birth to a girl, and taken to Zomba prison. Her fellow freedom fighters, including Hastings Banda were arrested earlier, on the morning of 3 March when governor Robert Armitage declared a state of emergency. After Malawi gained independence in 1964, Rose Chibambo was the first woman minister in the new cabinet. When she fell out with Hastings Banda she was forced into exile for thirty years, returning after the restoration of democracy.

== Background ==
Rose Lomathinda Chibambo (Ziba maiden name) was born in Mzimba District to a Tumbuka family on 8 September 1928 when Nyasaland was still a protectorate under British colonial rule. Her father was a teacher and she had a difficult birth so her parents named her Lomathindo because she was "stolen from the grave". In 1947, she married Edwin Chibambo, formerly a teacher and later a civil servant. Her husband named her "Rose". He was the son of the Reverend Yesaya Chibambo, one of the first Africans in the protectorate to be ordained as a Christian minister. In 1948 her husband was posted to the Zomba Public Works department. She completed her secondary education at night school in Zomba in 1948 while pregnant with her first child. She had another child in 1951, and four more later. The youngest was born in 1961.

== Nyasaland African Congress leader ==
In 1952, Rose became aware of Nyasaland African Congress (NAC) politics during the controversy over the colonial government's plan to make Nyasaland part of the Federation of Rhodesia and Nyasaland, which the NAC saw as a betrayal of the agreement by the government to put the interests of Africans first. She decided that women should be more involved in the struggle, and began to organize her friends in Zomba, mostly the wives of civil servants. Some issues were specific to women, such as the fact that in some stores women could only do their shopping through a wicket, and that elderly women were not examined in private in the hospitals, but in rooms filled with women of all ages.

She once stated: "[Y]ou know, we are the mothers. We are the ones who bring out children and these children are employed by Wenela [in South Africa] at that time. They go to Wenela and most of them die there. They don't come back alive. And then there's a lot of oppression. There's this thangata and with that federation, unfortunately for them, that time, they had already started removing people in the areas where they thought it was best for Europeans or it was best for farming ... They wanted to make room for Europeans to settle. I said, you can see all these things. Now, we are being removed in our rural areas. We are being pushed here and there. And the women understood. They said, oh yes, then we must do something".

In 1953 Edwin Chibambo was transferred to Blantyre, according to Rose because of his political activities. Rose Chibambo joined the local NAC branch and was elected treasurer, the first woman to hold a senior position in the NAC. In Blantyre, she joined forces with Vera Chirwa to form the Nyasaland African Women's League, closely associated with the NAC. Executives of the Women's League would select fabric from which they made matching outfits. The purpose was to show solidarity at public occasions, identifying members as a group.

She respected the moderate leaders of the NAC but thought some, including the President J.R.N. Chinyama, had been too cautious. In Chinyama's case this might be since he remembered his father's execution after the Chilembe uprising of 1915. She rejected federation and in the later part of 1955 she was among those who called for the withdrawal of the NAC members Manowa Chirwa and Clement Kumbikano from the Federal parliament in Salisbury. At 30 March 1956 annual general meeting in Blantyre the delegates from Johannesburg supported her position on non-co-operation with the Federal government, although she had been pessimistic that they would be given a hearing.

In 1956, Rose Chibambo organised a group of women to protest when the NAC president James Frederick Sangala and secretary T.D.T. Banda were arrested for sedition. Her group was arrested and fined after they travelled by bus to the High Court in Zomba singing:

"War! War! War today!
We are going to have war.
We don't want, we don't want, we don't want federation.
We want freedom today!"

In a 1999 interview, Rose described the use of song at the women's meetings. She said "In most cases, our singing, like in the woman's league, we would take some of the songs sung in the villages, then we put in political words to suit the occasion... There wasn't any particular person at that time, that this was the one who composed those songs for us to sing. No, it was just general singing. Just as we are here. You could start a song, and our songs in most cases, our African songs, they are traditional. They are not difficult to sing. We could easily pick it up, and then we would all sing". She was quite clear that singing and dancing was not the primary purpose of the women's meetings. She said "I had this feeling ... women should be part and parcel of the whole movement, even of running the country. Women should be involved in decision making. That was my aim".

== Hastings Banda period ==
In July 1958, Dr. Hastings Banda was elected President of the Congress, and began to tour the country speaking out for independence. In 1958, Chibambo organised the League of Malawi Women. The group used the profits from a monopoly on the sale of millet beer to fund their activities. With growing tension between the NAC and the colonial authorities, in a January 1959 Congress meeting it was agreed that if Banda was arrested or deported a general strike would be called. Rose Chibambo would become a member of a four-person executive committee to conduct the affairs of the congress in Banda's absence.

On 3 March 1959, the governor Robert Armitage declared a state of emergency. Over the next 24 hours, almost all the MCP leaders were arrested. In April 1959, Jet magazine reported: "The top woman leader of the outlawed African National Congress, Mrs. Rose Chibambo, 29, who was arrested after giving birth to her fifth child, has taken the infant with her to jail". She had been allowed to remain at liberty until the child was born. The British later accepted that independence for Nysasaland was inevitable, and released Hastings Banda in March 1960. Banda was appointed Life President of the Malawi Congress Party (MCP), the successor to the NAC. The MCP swept the elections to the Legislative Council in 1961.

On 1 February 1963, Nyasaland gained self-governance, and Banda was appointed prime minister. Rose Chibambo won the Mzimba North seat in the 1964 elections and was made Parliamentary Secretary for Community and Social Development. The country became independent as Malawi later in the year.

== Dismissal and later career ==
On 7 September 1964 there was a cabinet crisis, in which Chibambo and others opposed Hastings Banda. Issues included Banda's decision to charge for health services and to move slowly in Africanization of the civil service. This was coupled with a general feeling that Banda was becoming increasingly autocratic. Chibambo was dismissed from the cabinet the next day. Banda declared that the rebel leaders were traitors to the state and threats to national security. Chibambo and the others were suspended from the party, which prevented them from attending party meetings and prevented members of the party from attending their meetings, giving Banda full control of the MCP. She and her husband faced constant harassment until they fled to Zambia in 1965, where they faced the challenge of starting a new life.

Rose Chibambo returned to Malawi in 1994. She became a businesswoman in Mzuzu, and was prominent in politics and church activities. She was a member of Church Action Relief Development, which assists the orphans of victims of HIV/AIDS, the Christian Service Committee, the Malawi Council of Churches and the Interdenominational Support Group for Prisoners.

She died on January 12, 2016, in Mwaiwathu Private Hospital in Blantyre at age 87.

== Legacy ==
In 2009 the President Bingu wa Mutharika met Rose Chibambo and honoured her, naming a street in Mzuzu City after her. Joey Power who was a history academic in Toronto and her 2010 book, Political Culture and Nationalism in Malawi: Building Kwacha, has been credited with trying to correct the history devised by Hastings Banda. The book describes the development of the Malawi Congress Party and unravels the notion that Hastings Banda was the sole reason that the country achieved independence. The book mentions Rose Chibambo as well as Ceciwa Khonje and her brother Augustine Bwanausi, Henry Masauko Chipembere, Kanyama Chiume, Orton Chirwa, Dunduzu Kaluli Chisiza, Yatuta Chisiza, Willie Chokani and Attati Mpakati as important figures who should have been credited by historians for their role in the nation's birth.

As of 1 January 2012, she appears on Malawi's 200 Kwacha banknote.

In 2019, Dr Timwa Lipenga published "Lomathinda: Rose Chibambo Speaks".
