= Colin Cameron (Malawian politician) =

Scottish lawyer and politician

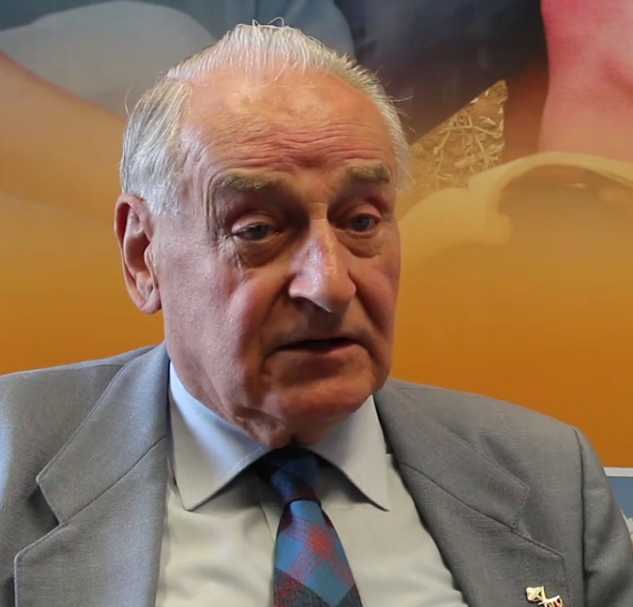
- in 2017 in a Scotland Malawi Partnership video

Minister of Works and Transport
- In office 1961–1964
- Monarch: Elizabeth II
- Governor General: Robert Perceval Armitage
- Prime Minister: Hastings Banda

Minister of Works
- In office 1964 – 29 July 1964
- Monarch: Elizabeth II
- Governor General: Glyn Smallwood Jones
- Prime Minister: Hastings Banda

Member of the Legislative Council
- In office 1961–1964

Member of the National Assembly
- In office 1964–1964

Personal details
- Born: 24 August 1933 (age 92) Lanark, Scotland
- Party: Malawi Congress Party; Independent
- Spouse: Alison Cameron
- Profession: Lawyer

Colin Cameron (born 24 August 1933) is a Scottish lawyer and politician who served as a Minister and MP in Malawi in the early 1960s.

== Biography ==
Born in Lanark in Scotland, Cameron attended Uddingston Grammar School and went on to gain a Bachelor of Law from the University of Glasgow in 1957. Cameron moved to Nyasaland after seeing an advert in the Glasgow Herald for a lawyer in Blantyre for a salary much higher than the one he had been offered in Glasgow, which would allow him to get married. His application for immigration to the Federation of Rhodesia and Nyasaland was approved and he and his new wife, Alison, arrived on honeymoon on 6 July 1957.

Once in Nyasaland, he travelled widely within the country and became sympathetic to the independence movement. He represented several nationalists in their trials following their arrests during the State of Emergency in March 1959. He was also a member of the Church of Central African Presbyterian, which he joined in 1959. In 1960 his employment contract expired and he returned to Scotland. However, Hastings Banda invited him back to Nyasaland in 1961 to run in the general elections that year. Although Banda initially asked Cameron to run in the Blantyre constituency against Michael Hill Blackwood, Cameron requested that he be given a seat with a realistic chance of winning, and was instead nominated in the Soche constituency, where he ran as a pro-Malawi Congress Party independent. Cameron succeeded in winning one of the eight seats on the higher roll (largely reserved for European and Asian voters), and was appointed Minister of Works and Transport, later becoming Minister of Transport and Communications.

In the 1964 elections Cameron was re-elected, the only European to be elected as an MCP candidate. Following the elections, he was appointed Minister of Works, and was the only European member of the first post-independence cabinet.

However, on 29 July 1964 Cameron resigned from the cabinet, the first of several resignations and dismissals that led to the Cabinet Crisis. His resignation was a protest against Banda seeking to reintroduce preventative detention, which he had previously criticised the British authorities for using. Banda offered Cameron's portfolio to Peter Moxon, but Moxon refused to take as he also opposed the detention measures. In late August Cameron was contacted by Minister of Labour Willie Chokani, who told him that Banda had resigned and Cameron was included in the new government to be sworn in the following day. However, as he was about to travel to Zomba, Cameron heard on the radio that Banda would not be resigning.

Cameron subsequently returned to legal practice, and represented former Minister of Education Henry Masauko Blasius Chipembere in a high court case against Banda. However, this resulted in him having to leave Malawi in November 1964 for his own safety, and he returned to Scotland to continue working as a lawyer, establishing his own practice in Irvine.

After multi-party politics was reintroduced to Malawi in the 1990s, Cameron was invited to become the Honorary Consul of Malawi in Scotland by new President Bakili Muluzi. In 2017 he was invited by the President to celebrate the anniversary of Malawi's independence exactly 60 years after he had arrived. He was the only surviving member of Malawi's first cabinet.
