= 1964 Malawi cabinet crisis =

Malawian political crisis

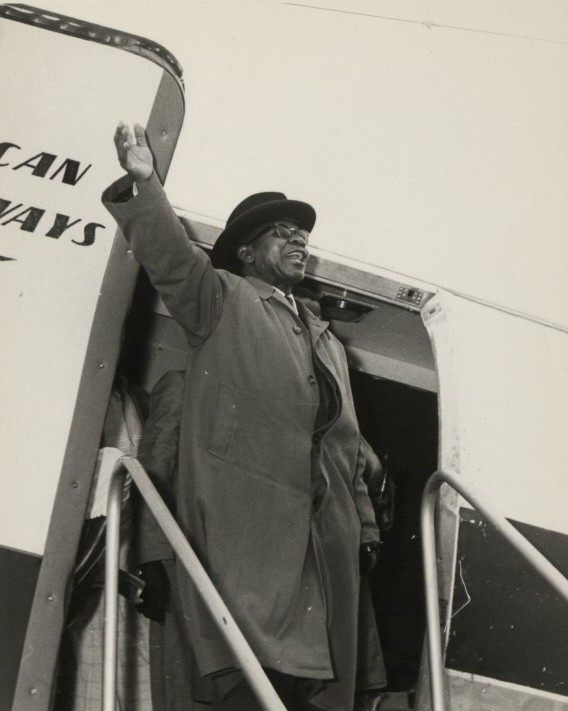
Hastings Banda, pictured on a visit to Tanzania in the 1960s, was at the heart of the Cabinet Crisis of 1964

In August and September 1964, a cabinet crisis occurred in Malawi following the dismissal of three cabinet ministers and a parliamentary secretary by Prime Minister Hastings Banda on 7 September. The dismissals came after an unresolved confrontation, between Banda and some of his ministers on 26 August, and would be followed by the resignations of three more cabinet ministers along with another parliamentary secretary who were sympathetic with those who were dismissed. Initially, this only left the President and one other minister in post, although one of those who had resigned rescinded his resignation within a few hours.

The reasons that the ex-ministers put forward for the confrontation and subsequent resignations were the autocratic attitude of Banda, who failed to consult other ministers and kept power in his own hands, his insistence on maintaining diplomatic relations with South Africa and Portugal, and a number of domestic austerity measures. It is unclear whether the former ministers intended to remove Banda entirely, to reduce his role to that of a non-executive figurehead or simply to force him to recognise collective cabinet responsibility.

Banda seized the initiative, firstly, by dismissing some of the dissidents rather than negotiating, and secondly, (after the resignations) by holding a debate on a motion of confidence on 8 and 9 September 1964. As the result of the debate was an overwhelming vote of confidence, Banda declined to reinstate any of the ministers or offer them any other posts, despite the urging of the Governor-General of Malawi, Sir Glyn Jones to compromise.

After some unrest and clashes between supporters of the ex-ministers and of Banda, most of the former left Malawi in October 1964 with their families and leading supporters, for Zambia or Tanzania. One ex-minister, Henry Chipembere went into hiding inside Malawi and, in February 1965, led a small, unsuccessful armed uprising. After its failure, he was able to emigrate to the USA. Another ex-minister, Yatuta Chisiza, organised an even smaller incursion from Mozambique in 1967, in which he was killed. Several of the former ministers died in exile or, in the case of Orton Chirwa in a Malawian jail, but some survived to return to Malawi after Banda was deposed and returned to public life.

The Cabinet Crisis, sometimes referred to as the Revolt of the Ministers is one of the most important but also most controversial episodes in the history of independent Malawi. Many of the contemporary documentary sources were written by expatriate diplomats and officials who were not close to the ex-ministers, and in some cases antagonistic to them. These accounts have been contradicted by the autobiographies, often written long after the event, of the ex-ministers themselves, although these are also inconsistent with one another. The principal published works quoted rely on a mixture of documentary sources and interviews with participants, both African and expatriate, and suggest that the crisis arose in a political culture that permitted no dissent, and treated attempts to debate issues as plotting.

== Nyasaland African Congress ==
=== Development of Congress ===
For most of the colonial period, most Africans in Nyasaland had no political voice and only a small number of chiefs had a very limited influence on the colonial government. They did not represent the interests of a growing body of African town dwellers. Most early African interest groups were local, represented only a small, mainly urban educated African elite and promoted their demands for a political voice, not independence. Only in the 1940s, with the formation of the Nyasaland African Congress, did one organisation represent the whole of Nyasaland. From 1944, various African local associations united into the Nyasaland African Congress, which demanded African representation on the Legislative Council that advised the colonial governors. From 1946, the Nyasaland African Congress received financial and political support from Hastings Banda, then living in Britain. Post-war British governments of both main parties agreed to the formation of a federation of the three British territories in Central Africa, rather than their complete amalgamation, as the Southern Rhodesian government preferred: the Federation of Rhodesia and Nyasaland was pushed through in 1953 against very strong African opposition. Federation radicalised some younger Congress members, and when in 1955, the Colonial Office agreed that the Legislative Council should include five African members nominated by Provincial Councils, they seized the opportunity. Although the Provincial Councils were largely composed of chiefs, their members were receptive to popular wishes, and they nominated Congress members or supporters to the Legislative Council. In 1956, Henry Chipembere and Kanyama Chiume, two young radical members of Congress, were nominated together with two moderate Congress members and a Congress supporter. This success led to a rapid growth in Congress membership in 1956 and 1957.

Chipembere and Chiume were members of a new generation of pan-Africanist politicians, deeply influenced by Socialist and sometimes Marxist ideas and experiences acquired outside Malawi, who realised the value of a well-organised mass movement. Chipembere was a southerner, but many others were northerners. Chiume was born in the Nkhata Bay district but educated entirely in Tanganyika and Uganda. Dunduzu Chisiza and his elder brother, Yatuta Chisiza, had been born in Karonga District before becoming a long-term residents of Uganda and Tanganyika. They were influenced both by Julius Nyerere and Kenneth Kaunda; Dunduzu had also lived in Southern Rhodesia before being deported to Nyasaland for his political activities. During the 1950s, these younger men displaced the older generation as leaders of Congress. They expressed hostility towards Europeanization, which cut them off from their cultural roots, an African middle class sympathising with Federation and the autocratic Chiefs. However, as they lacked status and knowledge of local African customs, they needed a charismatic older man as their leader. The chosen leader, Dr Banda, was sensitive to the country's political tradition. In preaching defiance of the "stupid Federation", Banda was in tune with the popular mood, but he also defended the chiefs and the rights of the older generation of educated men.

=== Banda's return ===
The younger members of the Nyasaland African Congress had little faith in its leader, T D T Banda, and wished to replace him with Dr Hastings Banda, who had by then moved to the Gold Coast. Dr Banda announced he would only return if given the presidency of Congress: after this was agreed, he returned to Nyasaland in July 1958 and T D T Banda was ousted.

When Banda returned to Nyasaland, which he had left in 1915, he was over 60. Chipembere and Chiume and most other leading Congress activists were in their late 20s or early 30s. As well as the age difference there was, from the start, a disagreement about Banda's role: the activists saw him as a figurehead, but he saw himself as the leader of Congress and expected their obedience. Banda was absolutely opposed to Federation, but otherwise more moderate in his speeches that the younger Congress members. Both Chipembere and Chiume avoided social contact with Europeans and, in their speeches, they frequently denounced Europeans as a group, in contrast to Banda's relatively cordial relations with individual Europeans.

Banda appointed Chipembere as Treasurer, Chiume as Publicity Secretary and Dunduzu Chisiza as Secretary-general of Congress. He also appointed four other young radicals to the party's Executive Committee, ignoring older moderates, but made it clear that he regarded his appointees as subordinates, not colleagues. Although these appointees had senior positions, these came with a heavy workload and tied them to the MCP headquarters in Blantyre, away from their grassroots support. In the nine months between his return and the declaration of a State of Emergency, Banda combined opposition to Federation with more popular causes, such as the African smallholders' dislike of agricultural practices imposed on them. He used these popular issues to mobilise Congress supporters into strikes, disobedience and protests that would disrupt the everyday operation of the colonial government.

== The 1959 Emergency ==
=== Background ===
In January 1958, Banda presented Congress proposals for an African majority in the Legislative Council to the governor, Sir Robert Armitage. As this would have led to a demand for withdrawal from the Federation, Armitage refused. This breakdown in talks led to Congress demands for more violent anti-government action, and leading Congress activists made increasingly inflammatory statements. Armitage was influenced by reports from police informers, who claimed Congress planned the indiscriminate killing of Europeans and Asians, and of its African opponents, the so-called "murder plot". There is no evidence that a murder plot existed, but the refusal of Banda or other Congress leaders to condemn the violent actions of Congress members gave it some plausibility. Armitage prepared for mass arrests and, on 20 February, troops from Rhodesia were flown into Nyasaland. In the days following 20 February, both Chipembere and Yatuta Chisiza made a number of provocative speeches, many followed by disturbances, and the police or troops fired on some of these, leading to four deaths.

On 3 March 1959, Armitage declared a State of Emergency over the whole of the protectorate and arrested Banda, other members of the Congress executive committee and over a hundred local party officials. The Nyasaland African Congress was banned the next day. Those arrested were detained without trial and the total number detained finally rose to over 1,300. Rather than calming the situation immediately, in the emergency that followed fifty-one Africans were killed and many more were wounded. By the night of 3 March, most principal Congress leaders had been arrested and detained. Some were released very quickly, but 72 prominent detainees, including Banda, were flown to Southern Rhodesia. Others were detained in Nyasaland. In the immediate aftermath of arrest, 21 people were killed and many wounded.

=== Aftermath ===
Within two days of the declaration of the state of emergency, the British cabinet under Harold Macmillan decided to set up a Commission of Inquiry into the disturbances. Macmillan did not choose its chairman, Devlin, and later criticised his appointment on the basis of his Irish ancestry and Catholic upbringing. Macmillan not only broadly rejected the Devlin Report, which had taken several months to prepare, but engineered the production of the rival Armitage Report, which was prepared very quickly so it could be released on the same day as the Devlin Report.

The Devlin Commission concentrated on three areas: the State of Emergency, the murder plot and African opposition to Federation. It found that the declaration of a State of Emergency was necessary to restore order and prevent a descent into anarchy, but it criticised instances of the illegal use of force by the police and troops. It also found that the Nyasaland government's suppression of criticism and of support for Congress justified calling it a "police state". Its strongest criticism was over the "murder plot", which it said not exist, and the use made of it by both the Nyasaland and British governments in trying to justify the Emergency, which it condemned. It also declared that Banda had no knowledge of the inflammatory talk of some Congress activists about attacking Europeans. Finally, it noted the almost universal rejection of Federation by Nyasaland's African people and suggested the British government should negotiate with African leaders on the country's constitutional future.

The Nyasaland government had imprisoned Banda, not realising that he was the only African politician they could negotiate with on a credible constitution for the protectorate. At first, the British government tried to calm the situation by nominating additional African members (who were not Congress supporters) to the Legislative Council. However, it soon decided that the Federation of Rhodesia and Nyasaland could not be maintained and that Nyasaland and Northern Rhodesia should be given responsible government under majority rule. Devlin's conclusion that there was no murder plot and that Banda was not involved in promoting violence opened the way for the British government to deal with him. Banda was released in April 1960 and invited to London to discuss proposals for responsible government.

Chipembere, Dunduzu Chisiza and his brother Yatuta were arrested in the State of Emergency and imprisoned with Banda for 13 months in Gwelo in Southern Rhodesia, but Chiume, who was in London, escaped arrest. This did little to bring Banda and the others together: Banda became concerned with Chipembere's volatile temper, and Banda's increasingly authoritarian attitudes alarmed his three fellow prisoners. Chipembere and the Chisiza brothers remained in detention, first in Rhodesia and later in Nyasaland, after Banda was released. Iain Macleod, the Colonial Secretary was at first suspicious of Banda, and regarded the three others as extremists. He eventually agreed to Banda's request for their release, but they were among the last to be released in September 1960. This was after Banda had returned from constitutional talks in London, where he had been accompanied by Orton Chirwa, a lawyer and Aleke Banda, a young activist. In May 1960, Chiume returned to Nyasaland and his attempts to ingratiate himself with Banda led to his estrangement from Chipembere and the Chisiza brothers. After his release, Chipembere embarked on a series of fiery speeches: the colonial authorities considered these were sufficiently threatening to warrant his arrest, and he was again imprisoned, receiving a three-year sentence in January 1961. Chiume escaped prosecution for his speeches, as he was considered of lower importance. Chipembere was still in prison in August 1961, when Banda (who had insisted on selecting all his party's candidates) won an overwhelming electoral victory. The new Governor, Glyn Smallwood Jones was willing to discuss Chipembere's early release but despite Dunduzu Chisiza's urging, Banda allowed Chipembere to serve much of his sentence until his release in January 1963. In August 1961, Chipembere's father had been elected to the Legislative Council in place of his son, but gave up his seat on Chipembere's release.

== The Malawi Congress Party ==
=== Formation ===
Chirwa and Aleke Banda had only been detained for a short time, and in 1959, they had formed the Malawi Congress Party (MCP) to replace the banned Nyasaland African Congress, making it clear that they were acting on behalf of the imprisoned Banda. The reconstitution of Congress as the Malawi Congress Party from September 1959 marked a major shift in its character. The Nyasaland African Congress was an anti-colonial liberation movement but after the 1961 elections, the MCP was in government. There was a regional shift in support for the MCP: in both the Southern and Central Provinces, people flocked to join the party but, in the north, branches were formed only in a limited number of places. The MCP quickly emerged as a larger party, distinctly more authoritarian in its approach, than Congress had been. It became a mass party, but Chipembere and the Chisizas were unknown to many of the new members, who regarded Banda as the sole leader.

In the 1961 elections, MPC won 22 out of the 28 available Legislative Council seats, including all the "lower roll" seats, which had a predominantly African electorate. The largest group of MPC Legislative Council members was formed of eight who had received at least secondary education, mainly former students; five of the six early ministerial appointments fell to this group. They were generally under 35 (only Chirwa was over 40), and a disproportionate number of these came from the Northern Region, because several mission schools there taught to a high standard. The next group was of local MCP bosses who were generally a decade older than the first group. They were generally less well educated but had stronger local ties, and after the 1964 crisis, several of them replaced the former ministers of the first group. At first, MPC backbench members raised questions on sensitive issues and questioned ministers with relative freedom, but by late 1962, this had ceased and only the few non-MCP Legislative Council members were able to offer any criticism. Banda started to intervene in the speeches of ministers and to cut short debates, arguing that he alone made policy.

Before the elections, the Colonial Office had assumed that MPC would be entitled to three Executive Council seats through winning a majority of the "lower roll" seats. As the Lancaster House agreement provided that two Executive Council seats would go to ministers elected by the "upper roll" of largely European and Asian electors, it was thought that the mainly white United Federal Party would gain both these seats: with five officials also sitting, there would be a non-MCP majority on the Executive Council. In the event, the United Federal Party only won five Legislative Council seats, two going to MPC and one to an MCP-inclined independent, Colin Cameron. The Governor offered the United Federal Party a single Executive Council seat, which it refused. This left all five elected seats for MCP candidates. In theory, Jones, the Governor, was entitled to allocate portfolios, but he allowed Banda to make nominations. Banda decided to take two for himself, becoming both Minister of Natural Resources and Minister of Local Government. Chiume became Minister of Education and Augustine Bwanausi became Minister of Labour. The two upper roll ministers were Colin Cameron (Minister of Works) and Mikeka Mkandawire as Minister without Portfolio. Two MCP parliamentary secretaries were also appointed, but did not sit in the Executive Council. These were Dunduzu Chisiza in the Ministry of Finance and Orton Chirwa in the Ministry of Justice. Two additional appointments were made in March 1962, of John Msonthi and Willie Chokani, and Chirwa became the Minister of Justice and Attorney-general at the start of 1964.

=== In government ===
When Banda and four other MCP ministers joined five officials on the Executive Council, they formed a Responsible government accountable to the Governor. A timetable for full self-government independence was agreed at a constitutional conference in London in 1962 and the Jones allowed Banda and the MPC ministers and parliamentary secretaries, now seven in total, to initiate policies. Nyasaland achieved internal self-government with Banda as Prime Minister in February 1963. Full independence was gained (and the country's name became Malawi) on 6 July 1964, with Banda as Prime Minister. Malawi became a republic within the Commonwealth, on 6 July 1966, when Banda became its first President.

In February 1963, Banda, as Prime Minister, was able to select a cabinet of 10 members to replace the Executive Council. This included the temporary appointment of Henry Phillips the former Financial Secretary as Minister of Finance, the post Dunduzu Chisiza would have taken but for his death in 1962. Other official members left office. Chipembere joined the cabinet as Minister of Local Government, and Chiume added Social Development to his Education post. There were some changes of portfolios: Willie Chokani took over as Minister of Labour, replacing Augustine Bwanausi, who became Minister of the Interior, and John Tembo was made a parliamentary secretary, with the intention of his replacing Phillips, who retired in early 1964. The Governor suggested that Bwanausi had more experience and would be a better choice as Minister of Finance, but Banda was insistent on Tembo. Msonthi and Cameron retained their existing posts and Mkandawire left the cabinet by his own choice. At this time, Aleke Banda, a close aide to Banda, was made MCP secretary-general.

Generally, the MCP ministers were very active in their new roles and, although there was some friction with permanent officials, they were effective Banda, as Minister of Natural Resources (which included farming), introduced three crucial reforms, the abolition of punitive element of conservation practices (although not the conservation measures themselves), the final abolition of thangata through the Africans on Private Estates Act in 1962, and the reform of the marketing of peasant crops. Chiume, the Minister of Education, promoted the expansion of secondary education, the creation of a teacher training college and a polytechnic and sending Malawian students to overseas universities, pending the creation of a university in Malawi. The last led to accusations of favouring fellow-northerners when granting scholarships. Chiume, an abrasive personality, more controversially attacked the hold of the missions on education and insisted on bringing them under greater state control.

=== Banda's leadership ===
Soon after the Lancaster House constitutional conference in 1962, Banda made it clear in the Legislative Council that he alone was responsible for making policy, which the ministers were to execute without debate or dissent. No criticism of Banda was permitted, but Banda allowed ministers to criticise each other and did not counter claims that the significant number of ministers from the north were favouring fellow northerners. Chiume in particular was involved in disputes with Cameron, the Minister of Works and Dunduzu Chisiza the Parliamentary Secretary to the Ministry of Finance. In August 1962, both Cameron and Chisiza offered their resignations to the Governor but were persuaded to remain in post; Chisiza died shortly afterwards. Banda was accused of building-up an entourage based on his own Chewa group, but before the 1963 election, he held the balance between competing MCP factions.

Dunduzu Chisiza had died in September 1962, apparently in a car crash, although many people in Malawi continue to believe he was murdered on Banda's instructions. Although the balance of probabilities is that Chisiza's death was accidental, it is clear that before his death, he saw the possibility of a dictatorship as a major threat. His preference was for a strong central government uniting all sectional interests and allowing dissenting views to be expressed. In a pamphlet written shortly before his death, he argued that, whereas it was necessary for the strong leadership of one individual and acceptance of his decisions during an independence struggle, once independence had been achieved, the former subordinates should cease to be submissive. He considered that a leader surrounded only by willing subordinates would soon become dictatorial; a prescient claim in view of Banda's later actions. Chisiza agreed with Banda on many issues, however on others he dissented more, and more publicly, than any other minister.

== Independence ==
Until Banda was sworn in as Prime Minister on 1 February 1963, the Governor retained the ultimate responsibility for law and order. Immediately after this, despite some attacks by MCP militants on Jehovah's Witnesses and members of opposition parties, the situation was generally calm until the pre-independence election campaign began in late 1963. By January 1964, almost every opposition leader had fled the country and over 1,800 attacks on political opponents of the MPC and Jehovah's Witnesses were recorded in January and February 1964. This violence was orchestrated by local MCP bosses, but Banda did little to stop it,

In July 1963, Banda took over Msonthi's portfolio of Transport and Communication and removed him from the cabinet without giving any reason, although Chipembere later stated it was probable that Msonthi was suspected of corruption, and others mentioned his drinking. At the time, other ministers suspected that Banda had removed Msonthi to test their reaction to an arbitrary sacking. Banda also claimed in cabinet that he had considered dismissing other (unnamed) ministers, and the whole affair increased ministerial insecurity. Msonthi was reappointed to the cabinet in August 1963, and soon after the three MCP regional chairmen were given ministerial status, diluting the influence of existing ministers.

Differences between Banda and the ministers arose for several reasons. Firstly, Banda insisted on making all the important decisions relating to the state and the MCP, including nominating all the candidates for election, and he refused to devolve real responsibility to them. Within the MCP, Banda set up a new committee to strengthen and centralise party discipline, reducing local control. He also became life president of the MCP in February 1963. After the 1963 election, Banda began to make slighting references to the ministers in speeches. Earlier, his criticism had been in private, but on 27 October 1963, he berated them in a long public speech. More privately, he accused Chipembere, Chiume and Bwanausi of forming a cabal against him. In November 1963, he took over Chiume's ministerial responsibilities for Education and Social Development without removing him from the cabinet, where he was given responsibility for the transition to independence. Chipembere then became Minister of Education. Banda later claimed this was done to drive a wedge between Chipembere and Chiume. In a further cabinet reshuffle, Yatutza Chisiza took on Home Affairs and Bwanausi moved to Development and Transport. Banda himself retained the Trade and Industry, Health, Natural Resources and Social Development portfolios as well as being Prime Minister. His holding so many posts and devolving the day-to-day work to parliamentary secretaries was criticised, as was the frequency with which he shifted ministers around. Banda's appointment of his followers to statutory bodies also appeared to diminish the power and influence of existing ministers.

Secondly, Banda continued diplomatic relations with South Africa and Portugal, but refused to recognise the People's Republic of China or East Germany, despite most ministers' ideological concerns, and contemptuously rejected attempts by Chiume and Yatuta Chisiza to form closer ties with Zambia and Tanganyika. Thirdly, the slow pace of Africanization in the Civil Service, the freezing of Civil Service salaries and the introduction of a charge for outpatients at state hospitals were not seen as passing the benefits of independence to the people.

== The Cabinet Crisis ==
=== Initial disagreements ===
Since the Cabinet Crisis of 1964, there has been disagreement on the extent to which rivalries within the MCP in the early 1960s reflected generational and ideological tensions between Dr Banda and his younger ministers or regional divisions. Following the release of the Chisiza brothers and Chipembere in October 1960, the influence of northerners appeared to grow, reaching a peak in September 1961 when Yatuta Chisiza was appointed the party's Administrative Secretary alongside his brother, Dunduzu, the Secretary General; Chiume was Publicity Secretary; Orton Chirwa was Legal Adviser; and Rose Chibambo, the only woman on the party's National Executive, was Chairman of the Woman's League. This apparent northern dominance, masked divisions and politicians born in the north pursued various personal and ideological agendas and did not act as a regional bloc. After the Lancaster House conference made it clear that independence would be achieved, MCP became a more divided party. The focus moved away from achieving independence towards the allocation of resources between ministries and regions. Resentment of the hold that better-educated northerners had on scarce jobs was used by Banda to assert his authority by playing ministers off against one another, but there is no evidence of him adopting a pro-Chewa, anti-northern stance before the 1964 crisis. None of the ministers who resigning in 1964 drew attention to regional distinctions, but Banda's allies from the Central Region accused northern politicians in general and Chiume in particular of favouritism, and voiced Chewa resentment against senior civil servants from the north, many of whom had demonstrated in favour of the former ministers. Rose Chibambo came in for particularly violent abuse, probably because of anti-female as well as anti-northern prejudice.

Colin Cameron, the only European minister remaining at independence on 6 July 1964, stated that, at that time, all the African ministers apart from Chiume had decided to press for rapid Africanization and links with other African states, and to end Banda's dictatorial behaviour. On his return from a visit to Cairo on 26 July, Banda made a public speech threatening ministers; this had the perverse effect of uniting them all, including Chiume. Banda's proposal to reintroduce detention without trial at the cabinet meeting of 29 July 1964 united all the ministers against him, but only Colin Cameron resigned. Chipembere later explained that the other ministers did not resign as detention was a popular issue they could not oppose, but they hoped it would be used sparingly. On 10 August, the ministers attending (Tembo was not present, and Chiume was probably also absent) asked Banda to stop making slighting references to them in speeches and not to hold so many government portfolios himself. Chipembere later recorded that Banda gave them a hearing, but was concerned that they were "ganging up" against him, and was reluctant to meet them as a group. However, Banda appeared to accept their concerns and apologised about the hurtful remarks he had made about them.

=== The ministers complain ===
At the cabinet meeting of 26 August 1964, all the ministers present (including to some degree John Tembo) raised their concerns about Banda's failure to Africanise, his relations with Portugal and South Africa and their own ambiguous position. The ministers present presented Banda with a list of grievances: he made no immediate answer, neither accepting or rejecting what the list contained. Banda was apparently surprised by the strength of the opposition at this cabinet meeting, even though his recent relations with Chipembere and Yatutu Chisiza had been difficult. A number of ministers led by Chisiza apparently wished to convert Banda's role from that of Prime Minister, with an expected progression to become executive President, to be in the future a President without executive functions, with an appointed Prime Minister as head of government. Chiume had been a prominent supporter of Banda and, since 1959, had not been close to the more radical group. However, once Banda had strongly rejected his plan to accept aid from China, Chiume began to attack him, and precipitated the confrontation of 26 August 1964.

The ministers thought that their united stand had been successful. They did not know that Banda had already decided not to agree to their demands, but wanted to test how strong his support was by consulting MCP leaders before taking action. He also had Special Branch reports on the ministers, to assess their likely reaction to the dismissal of some of their colleagues. On 31 August, Banda told his expatriate cabinet secretary that he intended to have no further discussions with the ministers. He intended to resign as Prime Minister, but only because it would automatically end the tenure of the other ministers: on reappointment he would form a new cabinet without Chipembere, Chiume and Chisiza, but with the addition of four new ministers loyal to him. On 1 September, he advised the Governor-General of his intention not to reappoint Chiume or Chisiza: he said Chipembere and Msonthi might also be dropped.

At a further meeting with the ministers, excluding Chipembere who was in Canada, on 2 September 1964, Banda made no concessions to the ministers, and the meeting ended in chaos, with Banda ordering them out of the cabinet room. The ministers then met and proposed that Banda should be forced to resign, with Chirwa becoming Prime minister and Chipembere left out of the cabinet. After the abortive cabinet meeting, Banda contacted the Governor-General, who advised him to seek a vote of confidence in parliament rather than resign. His success there in the Malawi parliament in 1964 was a foregone conclusion, as it had no opposition party members and as all the MCP members were personally nominated by Banda.

=== The confidence vote ===
On 7 September at an informal meeting, Banda appealed to Members of Parliament to support him in a vote of confidence to be held after a debate on 8 and 9 September. Also on 7 September, Banda called upon Sir Glyn Jones, as Governor-General of Malawi to issue dismissal letters to Chirwa, Chiume, and Bwanausi, who all accepted their dismissals with dignity. Rose Chibambo, a parliamentary secretary, was also dismissed. The other cabinet members, except for John Tembo, showed solidarity with their colleagues. On the same day, Yatuta Chisiza, Chokani and, after some hesitation, Msonthi handed their resignations to the Governor-General. Chokani later claimed that Jones urged him not to resign and, after taking advice, Msonthi withdrew his resignation a few hours later: Banda immediately accepted this. Jones then suggested a meeting between the other resigning ministers and Banda, but Chisiza and Chokani declined. It is not clear whether, having dismissed Chiume, Chirwa and Bwanausi, Banda expected Chipembere and Yatutu Chisiza to continue in office, but they resigned. None of the ministers who were dismissed or who had resigned made any significant effort to mobilise support from other Members of Parliament, most of whom owed their nominations to Banda, although they had significant support from African civil servants.

Tembo and Msonthi, the only two cabinet ministers left, opened the debate by proposing the motion of confidence, but Banda's lengthy speech dominated it. In this, he claimed that the ministers had conspired against him, because he had preventing them abusing their positions and because they were being controlled by China's ambassador in Dar es Salaam. In response, only Chiume set out any detailed criticism of Banda, the others concentrated on stating their continued loyalty to him, despite being denounced as traitors. Chipembere returned from Canada on 8 September. Banda had written to him, asking him to remain in the cabinet, but this was before the debate, when Banda was uncertain of what support he had. Chipembere wished to effect a reconciliation between Banda and the ministers, and approached the Governor-General, asking him to request Banda to postpone the debate. However, as the first day of the debate had gone in Banda's favour, he decided against reconciliation and refused a postponement. Chipembere therefore resigned on the morning of 9 September and attended parliament as a back-bencher, sitting with the other ex-ministers. Chipembere's speech deplored the breakdown of party unity and that the ex-ministers had been reviled as traitors. He expressed his general support for their grievances, and although he expressed loyalty to Banda, he pointedly argued that cabinet responsibility should be collective and that there should be consultation on important issues.

The end of the debate was something of an anti-climax, with Banda proclaiming that, "This is not a cabinet crisis at all ...". However, as all members of parliament were required to speak, they had to declare for or against the motion of confidence. Few spoke in favour of the ex-ministers, even their family members. After the debate, Jones suggested that Banda should meet the ex-ministers. Banda was unwilling to meet them as long as they insisted on an all or nothing reinstatement, but he was willing to consider re-instating Chokani and Bwanausi, and possibly Chirwa, but not Chipembere or Chiume. Jones' efforts to enable the reinstatement some of the ministers between September 16 and 18 failed, as did his last-ditch attempt at compromise on September 26, when a meeting planned by Chipembere in Blantyre on that day and the next was banned, ostensibly because he had not obtained police permission. As clashes between supporters of the ex-ministers and Banda began, any hope of reconciliation faded. Over the next few weeks a number of senior civil servants and associates of the former ministers left Malawi as the conflict spread.

Zomba became a centre of support for the ex-ministers and to counteract this on the night of 27/28 September, supporters of Banda from the Youth League of the MCP were bussed into Zomba and tried to close Zomba market and force those civil servants that were on strike back to work. However, the more numerous civil servants, armed themselves with sticks and attacked MCP supporters and burned down the party's national headquarters and a shop owned by the local MCP chairman. During these disturbances, one newly-appointed minister, Albert Muwalo was assaulted by the pro-Chipembere crowd, and another was severely beaten. By 30 September Muwalo and every other minister that supported Banda had left Zomba and supporters of the dismissed ministers remained in control of Zomba until troops and police moved in to restore calm a few days later.

The ministers that had resigned or were dismissed had no coherent plans for resisting Banda and disagreed about what should happen when his powers were reduced. On the other hand, Banda had, in the six years since he had returned to the country, gained control of the MCP where his supporters controlled it in all three regions of Malawi and many districts, and had appointed many of its MPs. In addition, the security forces and police remained loyal, so Banda would have been difficult to dislodge if, as he did, he refused to relinquish power.

== The causes of the Cabinet Crisis ==
Chiume later drew attention to long standing political differences between Banda and the younger generation of MCP leaders, some going back to Banda's return in 1959, although until shortly before the August 1964 crisis, Chiume publicly supported Banda enthusiastically. Chipembere rejected this claim, dating their opposition to the post- independence period when Banda's actions became intolerable to them. Banda claimed in September and October 1964 that the ex-ministers, particularly Chiume and Chipembere, had been plotting to remove him from office and that these plots had been going on for some time. This is unlikely in view of the ministers' lack of agreed objectives and the unplanned nature of their response. The conversion of Chiume from loyalty to Banda bordering on sycophancy at odds with several of his cabinet colleagues to leading cabinet opposition to Banda took place extraordinarily quickly in August 1964, and his actions in leading the opposition to Banda was the nearest thing there was to any concerted plot. Both Chipembere in September and Chirwa in October tried to resolve to the crisis through compromise rather than plotting.

In a paper written by Chipembere (reprinted in Baker), Chipembere ascribes Banda starting to criticise ministers publicly from October 1963 to British administrative and intelligence officers who surrounded Dr. Banda and felt insecure in their jobs. These, said Chipembere, worked for the radicals' dismissal from the cabinet by creating suspicion and distrust in Dr. Banda's mind. He claimed to have found this out when visiting a neighbouring African country around this time, but did not give the source of this information. From February 1963, Banda received monthly reports from the police Special Branch, which he did not share with his cabinet colleagues. A number of these reports were critical of certain specific activities of Chipembere and Chiume.

As Chipembere neither states the source of his information nor is specific about who the British officers surrounding Banda were, it is difficult to evaluate his claims. However, both he and Banda talk in terms of plots and misinformation. This may arise from the prevailing MCP intolerance of any perceived or imagined dissent. From 1956, Chipembere and Chiume promoted mass nationalism and led a major recruiting drive for the Nyasaland African Congress. Even in the early years, elements of a totalitarian ideology intolerant of any dissent started to appear. As Chipembere noted of himself in 1961, he had denounced the multi-party system as "... a system of Government with a built-in subversive mechanism."

Between his release in April 1960 and independence in July 1964, Banda and his followers made MCP into an absolutist body. As early as August 1958, Banda had claimed the right to make all MCP appointments and dismiss any member of the party. He also became its Life President and the centre of a personality cult fostered by Chiume as Publicity Secretary. Members of opposition parties were harassed and assaulted, trade unions were fiercely criticised and there was an attack on mission-based churches in the party newspaper. All were seen as rivals to MCP, even Jehovah's Witnesses, whose movement was detached from politics, and whose members declined to join MCP. All forms of political intolerance and violence increased before the 1963 pre-independence elections.

In May 1964, Chiume looked forward to Malawi being organised with no opposition at all and claimed that there was nothing wrong with dictatorship. Banda went further in saying that any government chosen by the people themselves was not a dictatorship. By the time that many of the ministers had concerns about the reintroduction of Preventive Detention in July 1964, the possibility of reasoned opposition to Banda was long past. The Cabinet Crisis did not therefore represent any change in the nature of MCP, merely that, as external enemies had been subdued, its leader made enemies of the party's own long-term members.

== After the crisis and Chipembere's revolt ==
=== The ministers leave ===
In October 1964, Chokani and Bwanausi, who had refused to rejoin the cabinet without their colleagues, left voluntarily for Zambia following Banda's refusal to negotiate. Chiume and Chisiza, who had gone to the north of Malawi in September, both crossed into Tanzania (as Tanganyika had become) on 1 October because they feared for their safety. Chirwa met Banda in the hope of serving as a judge but was beaten up by Banda's guards, and went into hiding before leaving secretly for Tanzania on 22 October. Chipembere had remained at his home in Fort Johnston District, avoiding any contact with Banda or Jones, under the protection of numerous local supporters. On 25 October, Banda claimed at an MPC meeting that the ex-ministers were plotting to overthrow him by force. Chipembere left his house on 28 October to go into hiding, following which Banda ordered his arrest, "... alive if possible, but if not alive then any other way." After Cameron had resigned in July 1964, he was advised to leave the country in November 1964, and returned to Scotland.

The British government thought an outcome to the crisis in which Banda shed some of his powers to the ministers but remained in charge would be ideal but, failing that, it was prepared to back him against his ministers. There was the fear that Chipembere and Chiume would align Malawi too closely with China, whereas Banda would be more favourable to British interests. Sir Glyn Jones, as Governor-General of Malawi was in a difficult position as he could only advise and had no executive power. In September 1964, his frequent meeting with Banda and the ministers, except for Chiume (who refused to meet him), both before and after they left office, were aimed at an accommodation between Banda and at least some of the ministers. His constitutional duty was however to support Banda once he had won the vote of confidence. Chipembere later claimed that expatriate civil servants and security officers had turned Banda against him and his colleagues. While there is little doubt that many expatriates preferred Banda to Chipembere and Chiume, there is no real evidence that they caused this estrangement.

=== Armed conflict ===
Although there was widespread dissatisfaction in the north of Malawi, there was no major uprising there after the Cabinet Crisis. There was concern that Chiume and Chisiza would mount an invasion from Tanzania, but the armed uprising was in the south. After Chipembere went into hiding in the east of Fort Johnston District, he gathered a group of supports including politicians, civil servants and young activists which controlled much of the district. He set up a training camp and on the night of 12 February 1965 led about 200 supporters into Fort Johnston to attack the police station. They then attempted to reach the capital, Zomba, around 160 kilometres (100 mi) away. Chipembere's exact intentions are unknown, but he may have hoped that the army based in Zomba would come out in support of the rising. His small force was stopped at the Liwonde ferry by security forces and, after some fighting, it fled in disorder.

Although there was a reward for his capture, Chipembere was able to remain in the Fort Johnston District until March when, ill with diabetes, he wrote to Sir Glyn Jones, the Governor-General of Malawi offering to leave Malawi in return for an amnesty. Banda at first rejected this, but after Chipembere contacted the US ambassador in early April, it was arranged (with Banda's consent) that he should leave Malawi and travel, through Southern Rhodesia and London, to the USA. He agreed not to plot against Banda there. Chipembere later claimed that an amnesty had been promised for his followers, but many of them were detained and a few continued raids on government targets for some time, leading to retaliatory burning of local villages and the public hanging of one of the leaders in January 1966. Many of Chipembere supporters were Yao and Banda promoted the recruitment of members of the rival Lomwe group as paramilitary police to contain them. During and after the suppression of Chipembere's armed uprising, several hundred civil servants were sacked, or detained along with other of his supposed supporters, and chiefs suspected of sympathising with him were deposed.

There had been a minor incursion from Tanzania in March 1965 by fighters loyal to Yatuta Chisiza, when two of his fighters were killed. In September 1967, Chisiza himself led a force of less than 20 that had trained in Zambia through Mozambique into the Mwanza District. They were spotted by police on 3 October and nine were captured over the next few days. Chisiza himself was killed in a shoot-out with troops on 11 October and his corpse was publicly displayed on Banda's orders.

== The fates of the ministers ==
Several of the ministers that fled from Malawi after the Cabinet Crisis died abroad, but a number survived to return to Malawi after Banda was deposed and returned to public life. Several of those that had supported Banda at the time of the cabinet crisis later suffered demotion, dismissal or imprisonment at his hands. One of the new ministers appointed after the Cabinet Crisis in 1964, Albert Muwalo, was hanged for treason in 1976.

Chipembere first studied at the University of California, Los Angeles (UCLA), then taught in Tanzania from 1966 to 1969, before returning to UCLA to complete his doctorate and receive treatment for diabetes. He later taught at the California State University. Between 1970 and 1975, he worked on his autobiography, which was incomplete on his death. He died on 24 September 1975 from complications of his diabetes without returning to Malawi. After Banda was removed in 1993, Chipembere's reputation was rehabilitated.

Chiume was in exile in Tanzania from 1964 to 1994, where he became active in journalism and set up a political movement aimed at promoting change in Malawi. He returned to Malawi in 1994 after Banda's removal and became chairman of the Malawi National Library Service until he retired in 1996. He then lived in his home district of Nkhata Bay until 2002, when he moved to New York because of his health, and died there on 21 November 2007.

Orton Chirwa settled in Tanzania, where he taught and practised law. On Christmas Eve 1981, Chirwa, his wife, Vera and their son were abducted from Zambia by Malawian security officials, possibly after being tricked into going to the border area. Two years later Orton and Vera Chirwa were put on trial for treason in a "traditional" court and not allowed defence counsel. They were found guilty and sentenced to death, but after many appeals for clemency this was commuted to life in prison. Orton Chirwa died in Zomba prison on 20 October 1992, after nearly 11 years in solitary confinement. When he died, he was virtually deaf and blind.

Willie Chokani and Augustine Bwanausi left for Zambia in October 1964, where they became schoolteachers. Chokani became a headmaster of a secondary school and a college lecturer before moving to Tanzania where he was active in Malawian exile politics. He returned to Malawi in 1993 and was Malawi's Ambassador to the US from 1994 to 1999, then Ambassador to Ethiopia and High Commissioner to Namibia before his retirement. Bwanausi remained as a teacher in Zambia until his death in a car accident in 1973.

After her dismissal as parliamentary secretary and from the Women's League, Rose Chibambo resigned as an MP and joined her husband who was in the district administration of Chiradzulu and later Mwanza, but after threats from MCP members, they both fled to Zambia in early 1965. Her husband died in Zambia in 1968, but she survived to return to Malawi in 1994. Msonthi took over Chipembere's former post as Minister for Education, and served in several cabinet posts until his removal on charges of breaching MCP party discipline in 1973. He was internally exiled to his home district for five years, before partial rehabilitation and being given a post in a government parastatal, which he held until his death in 1982.

Aleke Banda, who had become Secretary-General of MCP in 1962, became a cabinet minister in 1962, and served in three cabinet posts before being dismissed by Banda in 1973. In 1975, he was appointed managing director of Press Holdings Ltd, a company controlled by Banda but in 1979 was detained without charge for 12 years. After Banda's removal, he re-entered politics in opposition to MCP, and between 1997 and 2005 held two cabinet posts. He retired through illness in 2005 and died from leukaemia in 2010. John Tembo ceased to be a cabinet minister in 1971, becoming Governor of the Reserve Bank of Malawi but retaining his MCP position. In 1982, Tembo left the Reserve Bank and, although he held no ministerial office until 1989, he was a close advisor to Banda and held a number of posts in parastatal bodies. In 1989, he became MCP treasurer and again held ministerial office. In 1995 he was accused, along with Banda of murder, but acquitted. After 1994, Tembo remained with MCP and in politics, and served as Malawi's Leader of the Opposition.

== Published sources ==
- C Baker, (1997). State of Emergency: Nyasaland 1959,, I.B.Tauris. ISBN 1-86064-068-0.
- C Baker, (2000). Sir Glyn Jones, A Proconsul in Africa, I.B. Tauris, London. ISBN 978-1-86064-461-0.
- C Baker, (2001). Revolt of the Ministers: The Malawi Cabinet Crisis 1964–1965, IB Tauris. ISBN 978-1-86064-642-3.
- C Baker, (2006). Chipembere, the Missing Years, African Books Collective ISBN 978-99908-76-33-8.
- C Baker (2007). The Mechanics of Rebuttal: The British and Nyasaland Governments' Response to The Devlin Report, 1959, The Society of Malawi Journal, Vol. 60, No. 2.
- M L Chanock, (1975). Ambiguities in the Malawian Political Tradition, African Affairs Vol.74 No.296.
- A Horne, (2008) Macmillan: The Official Biography, Pan Macmillan. ISBN 0-230-73881-8.
- O J M Kalinga, (2012). Historical Dictionary of Malawi, Rowman and Littlefield. ISBN 978-0-8108-5961-6.
- J McCracken, (1998). Democracy and Nationalism in Historical Perspective: The Case of Malawi, African Affairs Vol. 97, No. 387
- J McCracken, (2002). The Ambiguities of Nationalism: Flax Musopole and the Northern Factor in Malawian Politics, c. 1956–1966, Journal of Southern African Studies, Vol. 28, No. 1.
- J McCracken, (2012). A History of Malawi, 1859–1966, Woodbridge, James Currey. ISBN 978-1-84701-050-6.
- J G Pike, (1968) Malawi: A Political and Economic History, Pall Mall.
- J Power, (2010). Political Culture and Nationalism in Malawi: Building Kwacha, University of Rochester Press, ISBN 978-1-58046-310-2.
- A C Ross, (2009). Colonialism to Cabinet Crisis: a Political History of Malawi,, African Books Collective. ISBN 978-99908-87-75-4.
- R. I. Rotberg, (1965). The Rise of Nationalism in Central Africa: The Making of Malawi and Zambia, 1873–1964, Cambridge (Mass), Harvard University Press.
- J van Velson, (1966). Some Early Pressure Groups in Malawi. in E Stokes and R Brown, (editors). The Zambezian Past: Studies in Central African History. Manchester University Press.
