= Henry Masauko Blasius Chipembere =

Malawian politician (1930–1975)

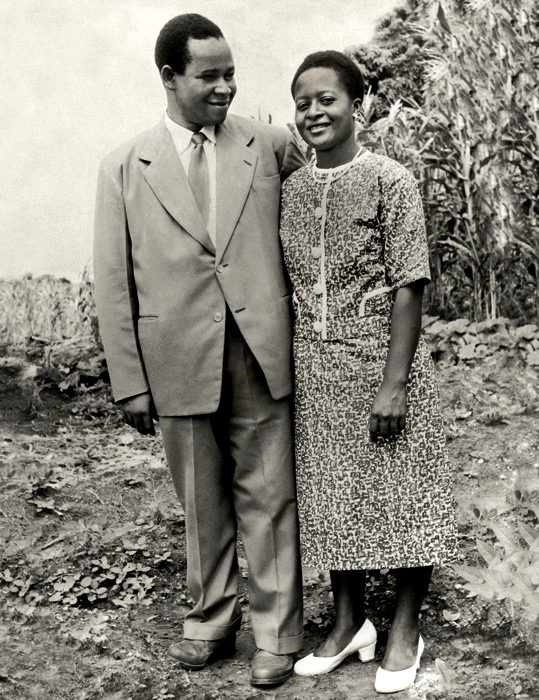
- Born: August 5, 1930; Nkhotakota District, Nyasaland (present day Malawi)
- Died: September 24, 1975 (aged 45); Los Angeles, California, U.S.
- Occupation: Politician
- Spouse: Catherine Chipembere

Henry Masauko Blasius Chipembere (5 August 1930 – 24 September 1975) was a Malawian nationalist politician who played a significant role in bringing independence from colonial rule to his native country, formerly known as Nyasaland. From an early age Chipembere was a strong believer in natural justice and, on his return in 1954 from university in South Africa, he joined his country's independence struggle as a nationalist strategist and spokesman. In 1957, considering that the independence movement needed a strong leader similar to Kwame Nkrumah, and considering himself too young for this task, he joined with other young nationalists in inviting Hastings Kamuzu Banda to return to Nyasaland as the movement's leader.

From 1958, Chipembere orchestrated a campaign of civil disobedience against the colonial authorities that Banda insisted should be non-violent, but which the younger leaders allowed to become more violent, and which eventually led the governor of Nyasaland to declare a state of emergency over the whole protectorate in March 1959. This led to the arrest of Chipembere, Banda and other leaders of the Nyasaland African Congress and the deportation 72 of them to Southern Rhodesia, to the banning of the Congress party and to at least 51 African civilian deaths. Chipembere was regarded as a dangerous militant and imprisoned until late 1960: shortly after his release, he was prosecuted for sedition and imprisoned again until early 1963. Despite policy disagreements with Banda, on his second release Chipembere became a minister in Banda's cabinet in the run up to independence in July 1964. Barely a month later, Banda's autocratic style led to the Cabinet Crisis of 1964 in Malawi, when a majority of ministers who had voiced opposition to his style of government and several of his policies were sacked or resigned. Chipembere was not initially involved in this dispute and, although he did resign in sympathy with his colleagues, he attempted reconciliation during September 1964, until he and other ex-ministers were forced to leave the capital, Zomba, because of the hostility of Banda's supporters. After several months in Fort Johnston district, he and a few hundred supporters attempted an armed revolt in February 1965, which soon failed.

Chipembere was ill with diabetes and, with British government support and Banda's consent, he was taken to California to study and for treatment. He then taught in Tanzania before returning to California in 1969 to complete his doctorate and for further diabetes treatment, and he later taught at California State University. He died in exile in Southern California, of complications arising from diabetes.

== Early life and career ==
Chipembere's father, Habil Matthew Chipembere, was a teacher from a prosperous Nyanja family, who was studying for the priesthood in the Church of the Province of Central Africa, a part of the Anglican Communion at the time of Henry's birth. Henry Chipembere was born in Kayoyo, then in Kota kota district, now Ntchisi district, in the Central Region of Nyasaland (now Malawi). His mother, Drusilla Salim, gave him the name "Masauko", which means "suffering" or "troubles", because it had been a difficult pregnancy.

He was educated at Blantyre Secondary School, which also produced his wife, Catherine, and his later ministerial colleagues Augustine Bwanausi and Willie Chokani, up to School Certificate level. As university entrance generally required the Higher School Certificate, which was not offered at any school in Nyasaland at that time, around ten students from Nyasaland were sent each year to schools in Southern Rhodesia to complete their education, and Chipembere spent 1950 and 1951 under this scheme at Goromonzi secondary school in Southern Rhodesia (now Zimbabwe), before proceeding to Fort Hare college in South Africa in 1952, from which he graduated in late 1954. For a little more than a year after returning, he worked in the colonial civil service as one of the first two African Assistant District Commissioners, and he served under local District Commissioners, first at Domasi and then at Fort Johnston (now Mangochi), both in the Southern Province, and finally at Dedza in the Central Province.

On 30 December 1954, soon after his return from Fort Hare, he attended an informal meeting in Blantyre, with like-minded young Nyasaland Africans, including Kanyama Chiume, many of whom decided to ally themselves with the Nyasaland African Congress (NAC). This was a gradualist political organisation at that time, that had become almost moribund by 1950 but had revived under the vice-presidency and later presidency of James Frederick Sangala. It was, however, dominated by an earlier generation of politicians who had been with Congress since the 1940s and were demoralized by the party's failure to prevent the federation, in 1953, of Nyasaland with Southern and Northern Rhodesia. After his election as president in 1954, Sangala had angered some NAC members by allowing two NAC candidates to be elected to the Federal Parliament, and a number of them tried to unseat him.

In 1955, the governor considered that it was necessary to convince the African population the Federation was in their best interests and allay their fears. Accordingly, the Nyasaland government, with Colonial Office approval, increased the number of seats reserved for Africans on the Legislative Council from three to five. These African members would be nominated by Provincial Councils: although the Provincial Councils were largely composed of chiefs, their members were receptive to popular wishes, and they nominated Congress members or its supporters to the Legislative Council. In March 1956, aged only 25, Henry Chipembere resigned his civil service post in order to stand for election. He was elected by an overwhelming majority to represent the Southern Province, along with Chiume for the Northern Province, Ralph Chinyama, N D Kwenje and Dunstan Chijozi (who was a sympathizer, but not a member of, the NAC). The council also included eleven official government members, headed by the Governor, and six non-official European members (so-called unofficials).

Chipembere and Chiume seized the initiative in the Legislative Council with their outspoken and aggressive participation in its proceedings. The existing members, mostly European, had conducted proceedings with traditional British decorum and restraint, and presumably expected the new members to behave similarly; but these two asked awkward questions and made radical proposals which unsettled and embarrassed the existing membership. Their assault on colonial policies and condemnation of Federation turned the transcripts of the council's proceedings in Hansard, into a bestseller, particularly among young Africans, who were totally unaccustomed to seeing other Africans challenging the colonial authority so openly. Chipembere later said that his behaviour here was inspired by Hastings Kamuzu Banda, whose speeches in London five years earlier against the Federation of Nyasaland with Southern and Northern Rhodesia had been similarly daring and inflammatory. In April 1955, at the 11th annual conference of the NAC, Chipembere and Chiume proposed secession from the Federation as official policy.

In November 1956, Chipembere wrote to Banda, then in semi-retirement in the Gold Coast (later Ghana), asking for his support in getting two African MPs, Manoah Chirwa and Clement Kumbikano, to resign from the Federal Assembly in Rhodesia, something which they had allegedly undertaken to do once they had officially protested against Federation in the assembly on Congress's behalf. Chipembere felt that their participation in the Federal Assembly weakened the Nyasaland African case for seceding from the Federation, which they had been adamantly and overwhelmingly opposed to in the first place. Banda, who had always regarded participation in the Federal Assembly as a betrayal, temporized and counselled patience, but Chipembere and Chiume nevertheless, on December 31, 1956, put a motion before Congress proposing that Chirwa and Kumbikano should be ordered to step down. In an eleven-hour debate, however, their motion was defeated, in part it is thought, because of the opposition of older members of Congress who regarded Chipembere and Chiume as too young and inexperienced to be taken seriously. It was probably this that determined the younger element to ask Banda, an older and highly respected man who had spent his entire adult life away from his native Nyasaland, to return and lead the campaign for secession (and ultimately independence).

In January 1957, Sangala was persuaded to resign, and was replaced as President of Congress by Thamar Dillon Thomas Banda, known as T D T Banda, who was initially supported by Chipembere, Chiume and other young NAC members, and a youth movement called "the Kwaca Boys", which was later transformed into the Congress Youth League. In March 1957, T D T Banda went to the Gold Coast to participate in that country's independence celebrations, and while he was there, he visited Hastings Banda in order to try to persuade him to return. Banda was still reluctant, and two weeks later Chipembere wrote him a letter repeating the request. Later that year, partly in response to further moves by Sir Roy Welensky, the Prime Minister of the Federation, towards attaining dominion status for the Federation (which would make secession by Nyasaland very much harder to achieve), Banda finally agreed to return, but only on conditions which essentially gave him autocratic powers in Congress. Banda also threw his weight behind the demand for the resignation of the two Federal MPs, which happened shortly thereafter. One of Hastings Banda's preconditions was that he would become President of Congress, and the way for this was cleared when, in March 1958, T D T Banda was suspended over financial irregularities, a move orchestrated by Chipembere and Chiume, and was later removed from office.

In June 1958, Chipembere, Dunduzu Chisiza and Chief Kutanja joined Banda in meeting the Colonial Secretary, Alan Lennox-Boyd, in London to discuss a new constitution for Nyasaland (one which had already been roundly rejected by Nyasaland's governor, Robert Armitage). Lennox-Boyd ‘took note’ of their views but said he did not think Congress represented Nyasaland African opinion.

The following month, on 6 July 1958, Banda returned to Nyasaland after an absence of 42 years. At the Congress Annual General Meeting at Nkhata Bay on 1 August 1958, Banda was named President of the Congress, and he nominated Chipembere as Treasurer General. The campaign for independence began in earnest. Chipembere and most other leading Congress activists were in their late 20s or early 30s, but Banda was over 60. As well as the age difference, there was disagreement about Banda's role: the activists saw him as a figurehead, but he saw himself as the leader of Congress and expected their obedience. At that meeting, Banda also demanded and was given the power to appoint and dismiss all other party officers and members of its executive. Banda also appointed Chiume as Publicity Secretary, Dunduzu Chisiza as Secretary-general and four other young radicals to the party's executive committee, ignoring older moderates. However, he made it clear that he regarded his appointees as subordinates, not colleagues.

== Fight for independence ==
Chipembere, Chiume and the two Chisiza brothers (Dunduzu and Yatuta) played a critical role in organizing Congress as a mass political party and creating support for Banda. Banda hitherto had been known mostly only by the educated minority in the country, although there was some awareness of his story among many of the people. They toured the country speaking to crowds assembled by the newly energized Congress. In quite a few cases, this resulted in unrest, intimidation of opponents and rioting.

In the latter part of 1958, Banda presented Congress proposals for an African majority in the Legislative Council to the governor, Sir Robert Armitage. As this would have led to a demand for withdrawal from the Federation, Armitage rejected them, although Banda continued to confer with the governor and leading officials on proposed constitutional changes. A final round of talks in the first days of January 1959 was abortive, and this impasse led to demands from Congress activists for more violent anti-government action, with their leaders including Chipembere making increasingly inflammatory statements, urging direct and potentially violent action. On 24 and 25 January 1959, there was a clandestine outdoor meeting of Congress held in Banda's absence at Limbe near Blantyre, which became known as the "bush meeting". In a letter sent to Chiume in the following week, Chipembere wrote that "for the first time, Congress adopted 'action' as the official policy – and 'action' in the real sense of action". This letter was published as an appendix to the report of the Devlin Commission investigating disturbances in Nyasaland, and it clearly suggested action to defy the colonial authorities.

It was alleged that the Congress members present had discussed using violence and intimidation of opponents as a means of furthering their push for independence. The Governor also received reports from police informers, only one of which attended the meeting, which claimed that Congress planned the indiscriminate killing of Europeans, Asians and its African opponents, the so-called "murder plot". There is no credible evidence that a murder plot as suggested by the police ever existed, but the refusal of Banda or other Congress leaders to condemn the violent actions of Congress members gave some plausibility to the allegation. Chipembere later admitted he had misled the Devlin Commission as to the level of violence he was prepared to sanction, and it is possible that he, Chisiza and a few extremists had discussed killing the governor and leading civil servants. However, such a proposal was not put to or approved by the meeting in general, so the majority of attendees examined by the commission could truthfully report that they heard no suggestion made there such as Armitage reported to British ministers.

Armitage decided to suspend negotiations without making any concessions and prepared for mass arrests, and on 20 February, troops from Rhodesia were flown to Nyasaland to assist in the planned detentions without trial. On February 20 and in the days following, both Chipembere and Yatuta Chisiza made a number of provocative speeches and on 20 February 1959 itself, Chipembere addressed a crowd at Ndirande near Blantyre, following which the crowd threw stones at passing motorists. Other disturbances followed, and the police or troops fired on some of these, leading to four deaths.

Finally, on 3 March 1959, Armitage declared a State of Emergency over the whole of the protectorate and arrested Banda, other members of the Congress executive committee and over a hundred local party officials. The Nyasaland African Congress was banned the next day and Chipembere and Chiume were later removed from the Legislative Council. Rather than calming the situation immediately, fifty-one Africans were recorded as killed and many more were wounded, some of whom died later, in the days immediately following the declaration of the emergency. Many of the arrests were made early in the morning of 3 March 1959, and the sweep was known as Operation Sunrise; by the end of the day most principal Congress leaders had been arrested and detained. Some were released very quickly, but 72 prominent detainees, including Banda, were flown to be detained in Southern Rhodesia. Chipembere, together with Banda and the Chisiza brothers, was imprisoned in Gwelo (now Gweru), in Southern Rhodesia (now Zimbabwe). These senior members of Congress were housed in the European wing of the jail, separate from the lower-level detainees. There, Chipembere studied history, politics, and philosophy, and he and the other Congress inmates, including Dr Banda, discussed their plans for an independent Nyasaland. However, there were some tensions: Banda became concerned with Chipembere's volatile temper, and Banda's increasingly authoritarian attitudes alarmed his three fellow prisoners.

The mood in Britain, meanwhile, had been moving toward relinquishing the colonies. Banda was released from prison in April 1960 and was almost immediately invited to London for talks at Lancaster House aimed at bringing about constitutional changes. Chipembere remained in prison, though he, along with others, was moved from Gwelo to Kanjedza near Blantyre in Nyasaland. In August 1960, while governor Robert Armitage was on leave and the more sympathetic Glyn Jones was Acting Governor, Banda began pressing for the release of Chipembere and the Chisiza brothers. There was some resistance; many Europeans including Iain Macleod, the Colonial Secretary, regarded these three as violent extremists, and the month of August had seen further violent incidents. On 27 September, however, they were grudgingly freed, being among the last detainees to be released. They went immediately to Kota Kota, where the annual Malawi Congress Party (the new name of the Nyasaland African Congress) conference was being held. There, Banda produced them to the assembled but unsuspecting conference, wearing the red gowns of the ‘prison graduate’ and ‘camp finalist’. Chipembere was reinstated as Treasurer General of the party, and Banda was made Life President of the party.

Despite Banda's release, tension in Nyasaland remained at a high level throughout 1960. Although the new Governor, Glyn Smallwood Jones regarded Banda as non-violent, he considered many of his lieutenants, including Chipembere to be men of violence. In a directive to Provincial Commissioners of September 1960, Jones urged government officials to work with Congress and ignore minor infractions of the law, while not tolerating major breaches of the peace, a proviso interpreted as allowing the prosecution of those openly promoting violence. Chipembere, and Chiume who was also released in September 1960, made a number of intemperate speeches against African opponents, calling at a 4 December 196o public meeting near Blantyre for Congress members to kill enemies of the party, which was followed by the burning of a leading opponent's house. Later in December, Chipembere delivered a speech in Rumphi in which he said (according to the Nyasaland Times of 3 February 1961), with reference to a European member of the Legislative Council, "Give me the living body of Blackwood to tear to pieces. I'll do the job in two minutes". He was tried for sedition as a result of this speech and sentenced to three years in prison, and served two years in Zomba jail before his release in January 1963. While he was imprisoned, his father, by now Archdeacon in the Malawi Anglican church, assumed the seat that Chipembere had recently regained on the Legislative Council. Because he was in prison, Chipembere was unable to participate in the constitutional talks which brought about a general election, with full adult suffrage, in August 1961.

Although several elected Congress members had agitated for Chipembere's early release, and the Governor, Glyn Jones, was willing to discuss this, according to some reports had Banda deliberately avoided acting on an alleged undertaking to do so, despite Dunduzu Chisiza urging him to, because he feared the young activist would disrupt progress towards full independence. Banda was not forceful in pressing Jones to release Chipembere, and he only did so after the latter had served much of his sentence, although Banda later claimed credit for securing his early release. The Governor wanted to ensure that Chipembere was released before February 1963, otherwise he would have been ineligible to become a minister when Banda's cabinet was sworn in.

On 1 February 1963, Banda and his cabinet were sworn in, and the recently released Chipembere was given the post of Minister of Local Government: he later became Minister for Education. Shortly afterwards, Banda sent Chipembere, together with Chiume, on a two-month course of study in America, partly, it is thought, to allow the excitement generated by his release to die down, and partly to avoid the risk of further disturbances during the run-up to full independence. This did not stop him for long, however. By June, he was making speeches at Port Herald (now Nsanje) and Chikwawa inciting more violence against "capricorns" and "stooges".

Malawi achieved independence finally on 6 July 1964.

== The Cabinet crisis ==
The first policy issue that divided Banda from Chipembere and his ministerial colleagues was Banda's insistence on continuing diplomatic relations with South Africa and Portugal, contrasted with a refusal to recognise the People's Republic of China or East Germany, despite most ministers' ideological opposition to his pragmatism, and his contemptuously rejection of attempts by Chiume and Yatuta Chisiza to form closer ties with Zambia and Tanganyika. Next was the slow pace of Africanization in the Civil Service and the freezing of Civil Service salaries. Although most ministers agitated for the wholesale replacement of expatriate civil servants by Malawians, Banda insisted on the retention of the former until suitably-qualified Malawians were available and he supported the commission of inquiry recommendation freezing or reduction of many Civil Service salaries, the eliminating or reducing a number of their allowances and introducing a compulsory pension scheme in line with the commission's Skinner Report. Finally, Banda insisted on the introduction of a charge for outpatients at state hospitals, against strong ministerial opposition. Within a few weeks of independence, Banda also demoted one minister, John Msonthi, from membership of the cabinet and, on 29 July, proposed the reintroduction of detention without trial, which the ministers feared might be used against them.

Shortly after these initial tensions, on 19 August 1964, Chipembere left Malawi for a conference in Canada. Meanwhile, back in Malawi, cabinet members including Orton Chirwa, Chiume, Yatuta Chisiza and others (with some limited support from John Tembo, Minister of Finance), were growing restive under Banda's autocratic leadership style. They had several grievances against him, including that he had too much power (he was in charge of six different ministries) and that he treated his cabinet with too little respect, even in public. Matters came to a head on 24 August, when those ministers presented him with what they called the Kuchawe Manifesto (because it had been written at the Kuchawe Hotel (now renamed the Ku Chawe Inn) on Zomba plateau), which was a letter containing a list of their demands. On 7 September, Banda dismissed three of the protesting cabinet members (Orton Chirwa, Kanyama Chiume, and Augustine Bwanausi) and also Rose Chibambo, a Parliamentary Secretary, who was the only female minister. Three other cabinet members, (Yatuta Chisiza, Willie Chokani and John Msonthi who had only recently been reinstated), resigned on the same day, causing the Cabinet Crisis of 1964. On September 8, parliament began to debate a motion of confidence in Dr Banda and his policies. Chipembere arrived back from Canada that evening, having been joined at Dar es Salaam by Qabaniso Chibambo, the Regional Minister for northern Malawi, who urged him to make a last attempt at reconciling Banda and the ministers. As soon as he reached Zomba, he contacted Glyn Jones to assist him in persuading Banda to delay the second stage of the parliamentary debate and to meet the ministers who had been sacked or resigned to discuss a reconciliation.

After failing to persuade Banda to postpone the start of the debate's second day, Chipembere resigned his cabinet position in sympathy with his colleagues on the morning of 9 September, and retired to the back benches. His speech on the second day of the debate was delivered with restraint and expressed regret that the dispute could not be settled by discussion in cabinet, adding that it was absurd of certain MPs to describe the ex-ministers, most of whom had suffered detention to secure independence, as traitors. His speech failed to sway Banda's supporters in parliament who, jealous of the rapid rise of the young graduate ministers or moved by Banda's oratory, gave him a unanimous vote of confidence. Banda used his power as MCP President to remove the ex-ministers first from the MCP executive and on 15 September to suspend them from the party altogether. Although some ex-ministers acted with caution, Chipembere made a defiant speech following his resignation at Fort Johnston (now Mangochi), where he had a considerable support, complaining about the slow pace of Africanisation, and held a celebration of his suspension from the MCP on 19 September in Blantyre, where he criticised Banda's policies. Efforts to reinstate some of the ministers with Glyn Jones' help between 16 and 18 September failed, as did a lat-ditch attempt on 26 September, when a meeting planned by Chipembere in Blantyre on that day and the next was banned, ostensibly because he had not obtained police permission. There were clashes with Malawi Youth League members in Blantyre and in Zomba on 25 and 26 September, the second after Chipembere had addressed his supporters on Zomba. After these disturbances, he left for Fort Johnston District, where popular support for him was strong.

The following week was tense throughout the country, and Zomba became a centre of support for the ex-ministers with many African government employees there going on strike, and senior civil servants (almost all Europeans) staying at home, fearing violence. To counter this, supporters of Banda were transported to Zomba on the night of 27/28 September, and they tried to close Zomba market and force the striking civil servants back to work. However, many African civil servants armed themselves with sticks, attacked and drove out the outnumbered MCP supporters, burned down the party's headquarters and assaulted two newly appointed ministers. By 30 September every minister that supported Banda had left Zomba and supporters of the dismissed ministers remained in control of the town until troops and police moved in to restore calm a few days later.

Although Chipembere later claimed that expatriate civil servants and security officers had turned Banda against him and his colleagues, and used their control of the army and police to defeat them, there is no evidence that expatriate officials submitted misleading reports to Banda or gave him biased advice, and Glyn Jones, other senior officials and the British High Commissioner worked toward a compromise were Banda retained most of his powers but respected his ministers and gave them more responsibility. However, if it had come to a choice between Banda, who had played a central role in Malawi gaining independence and appeared to be a pragmatic moderate, and the ex-ministers including Chipembere and Chiume, who the British government regarded as men of violence and likely to destabilise Malawi, Banda would have been preferred. The ministers who had resigned or were dismissed disagreed about what should happen after Banda's powers were reduced and had no clear strategy for resisting him when he refused to give up power. On the other hand, Banda had, in the six years since he had returned to Malawi, gained control of the MCP where his supporters controlled its three region organisations and those of many districts; he had personally chosen many of its MPs. In addition, the security forces and police remained loyal, so Banda would have been difficult to dislodge once he refused to surrender any of his power.

On 30 September, Banda signed an order restricting Chipembere to within four miles of his home in Malindi in Fort Johnston District, although Chipembere's supporters in the district ensured that he could move about the district freely. On 25 October, Banda claimed at an MPC meeting that the ex-ministers were plotting to overthrow him by force. Chipembere left his house on 28 October to go into hiding, following which Banda claimed he had run away and ordered his arrest, "…alive if possible, but if not alive then any other way." By his own later account, Chipembere claimed his original intention was to organise a campaign of civil disobedience and, up to late October 1964, his supporters kept most pro-Banda loyalists out of Fort Johnston District. However, when Chipembere went into hiding in a remote forest area north of Malindi, he created a training camp to prepare his followers for an armed insurrection. His actual intentions were unclear, but he may have hoped that African members of the police and army would mutiny against their expatriate commanders and that there would be an almost bloodless coup.

On the night of 12 February 1965, Chipembere together with about 200 local supporters moved into Fort Johnston. According to Banda's speech of 6 April 1965 in Hansard (a government publication and possibly not an unbiased source), they attacked the police station, killing the wife and child of the unpopular head of Special Branch there, destroyed telephone installations, both there and at the post office, and removed guns and ammunition from the police armoury. They then moved in the direction of the capital, Zomba, but found that the ferry vessel at Liwonde Ferry was secured on the farther side of the Shire River. With no prospect of reaching Zomba before government forces were alerted, they retreated to Fort Johnston, where a detachment of the Malawi army caught up with them at noon the next day, killing or capturing several of Chipembere's men, although the majority escaped into the bush. Subsequently, the army pushed on to the training camp where they discovered a list of 300 Chipembere supporters, 50 of whom were soon captured by the security forces. This ended Chipembere's attempt at a coup d'état. Many of Chipembere supporters were Yao, and Banda promoted the recruitment of members of the rival Lomwe group as paramilitary police to contain them, stirring up ethnic tensions

For the next two months, despite the offer of a large reward for his arrest, Chipembere moved freely around Fort Johnston District, however, he was ill with untreated diabetes. In March 1965, Chipembere, acting through the good offices of Governor General, Glyn Jones, made overtures to Banda to proclaim an amnesty for his supporters, including those already in prison, in exchange for his agreement to leave the country and not to conspire against Banda in the future. However, Banda was adamant that no such amnesty should be given, and moved to enact retrospective changes to the law on treason, including imposing a mandatory death sentence. Chipembere also approached the US ambassador to Malawi, Sam Gilstrap, asking him to arrange a university place for him in the US. On 26 April, with the help of both Glyn Jones and US interests, the loan of an aircraft from the British South Africa Police, and with Banda's knowledge and acquiescence, he was secretly moved to Zomba, and from there to Salisbury (in Southern Rhodesia), London, New York and finally California. Banda announced that Chipembere had run away to the US in a nationwide radio broadcast on 21 May.

Chipembere later claimed that an amnesty had been promised for his followers. However, the British and US officials involved recorded that the agreement made related solely to Chipembere's evacuation, although Chipembere was not made aware of Banda's refusal of a full amnesty. Many of his followers were detained without trial after his departure and a few continued raids on government targets for some time, leading to retaliatory burning of local villages and the hanging of one of the leaders, Medson Silombela, in January 1966 before an invited audience, rather than in public as Banda originally proposed, as Glyn Jones declined to sign the bill authorising this.

== Exile ==
Chipembere spent the rest of his life in exile. He remained in California until August 1966 when he considered the possibilities of remaining in the United States, moving to Britain or to Zambia or Tanzania. Because of his diabetes, Chipembere wanted to live in a country with better medical facilities than Tanzania or Zambia. However, the British government, wary of offending Banda, was allegedly not receptive of his proposal to live there, and Zambia would only accept him if he lived in a rural area, so this left Tanzania as the most welcoming option, then ruled by Julius Nyerere and his African-Socialist Tanganyika African National Union (TANU) party. After his move to Dar es Salaam, Chipembere taught at Kivukoni College and set up a new political party, the Panafrican Democratic Party of Malawi. In early 1968, he attempted reconciliation with Banda through Lady Listowel and, through her, Glyn Smallwood Jones.

"I am finished and useless", he told Listowel. "I can accomplish nothing, am unemployed, receiving a small pittance from the Tanzanian government... I do not wish to crawl back to Dr Banda but I am desperate". (From a letter by Glyn Jones). Although Banda reportedly expressed interest in allowing Chipembere back in exchange for his thorough recantation and support, this never came to anything.

In 1969, Chipembere returned to the US, where he taught at California State University. He died in Los Angeles on 24 September 1975 of diabetes and a liver disease, aged 45, survived by his wife, Catherine, and seven children.

In the early 1990s, after Banda had been ousted, Catherine Chipembere returned to Malawi and was the first woman elected to Parliament. She also served in the Ministry of Culture and Education before retiring to Mangochi, where she works with AIDS orphans and a women's knitting cooperative.

Their son Masauko Chipembere Jr is an internationally known jazz artist.

== Sources ==
- Colin Baker, (2000). Sir Glyn Jones, A Proconsul in Africa, I.B. Tauris, London.
- Colin Baker, (2001). Revolt of the Ministers: The Malawi Cabinet Crisis 1964-1965, I. B. Tauris. ISBN 978-1-86064-642-3.
- Colin Baker, (2006). Chipembere: The Missing Years, Kachere, Zomba, 2006. ISBN 978-99908-76-33-8.
- Patrick Devlin et al., (1959) Report of the Nyasaland Commission of Inquiry, Cmnd. 814, Her Majesty's Stationery Office, London, July 1959.
- Owen. J. M. Kalinga, (2012). Historical Dictionary of Malawi, 4th edition. Lanham, Scarecrow Press. ISBN 978-0-8108-5961-6
- John McCracken, (2002). The Ambiguities of Nationalism: Flax Musopole and the Northern Factor in Malawian Politics, c. 1956–1966, Journal of Southern African Studies, Vol. 28, No. 1.
- John McCracken, (2012). A History of Malawi, 1859–1966, Woodbridge, James Currey. ISBN 978-1-84701-050-6.
- Joey Power, (2010). Political Culture and Nationalism in Malawi: Building Kwacha. University of Rochester Press. ISBN 978-1-58046-310-2.
- Robert I. Rotberg, (1965). The Rise of Nationalism in Central Africa, Harvard University Press, Cambridge, Massachusetts.
- Robert I. Rotberg, (2002) Hero of the Nation: Chipembere of Malawi, an Autobiography. Blantyre, Christian Literature Association of Malawi. ISBN 99908-16-25-0
- Robert I. Rotberg, (2010) Masauko Chipembere: Brief life of a pioneering African nationalist: 1930-1975, Harvard Review, May/June 2010, 99 42–3.
- Philip Short, (1974) Banda, Routledge & Kegan Paul, London and Boston.
