= Lawrence Makata =

Laurence (aka Lawrence) Makata, (1916–1962), was a businessman influential in the Nyasaland independence movement in the 1950s and 1960s.

== Early life ==
Makata was born in 1916 in Ndirande near Blantyre, Nyasaland (now Malawi) into an influential Yao family. Eschewing a mission education, which would have been the normal step to a position of relative influence for one of his background, he left school early to work in Hall's Garage as a driver and mechanic. Lorries (or "trucks" in American parlance) were then just beginning to supplant human porters as the main means of moving freight in Nyasaland. During the Second World War he drove lorries carrying goods (some of them illicit) between Blantyre and Salisbury, the capital of Southern Rhodesia (now Zimbabwe). After the war, together with another Yao lorry driver, Lali Lubani, he founded the Nyasaland African Drivers Association. He recruited drivers and mechanics from Conforzi's Tea and Tobacco company in Cholo (or Thyolo) where they had recently participated in a strike, as well as from Tobacco Auctions, local garages and from the recently formed national bus service, Nyasaland Transport Company. There was an entry fee of five shillings and annual dues of 12 shillings, a rate high enough to discourage unskilled applicants. Makata and Lubani affiliated this organization with the politically active Nyasaland African Congress (fore-runner of the Malawi Congress Party which became the only legal political party after Malawi became a republic in 1966). At the NAC's fourth annual meeting in September 1947, Lubani called on the government to introduce a minimum wage for lorry drivers. In 1948, they changed the name to the Nyasaland African Workers Association and in 1949 registered it as the country's first official trade union. By 1957, the Association had a membership of 255.

== Business Success ==
In 1948, while still secretary of the Association, Makata bought a lorry which he used to transport and sell firewood in Blantyre. Within a short time, he had grown this into a general trucking business with five lorries. In 1951, along with Lali Lubani and Hartwell Solomon, another African entrepreneur, he contributed free labour, transport and bricks to Mikeka Mkandawire who was constructing buildings without permits in Chichiri in protest against a town plan which seemed designed to clear the area, designated as African Trust Land, of low-income (i.e. African) residents. By 1952, Makata's businesses had expanded to include maize machines, a brick-making operation, a timber business and a bus and taxi service. Later, Makata & Sons Ltd. added five milling machines, a garage and a bar in Lilongwe. In 1953, with businesses now worth thousands of pounds, he created an African Chamber of Commerce along with other African entrepreneurs.

== Political Influence ==
During this time, Makata also developed ties of patronage with Blantyre's urban poor by providing credit and making his lorries available for funerals. He sponsored a primary school in Ndirande and provided a bus service to areas where the European-operated service was absent. He took responsibility for the housing, health and general welfare of his employees, both kin and non-kin. He revived the moribund Ndirande Welfare Club, which became a focal point for African political activity. In August 1958, along with Lubani, he became a member of the Executive Committee of the Nyasaland African Congress. According to John McCracken (Blantyre Transformed):

"Lali Lubani and Lawrence Makata have been almost entirely ignored in accounts of Malawian nationalism. Yet they and other businessmen played an active and influential role in the movement, not just as members of Banda's Executive Committee from August 1958, but even more as Congress's principal financial backers and as urban power-brokers, linking the party to the urban poor and providing cars and lorries to transport members to meetings."

For example, in January 1959, Makata and Lubani provided lorries to transport attendants to and from the so-called secret meeting at which an alleged "massacre plot" against Europeans had been discussed.

On March 3, 1959, he was detained and interned in Kanjedza Camp, along with hundreds of others, in a massive nationwide swoop which became known as Operation Sunrise. His businesses suffered severely during the ten months of his detention. He was released, along with Hastings Banda and many others, in April 1960.

Banda arrogated to himself the power to appoint all Malawi Congress Party (MCP – successor organization to the Nyasaland African Congress) candidates running in the parliamentary elections to be held in August 1961. He did not appoint Makata or Lubani, allegedly because he regarded them as having too little education. (According to one story, Banda, who was always immaculately dressed, took exception to Makata wearing a torn shirt and wrote him a check suggesting he go and buy a new one—see Power, Building Kwacha, p. 290). This was in contrast to several "Northerners", young, educated men, who were prominent in the MCP. By October 1961, after the new government led by Banda had been sworn in, Makata along with Lubani, Sydney Somanje and Willie Chokani are said to have founded a rival, southern-based bloc.

== Death ==
Makata died in April 1962 at the Mchinji turn-off in Lilongwe when his car crashed after he and two friends had been celebrating at Kwacha Cultural Centre in Blantyre where they had reportedly been drinking heavily.
