= John Msonthi =

Malawian politician

John Dustan Msonthi was a Malawian politician. He served as a Cabinet Minister and translator during the government of Kamuzu Banda.

== Life ==
Msonthi was a Roman Catholic son of an Anglican clergyman, Reverend Canon Msonthi. He went to Zomba Catholic Secondary School and he was one of the first two students to gain a Catholic Overseas Certificate. He was able to attend St. Xavier's College, Kolkata in India with the support of the Catholic Church. However when he returned the church could not cope with an African graduate and at one point special housing had to be built to avoid "a crisis".

He left the church because he did not see the Anglican church as consistent with his politics. His brother, Boniface Msonthi, was an activist in the National African Congress, and a government Minister in the 1960s and 1970s.

Children: Jane Msonthi (Jane Banda) Lt. General John Dunstan Msonthi Mary Msonthi (Mary Maulana) Ulemu Msonthi Mundilanje Msonthi Dziko Msonthi Francis Xavier Msonthi

== Political life ==
=== Translator ===
He worked for Kamuzu Banda, the Minister of Transport and Communication. Banda could not speak Chichewa and needed a translator. Kamuzu's message was relayed by his interpreter, John Msonthi. From 1958 until the 1970s he deciphered English into Chichewa using expressions, proverbs and metaphors that mesmerized Malawians. These messages were vital in the Malawian fight for Independence. Msonthi was later replaced by John Tembo.

=== Minister ===
During the cabinet crisis of 1964, Msonthi, along with Yatuta Chisiza and Willie Chokani, resigned from Banda's cabinet to protest his dismissal of Kanyama Chiume, Orton Chirwa, and Augustine Bwanausi. Msonthi withdrew his resignation a few hours later. Banda reinstated Msonthi as Minister of Transport and Communication.

While he was Minister, a bill was passed that established the powers of the Censorship Board. It allowed the board to dispose of undesirable publications without challenge. It was claimed that its passage would allow Malawi standards and interests of morality, decency and public order to prevail in entertainment and publications. It was opposed by Michael Blackwood, a spokesman for European settler interests. Msonthi noted that, "It is our duty, as a government, to make sure that people who take any films in this country for show or their private use, do so in accordance with the decency and morality of this country. We must make sure that what they photograph is the right thing." The bill was passed with three readings and within three days. The Censorship Board was run by Tobias Banda.

== Death ==
Msonthi was later killed.
