= Zomba Catholic Secondary School =

Coordinates: 15.4114539°S 35.2226041°E

Location
- Zomba; Malawi

Information
- Other name: BOX 2
- Religious affiliation(s): Catholic Church
- Established: 1942

Zomba Catholic Secondary School (ZCSS) and popularly known as "Box 2" or BOCCO (Boys Of Courage and Cooperation) is one of the oldest secondary schools in Malawi. It is a boy only school and it is located around 5 kilometres (3 miles) from the old capital city's town centre. The school was founded by the Catholic Church, and a community of Marist Brothers is located on site and the brothers help with the teaching and management. The school has around 600 students and 36 teachers as well as several administrative staff.

== History ==
Zomba Catholic Secondary School (ZCSS) was established in 1942 by the Catholic Church. The school was established with the aim of providing quality education rooted in Catholic values to the youth of Malawi. John Msonthi was one of the first two students to gain a Catholic Overseas Certificate in 1948. He returned as an African graduate after attending St. Xavier's College, Kolkata in India with the support of the Catholic Church, but becoming a teacher was difficult.

In 1954, the Montfort Fathers, who initially managed the school, invited the Marist Brothers to take over its administration. This transition marked a significant shift in the school's management and educational approach.

The 1954 administrative shift to the Marist Brothers introduced a new educational philosophy and its holistic management approach. The school's curriculum evolved to emphasize academic excellence and moral development. A policy requiring students to maintain a pass rate of 50% or above was instituted to uphold high educational standards. Students failing to meet this criterion face withdrawal or repetition, ensuring the maintenance of a 100% pass rate. ZCSS has expanded its facilities to accommodate approximately 600 students and 36 teachers. The campus includes boarding facilities, classrooms, and offices.

The 1975 and 1978 Annual conventions of the Malawi Congress Party were held at the school.

In 2017 it was reported that the school was "closing indefinitely" following what was called "shameful" behaviour by the students. Later reports made it clear that the protests were due to the poor management of the school. One of the masters was said to be demanding a bribe from boarders who broke the rules. Earlier reports had said that student were protesting because a boy had been expelled for being drunk. Later reports said that the protest was because the drunk students had been told that they needed to pay money to avoid being suspended. In 2022, ZCSS transitioned to a fully private institution under the complete control of the Catholic Church. This change led to the implementation of entrance examinations as the sole criterion for student admission.

== Notable alumni ==
Zomba Catholic Secondary School (ZCSS)'s students have made significant contributions. Notable alumni include:

- John Msonthi, Government minister
- Steve Chimombo – Malawian writer (1945–2015)
- Thom Mpinganjira
