= Blantyre Secondary School =

Coordinates: 15.7861°S 35.0269°E

Location
- Blantyre; Malawi

Information
- Other name: BSS
- Established: 1941

Blantyre Secondary School is the oldest secondary school in Malawi. It was established by the British colonial government in around 1940. It was initially a boarding school for boys but girls were later admitted and girls dormitories were built. Its alumni has included several notable politicians and the first woman doctor. Secondary education in Malawi is only a possibility and until 2026 it was not free.

== History ==
The Federated Missions are credited with establishing the school. The missions had proposed to the government that they would build it if the government would maintain it. Individual governors were appointed by a particular mission. The school's first students began in September 1940, even though the official opening did not happen until 1941. The official opening was by the governor, Sir Donald Mackenzie-Kennedy, in April 1941. The appointed head was a lay missionary named Geoffrey Tozer Pike. Pike's staff regarded him as racist.

In 1947 the school was expanded from a junior secondary school to a senior secondary school.

In 1959 there was a student strike at the school. In 1960 the headteacher was awarded an OBE in the New Years Honours list.

It has been assumed that the government established the first secondary school in Blantyre but it is said to be on land owned by the Blantyre Synod. The synod believe that the land was obtained under a 99 year lease although this is disputed.

The school's early intakes were all boys and the school only had dormitories for 60 boys. The first two girls joined the 50 boys in the school in 1947 despite some resistance. The two had to board at the primary school and this experiment was reduced when one of the girls failed her Junior Certificate. By 1951 there was 7 girls but the school had not built a dormitory as it required 12 to justify the expense.

In 1964 the boarding girls were moved to another dormitory as it offered security for the girls from intruders and it prevented them from unauthorised excursions. A new block for boarding girls was built by 1965 after the government made £2,000 available. The girls received lessons in domestic science and by 1967 an addition pert-time teacher was required.

In 2019 there was reportedly riots in the school that required tear gas. The students protested because students were being admitted to the school by unusual routes. The new arrivals were allegedly paying to be admitted to a boarding school that was already overcrowded. The students marched to the anti-corruption offices in protest and the authorities said that they would close the school.

In 2026 the Blantyre Synod's Anderson Juma told his congregation that he believed that the school's land belongs to the synod. It had been leased but the synod did not intend to extend the lease and the school's buildings would in time belong to the synod. This account was questioned by others.

== Alumni ==
- Augustine Bwanausi was educated and worked here as a teacher before he became a government minister.
- Chakakala Chaziya politician
- Catherine Chipembere politician
- Henry Masauko Blasius Chipembere politician
- Willie Chokani was a politician and the first head of the Henry Henderson Institute.
- Ceciwa Khonje (born Bwanausi) was involved in the creation of Malawi and she became Malawi's first woman broadcaster.
- Grace Malenga studied here before going on to become one of Malawi's first woman doctors working in the country.
- Brown Mpinganjira was educated here and he went on to be a member of parliament for Mulange.
- Joy Nathu is a Malawian radio DJ, producer, broadcaster and presenter
- The politician Dindi Gowa Nyasulu was educated here.
- D. D. Phiri was a Malawian author, economist, historian, and playwright
- John Tembo was a leading politician.

== Notable staff ==
- Shadrack Khonje ⋅ Biology teacher and co-founder of Malawi Congress Party
- Geoffrey Tozer Pike OBE - headteacher
