= Nyasaland Constitutional Party =

Political party in Malawi

The Nyasaland Constitutional Party (NCP) was a political party in Malawi.

== History ==
The party was established in April 1963 as a continuation of the Nyasaland branch of the United Federal Party. It was led by Michael Hill Blackwood, who had previously led the UFP in Nyasaland.

In the 1964 general elections the NCP won all three "special roll" seats reserved for Europeans (for which there were only 814 registered voters) unopposed.

In 1966 Malawi became a one-party state with the Malawi Congress Party as the sole legal party.
