= 1964 Nyasaland general election =

← 1961	28 April 1964	1971 →

All 53 seats in the Legislative Council 27 seats needed for a majority
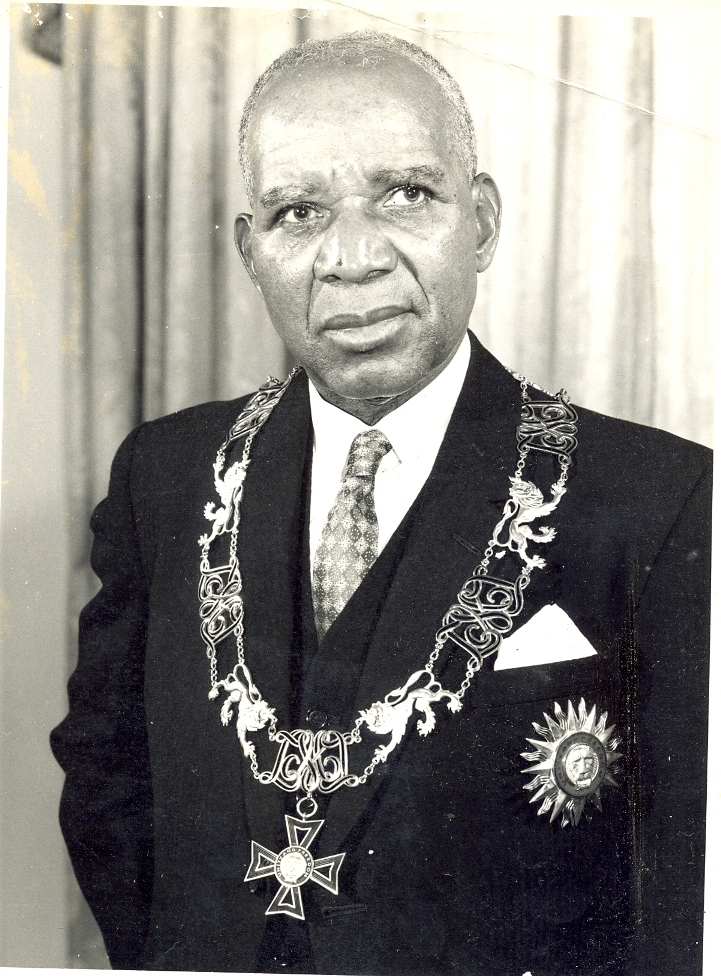
	First party	Second party
Leader	Hastings Banda	Michael Hill Blackwood
Party	MCP	NCP
Last election	22 seats	5 seats
Seats won	50	3
Seat change	▲28	▼2
Prime Minister before election
Hastings Banda
MCP
Elected Prime Minister
Hastings Banda
MCP

General elections were due to be held for the Legislative Council in Nyasaland on 28 April 1964, and would have been the first in the country under universal suffrage. However, there were no opposition candidates to either the Malawi Congress Party in the general roll seats (the Nyasaland Asian Convention had dissolved itself and declared its support for the MCP), or the Nyasaland Constitutional Party in the special roll seats, resulting in all 53 candidates winning without votes being cast.

MCP leader Hastings Banda remained Prime Minister, leading the country to independence as Malawi on 6 July. Banda spent the next few years consolidating his power. By 1966 the MCP was the only legally permitted party and by 1971 Banda had made himself president for life. The MCP would remain the only legal party until 1993, eventually losing power in the first multiparty post-independence elections in 1994.

== Background ==
The elections were announced on Radio Malawi on 17 November 1963. The constituency borders were finalised on 11 March. Candidates were nominated on 6 April.

== Electoral system ==
There were two voter rolls; the initial plan was for Africans and mixed-race people identifying as African to be on a general roll and for non-Africans and mixed-race people not identifying as African to be on a special roll. All people over the age of 21 who had been in Nyasaland for at least two years were given the vote, except Africans who were not from Nyasland or one of the neighbouring countries (Northern Rhodesia, Portuguese East Africa or Tanganyika). The general roll was to elect 50 members and the special roll five. The special roll created some controversy; the Nyasaland Constitutional Party opposed the inclusion of Asians on the special roll, as they would outnumber the Europeans. In late December the debate shifted to whether the special roll seats should exist at all. Ultimately the decision was made to have a general roll for Africans, Asians and mixed-race people, and a special roll for Europeans.

However, as no census had been taken since 1946, there were no reliable estimates of population and the figure had to be extrapolated from the number of taxpayers, with the number of taxpayers (which was limited to men over the age of 25) was doubled and another 25% added to account for tax evaders; the total figure arrived at was roughly 1.5 million. Voter registration took place between 30 December and 19 January 1963, in which 1,871,170 people registered for the general roll and 814 for the special roll. With so few people registering for the special role, Minister for Transport and Communications Colin Cameron campaigned for the abolition of the special roll, writing to every European resident in the country. The final decision of the Secretary of State was to reduce the number of special roll seats to three. Another brief period of registration was allowed between 24 and 29 February for Europeans who had missed out on registering for the special roll. However, the 620 people that registered in this period were added to the general roll. This gave a total of 1,871,790 people registered on the general roll.

== Campaign ==
During a mass meeting on an airfield between Cholo and Mlanje on 15 March, Banda announced that he had chosen 50 candidates to represent the party in the elections, of which 49 were men and one a woman, and that the party would not contest the special roll seats. The Nyasaland Constitutional Party candidates were announced a few days later. Following Banda's announcement, the MCP worked to ensure it would face no opposition in the elections, and in late March, the only party opposed to the MCP, Mbadwa, announced that it would not run.

== Results ==
Party	Seats			
Party	General	Special	Total	+/–
Malawi Congress Party	50	–	50	+28
Nyasaland Constitutional Party	–	3	3	–2
Total	50	3	53	+25
Source: Rowland
