= Dunduzu Chisiza =

Rhodesian politician (1930–1962)

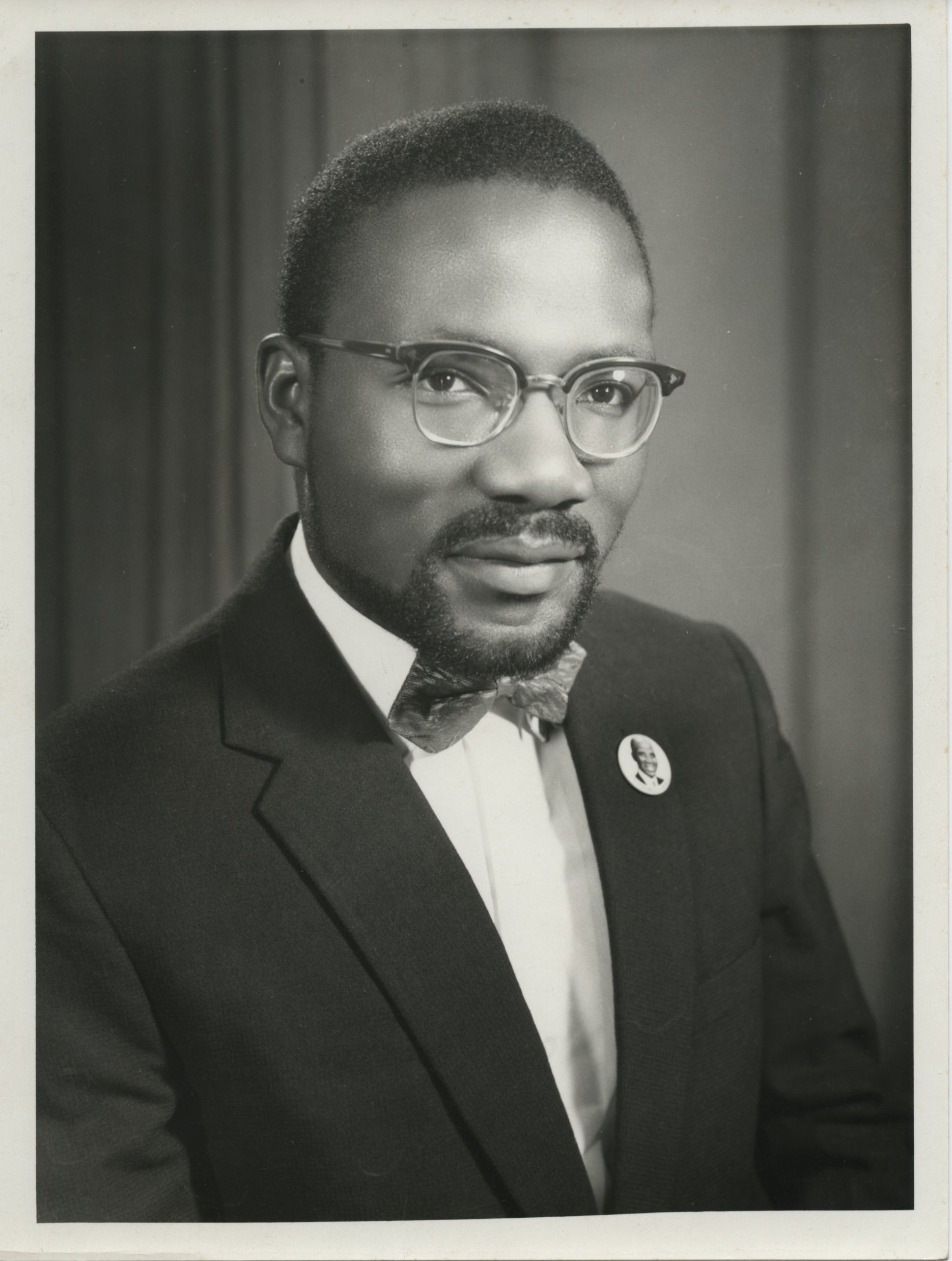
- DK Chisiza portrait taken in the 1960s

Parliamentary Secretary to the Ministry of Finance of Malawi
- In office August 1961 – 2 September 1962
- Minister: Henry Phillips
- Succeeded by: John Tembo

Secretary-General of the Malawi Congress Party
- In office September 1960 – 2 September 1962

Personal details
- Born: 8 August 1930 Karonga District, Nyasaland
- Died: 2 September 1962 (aged 32) Thondwe, Nyasaland
- Party: Nyasaland African Congress (until 1959); Malawi Congress Party (from 1960)
- Relations: Yatuta Chisiza (brother)
- Children: 3, Chiliro Chisiza, Makata Nthutwe Chisiza and Dunduzu Chisiza Jr.
- Education: Fircroft College

Dunduzu Kaluli Chisiza (8 August 1930 – 2 September 1962), also known as Gladstone Chisiza, was an African nationalist who was active in the independence movements in Rhodesia and Nyasaland, respectively present-day Zimbabwe and Malawi.

== Early life and education ==
Chisiza was born on 8 August 1930 in Florence Bay (now Chiweta or Chitimba) in the Karonga District of Nyasaland (now Malawi). He was the youngest and eleventh child of Kaluli Chisiza, a village headman and farmer. He, like his older brother Yatuta, was educated at Uliwa Junior Primary School and later, as a boarder at the Livingstonia Mission. He left school in 1949 after failing his Standard VI examination.

Chisiza went north to Tanganyika (now Tanzania), where in 1949 he briefly worked as a clerk in the police records department in Dar es Salaam. He studied for four years at Aggrey Memorial College in Uganda, earning a Cambridge International General Certificate of Education. There, he joined and became secretary of the Nyasaland Students' Association active at Makerere College in Kampala, and supported himself by working odd jobs. During this time, he joined the Baháʼí Faith, but later left after learning the religion was opposed to political involvement. He described it as "a religion for free people whose countries are free from foreign domination. In 1952 and 1953, he was a member of an American-led team that did a study tour of the Belgian Congo (today the Democratic Republic of the Congo).

== Activities in Rhodesia ==
Chisiza briefly returned to Nyasaland, before going to Southern Rhodesia in 1953, where he worked as a clerk interpreter and translator for the Indian High Commission in Salisbury (now Harare). One of his responsibilities there was the publication of a regular information bulletin. In Salisbury, Chisiza lived in the Matapi Hostel, and joined the Mashonaland branch of the Nyasaland African Congress. He became involved with Rhodesian anticolonial activists like James Chikerema and George Nyandoro, and in 1955, he was one of the founders of Southern Rhodesia African National Congress Youth League. Along with Nyandoro and Edson Sithole, he formed the City Youth League (CYL), whose first major accomplishment was the 1956 Salisbury bus boycott. He was deported from Southern Rhodesia in September 1956 to Nyasaland.

== Activities in Nyasaland ==
In Nyasaland, he began working at a family butcher and continued his political activities, including in opposition to the Federation of Rhodesia and Nyasaland. In 1957, he participated on behalf of the Nyasaland African Congress in constitutional discussions with the colonial administration. In 1957 and 1958, he lived in Birmingham, England and attended Fircroft College, where he studied economics, sociology, and political science, with a focus on the economics of developing countries. While in England, he began correspondence with Hastings Banda, later the first President of Malawi. He was, it is thought, first commended to Banda in a letter (dated 6 July 1957) from Henry Chipembere, who described him as a young man he would like for his 'extreme views' and as 'a self-made intellectual of no university attainments who surprised all with his mental powers'. He met Banda in person in London in June of that year, when, together with Chipembere and Chief Kutanja, they met with the Colonial Secretary, Lennox-Boyd, to discuss a new constitution for Nyasaland (one which had already been roundly rejected by Nyasaland's governor, Robert Armitage). Lennox-Boyd 'took note' of their views but said he didn't think the Congress represented Nyasa African opinion.

In August 1958, at Banda's request, Chisiza returned to Nyasaland and, at a meeting of the Congress in Nkhata Bay on 1 August, was nominated as Secretary General of the Malawi Congress Party. He, together with his brother, Yatuta, Kanyama Chiume and Henry Chipembere, worked tirelessly to promote Banda's image as saviour of the native peoples of Nyasaland. He was a key organiser of Nyasaland African Congress and part of the inner circle that met on 24–25 January 1959 to discuss a change of approach from non-violence to violence where necessary. Chisiza was arrested, along with other high-profile African dissidents, in the dawn raids of Operation Sunrise on 3 March 1959, when the colonial administration, responding to incidents of rioting in various areas of the country, declared a state of emergency in Nyasaland. He was imprisoned in Gwelo, Southern Rhodesia, in the European wing of the jail together with Banda, Chipembere and his brother Yatuta (and separately from many other Africans jailed after Operation Sunrise). He was released, some months after Banda, in September 1960 and in December participated in constitutional talks also involving Banda and Orton Chirwa in London. These were the Lancaster House Constitutional Conference, and the Federal Review Conference, the latter which was to review the Federation of Rhodesia and Nyasaland. Early in 1961, he visited India where he took part in demonstrations at the American and Belgian embassies protesting the CIA-assisted murder of Patrice Lumumba, the first Prime Minister of the Congo. His pamphlet "Africa – What Lies Ahead" was published by the Indian Council for Africa. In August 1961, Chisiza was elected to represent Karonga in the Legislative Council and became Parliamentary Secretary to the Minister of Finance, Henry Phillips (later Sir Henry Phillips).

It appears that during this early period in the run-up to independence, Chisiza and Banda had severe and sometimes heated disagreements over policy. In April 1962, together with his now-mentor Henry Phillips, he visited London for discussions regarding Nyasaland finances. His favourable attitude toward a possible loan for a hydroelectric project to be made through the Federation of Rhodesia and Nyasaland (opposition to which was the proximate cause, many would say, for the independence movement in Nyasaland) reportedly caused Banda to become extremely annoyed. The rift was such that, according to some reports, Chisiza resigned or threatened to resign. Some sources allege that he seriously contemplated forming an opposition party, possibly along with Henry Chipembere, once independence had been achieved.

== Economic development ==
In July 1962 he hosted an economic development symposium, sponsored by the Ford Foundation, at which authorities from around the world presented papers on African and Malawian development. He himself gave a presentation warning of the dangers of dictatorship in emerging African countries. (Among his publications was the aforementioned paper entitled "Africa – What Lies Ahead?", published by the African-American Institute, New York, in 1962). The conference was an unqualified success. In the short time of his prominence, Chisiza gained enormous respect in the west for his intellect, energy and pioneering ideas.

== Death ==
Chisiza died on 3 September 1962, while driving back to Zomba from Blantyre. His cream-coloured Mercedes was found in a small stream bed beside a bridge at Thondwe, on the road to Zomba. An inquest concluded he had died from a fracture at the base of his skull. He left a wife and three sons. One, Dunduzu Chisiza Jr., was born subsequent to his death and became one of Malawi's most prominent playwrights.
