= 1961 Nyasaland general election =

General elections were held for the Legislative Council in Nyasaland in August 1961. The result was a victory for the Malawi Congress Party, which won all 20 lower roll seats (in five of which they were unopposed) and two of the eight higher roll seats.

== Electoral system ==
There were two voter rolls, a lower roll with a predominantly African electorate, which elected 20 members, and had 106,095 registered voters, and a higher roll of largely European and Asian electors, which elected eight members, with 4,337 registered voters. As five constituencies in the lower roll were uncontested, only 75,707 voters were eligible on election day. All members were elected from single-member constituencies, which largely followed the same boundaries as the country's districts.

District	Lower roll electorate	Lower roll constituency	Higher roll electorate	Higher roll constituency
Karonga	5,266	Karonga	32	Northern Province
Mzimba	13,802	Mzimba North; Mzimba South	198	Northern Province
Nkata Bay	5,643	Nkata Bay	30	Northern Province
Rumpi	3,597	Rumpi	28	Northern Province
Dedza	5,741	Dedza	82	Central Districts
Dowa	6,467	Dowa	82	Central Districts
Fort Manning	4,087	Kasungu Fort Manning	23	Central Districts
Kasungu	4,012	Kasungu Fort Manning	25	Central Districts
Kota Kota	4,285	Kota Kota	25	Central Districts
Ncheu	4,368	Ncheu	43	Central Districts
Lilongwe	9,649	Lilongwe North; Lilongwe South	485	Central Districts; Lilongwe Town
Blantyre	4,065	Blantyre Urban	2,036	Blantyre; Soche; Limbe
Blantyre	8,072	Blantre Rural; Chiradzulu	82	Blantyre; Soche; Limbe
Chikwawa	2,638	Lower River	28	Southern Districts
Port Herald	1,949	Lower River	47	Southern Districts
Cholo	4,754	Cholo	295	Southern Districts
Mlanje	7,654	Mlanje	191	Southern Districts
Fort Johnston	2,253	Fort Johnston Kasupe	48	Shire North
Kasupe	2,150	Fort Johnston Kasupe	22	Shire North
Zomba	5,643	Zomba	522	Shire North
Total	106,095		4,337	
Source: Constituencies Commission

== Results ==
Party	Lower Roll			Upper Roll			Total seats
Party	Votes	%	Seats	Votes	%	Seats	Total seats
Malawi Congress Party	71,659	98.79	20	385	10.34	2	22
United Federal Party	607	0.84	0	2,108	56.59	5	5
Christian Liberation Party	272	0.37	0				0
Independents				1,232	33.07	1	1
Total	72,538	100.00	20	3,725	100.00	8	28
Registered voters/turnout	75,707	–		4,337	–		
Source: Nohlen et al.

== Aftermath ==
Before the elections, the Colonial Office had assumed that the Malawi Congress Party would be entitled to three Executive Council seats through winning a majority of the lower roll seats. As the Lancaster House agreement provided that two Executive Council seats would go to ministers elected from the higher roll, it was thought that the mainly white United Federal Party would gain both these seats. In the event, the United Federal Party only won five seats, two going to Congress and one to a Congress-inclined independent, Colin Cameron. The Governor offered the United Federal Party a single Executive Council seat, which it refused. This left all five elected Executive Council seats available for Congress candidates.

== Sources ==
- The National Archives (United Kingdom): File DO 158/36: "Malawi Congress Party"
- The National Archives (United Kingdom): File CO 1015/2444: "Malawi Congress party"
- Lucy Mair, The Nyasaland Elections of 1961 (London: Athlone Press, 1962)
