= Augustine Bwanausi =

Malawian politician

Augustine Bwanausi was born in Malawi, then called Nyasaland, in 1930 and trained as a science teacher, but was also politically active in the Nyasaland African Congress, campaigning for the end of colonial rule. In March 1959, a State of Emergency was declared, and Bwanausi was arrested as a leading Congress member and detained until 1960. On his release, he joined the Malawi Congress Party and in 1961 was elected to the Legislative Council, becoming Minister of Internal Affairs and Development in the same year. In 1963, he became Minister of Works. In 1964, there was a confrontation between Banda and most of his ministers, which led to the sacking of Bwanausi and two of his cabinet colleagues in September 1964. Three other cabinet ministers resigned in sympathy, and although Banda was willing to re-instate Bwanausi and one or two other ministers, their insistence on all be reinstated ended any hope of a reconciliation. In October 1964, Bwanausi left Malawi for Zambia, where he resumed teaching, and was active in Malawian exile politics until his death in a car accident in 1968.

== Before Independence ==
Bwanausi was born in Blantyre in Malawi, then called Nyasaland, in 1930. His parents were James and Nettie (born Somanje) Bwanausi. His younger sister became the broadcaster Ceciwa Khonje. He was educated at Blantyre Secondary School, where he was an outstanding student. He attended Makerere College, now Makerere University in Uganda and received a BSc degree there. He returned to Nyasaland with the intention of teaching, and in 1955 he completed a diploma in education and started to teach mathematics and science at Blantyre Secondary School. From the time of his return, he became politically active in the Nyasaland African Congress, campaigning for the end of colonial rule. Bwanausi was arrested as a leading Congress member in the State of Emergency declared in March 1959, and detained until 1960.

In March 1959, when Sir Robert Armitage, the Governor declared a State of Emergency, Bwanausi was arrested as a leading Congress member and detained without trial until 1960. The Nyasaland African Congress was also banned in March 1959, but it was replaced by the Malawi Congress Party (MCP) formed in September 1959 on behalf of the imprisoned Banda. On his release, he returned to teaching, but joined the Malawi Congress Party and in 1961 was elected to the Legislative Council, becoming Minister of Internal Affairs and Development in the same year. In 1963, he became Minister of Works.

== The Cabinet Crisis ==
From mid-1963, Banda began to criticise his ministers in public, and he began to create a climate of uncertainty by changing ministerial portfolios, some for alleged breaches of party discipline. Banda's failure to consult other ministers, keeping power in his own hands, maintaining diplomatic relations with South Africa and Portugal and a number of domestic austerity measures caused two confrontations in cabinet meetings, which Bwanausi attended. In the first, on 10 August 1964, all the ministers present asked Banda to stop making slighting references to them in speeches and not to hold so many government portfolios himself. In the more serious second confrontation, on 26 August 1964, the ministers present presented Banda with a list of grievances including his failure to Africanise the public service, his relations with Portugal and South Africa and their own ambiguous position.

Banda decided not to agree to the ministers' demands, and on 1 September, he advised the Governor-General of his intention re-form the cabinet replacing a number of them by his close followers. He sacked three cabinet members including Bwanausi on 7 September 1964. Banda apparently thought that the others would remain in office, but on the same day three other cabinet ministers resigned in sympathy, precipitating the Cabinet Crisis of 1964.

== Exile and death ==
Despite attempts by the Governor-General to mediate, and Banda's willingness to re-instate Bwanausi, his colleague, Willie Chokani and possibly one other minister, the ex-ministers' insistence on all of them being reinstated and outbreaks of violence later in September 1964 ended any hope of a reconciliation. At the start of October 1964, Bwanausi and Chokani left voluntarily for Zambia. Over the next few weeks several other ex-ministers fled the country because they feared for their safety.

Bwanausi and Chokani resumed teaching in Zambia, where they, and were active in Malawian exile politics becoming a prominent member of the Pan-African Democratic Party which had been formed by another ex-minister, Henry Chipembere. Bwanausi and two travelling companions were killed in a car accident near Ndola in 1968, when driving to a Pan-African Democratic Party meeting. His brother, Harry Bwanausi, a doctor, joined his brother in exile in Zambia but survived to return to Malawi in 1994.

== Published Sources ==
- C Baker, (2001). Revolt of the Ministers: The Malawi Cabinet Crisis 1964–1965, IB Tauris. ISBN 978-1-86064-642-3.
- C Baker, (2006). Chipembere, the Missing Years, African Books Collective ISBN 978-99908-76-33-8.
- O J M Kalinga, (2012). Historical Dictionary of Malawi, Rowman and Littlefield. ISBN 978-0-8108-5961-6.
- J McCracken, (2012). A History of Malawi, 1859–1966, Woodbridge, James Currey. ISBN 978-1-84701-050-6.
- A C Ross, (2009). Colonialism to Cabinet Crisis: a Political History of Malawi,, African Books Collective. ISBN 978-99908-87-75-4.
