= Glyn Jones (colonial administrator) =

British colonial administrator (1908–1992)

Sir Glyn Jones GCMG MBE
- Portrait by Walter Bird, 1961

Governor-General of Malawi
- In office 1964–1966
- Monarch: Elizabeth II
- Prime Minister: Hastings Banda
- Preceded by: Post created; Himself as governor
- Succeeded by: Post abolished

Governor of Nyasaland
- In office 1961–1964
- Preceded by: Robert Perceval Armitage
- Succeeded by: Post abolished; Himself as governor-general

Personal details
- Born: Glyn Smallwood Jones; 9 January 1908 Chester, England
- Died: 10 June 1992 (aged 84) London, England
- Spouses: Margaret McWilliam (m. 1938, divorced) Nancy Featherstone (m. 1942)
- Children: 2

Sir Glyn Smallwood Jones GCMG MBE (9 January 1908 – 10 June 1992) was a British colonial administrator in Southern Africa. He was the last governor of Nyasaland (now Malawi) from 1961 until it achieved independence in 1964. He served as the only governor-general of Malawi from 1964 until it became a republic in 1966.

== Education ==
Glyn Smallwood Jones was born in Chester, England, on 9 January 1908 and baptised in the Calvinist Methodist Church. He attended a council-run elementary school in Chester and, from 1919 to 1927, The King's School, Chester, where in 1926 he became Head Boy and Captain of School. He was later admitted as a non-collegiate student to St Catherine's Society (later St Catherine's College), Oxford, and played soccer for the university in 1928-1931 as well as being stroke of the St Catherine's 2nd VIII. After graduating in 1930, he was accepted for posting to Northern Rhodesia (now Zambia) as an Administrative Officer Cadet to the Colonial Service conditional upon successfully completing the Tropical Africa Services course at Oxford, which he did in 1931.

== Northern Rhodesia ==
In June 1931, Jones's appointment was confirmed and he sailed for Cape Town on 9 July 1931, on the Edinburgh Castle. He spent his first eight months in Northern Rhodesia under canvas, based in the Zambezi valley. In February 1932, he was posted to Mwinilunga in the northwest of the country, where he was based for the next 2 1/2 years. During this time he sat and passed the Chinyanja exam. After his mandatory leave in 1934, he was posted to Luanshya on the Copperbelt, during a period of disturbances among the native mineworkers there. In 1936-1937 he played on the Northern Rhodesia national soccer team.

On leave again in 1938, he married Margaret McWilliam. However, she refused to go back with him to Northern Rhodesia and he never saw her again. On his return, he was posted to Balovale in the northwest province, and acted as Secretary on the Balovale Commission under MacDonell. Jones was appointed District Commissioner, Balovale, in July 1939. After Britain's declaration of war against Germany, his request for leave to go on active service was rejected. In June 1942 he was granted a decree nisi of divorce from his wife, which was made absolute on 26 October 1942. On 8 November, he married Nancy Featherstone, a nurse working in Northern Rhodesia. He was subsequently posted to Feira in the Eastern Province where his wife bore two children, Elisabeth in 1944 and Timothy in 1946.

In 1951 Jones was appointed Commissioner for Native Development and took up residence in Northern Rhodesia's capital, Lusaka. In 1955, he was made Acting Development Secretary as well as being a provincial nominated member of the Legislative Council and a temporary official member of the Executive Council. He was promoted to Provincial Commissioner on 1 December 1955. In August 1956, after another leave, he took over in Ndola in the Western Province and in February 1957 he became resident commissioner of Barotseland, which was administered as a province of Northern Rhodesia. During this time, he hosted a very successful tour by the Governor of Northern Rhodesia, Sir Arthur Benson, who had been his contemporary at Oxford. Shortly thereafter, in January 1958, Benson appointed him Secretary for Native Affairs in Lusaka and he became a close confidant and lieutenant of the governor. During his time as Secretary, there were disturbances among the Tonga inhabitants of the Gwembe valley, which was to be flooded to accommodate the Kariba Dam.

== Nyasaland ==
After the report of the Devlin Commission into disturbances in neighbouring Nyasaland was published in 1959, the UK Secretary of State for the Colonies, Iain Macleod, nominated Jones to be Chief Secretary in Nyasaland. The nomination was motivated by the Devlin Commission having criticised the incumbent administrative officials in Nyasaland as "unimpressive" and by Jones's reputation as a trouble-shooter based on his career in Northern Rhodesia, particularly for his role in dealing with the Copperbelt disturbances. Jones accepted the nomination somewhat reluctantly. In March 1960, prior to his official appointment, which was due to begin at the end of June, he visited Dr Hastings Kamuzu Banda in gaol in Gwelo (now Gweru), Southern Rhodesia (now Zimbabwe). Banda was a leading figure among Africans on Nyasaland opposed to Federation with the Rhodesias and agitating for independence from Britain. Following Jones' favourable report on this meeting, Banda was released in April 1960.

After Iain Macleod became Colonial Secretary, the Governor, Sir Robert Armitage, was discredited, as Macleod saw him as an obstacle to progress. Armitage was advised to go on leave pending retirement in August 1960 and Jones was appointed Acting Governor in his absence. This was a time of rapid transition for Nyasaland, with the African population excited and the European settler population very concerned about the radical changes taking place in the country. A particularly inflammatory issue was the question of whether and, if so, when to release other leading political prisoners, and Jones and Banda had several meetings in his early days as Acting Governor, some confrontational, before the eventual release of most of these prisoners in September 1960. In October 1960, Jones was told that he would be appointed Governor when Sir Robert Armitage retired, and he was also made Knight Commander of the Order of St Michael and St George (i.e. "knighted") at this time. He took the oath of allegiance as Governor on 10 April 1961. His son, Timothy, died shortly thereafter.

An election was announced for August 1961, and the run up to this event was a tense time during which members of Banda's party, the Malawi Congress Party, were said to have engaged in acts of violent intimidation against political opponents, creating some problems for Jones. Shortly after the election, after some tense negotiations, Jones appointed Banda and three other Africans as Ministers of the new government as well as a European favorable to the Malawi Congress Party, and two African parliamentary secretaries. After a timetable for full self-government and independence was agreed at the Lancaster House constitutional conference in London in 1962, Jones allowed Banda and the Malawi Congress ministers to initiate policies. On 1 February 1963, Banda became Prime Minister, and in July 1964, Nyasaland formally became the independent within the Commonwealth as Malawi. With Banda's agreement, Jones stayed on as Governor General. Less than two months later, the Cabinet Crisis of 1964 erupted after most of Banda's ministers agitated for more power in his markedly autocratic government and various policy changes. Jones tried to effect a compromise in which at least some of the ministers would be reinstated but was rebuffed by both sides. By the end of September, most of the former ministers had fled the country. In June 1966, Jones officially assented to Malawi becoming an independent republic, leading to the termination of his own position as Governor General when the country adopted its new status in July 1966.

== Retirement and death ==
Jones returned to England, where he continued for some years to be involved in various ways in Malawian affairs and those of other African countries. In 1967–74 he was in charge of the newly formed Malawi Buying and Trade Agency. In 1972, he acted for Banda in negotiations with the publisher, Longman, which had issued a biography of Banda of which the latter disapproved. (The first print run of 3,000 copies was eventually withdrawn, and a slightly modified version was published by Routledge shortly thereafter). In 1985, he returned to Malawi to interview Banda for a Granada TV series (End of Empire). He fell ill during a holiday in Turkey in April 1992 and died shortly after returning to England for treatment. His ashes were laid to rest next to the grave of his son, Timothy, in Zomba cemetery in 1993, his wife's ashes following in 1999. A mark of the esteem in which he was held in Malawi is that one of the main streets of the commercial capital, Blantyre, still bears his name.

In 1971–1972, he was a deputy chairman of the Pearce Commission.

Government offices
Preceded by Robert Perceval Armitage	Governor of Nyasaland; 1961–1964	Post abolished Himself as governor-general
New creation Himself as governor	Governor-General of Malawi; 1964–1966	Post abolished
