= Kanyama Chiume =

Malawian politician (1929–2007)

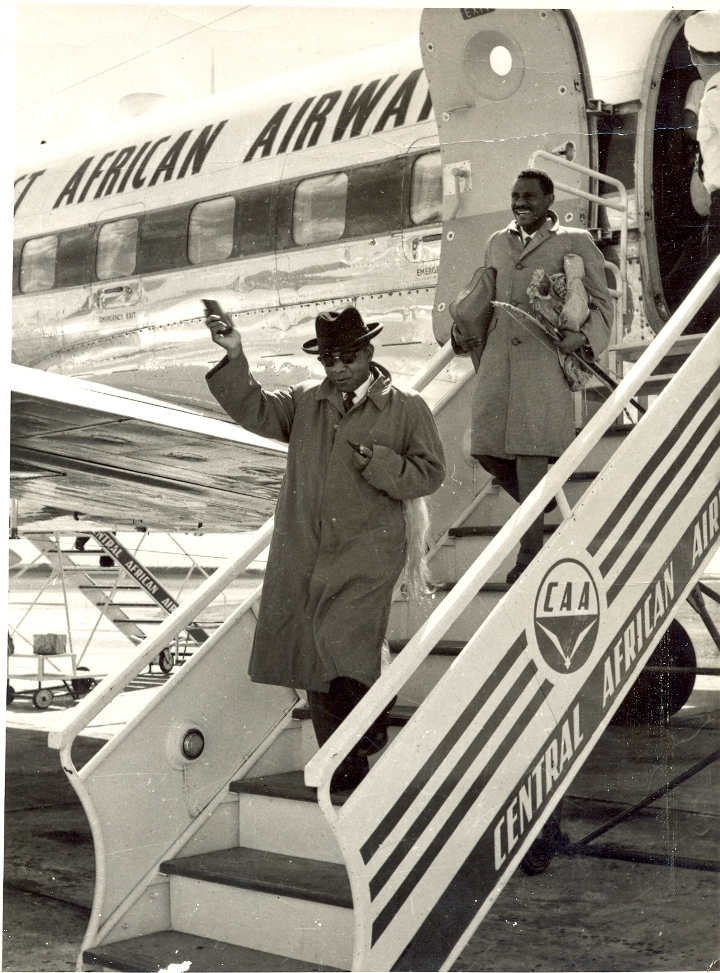
Dr Banda and Kanyama Chiume on an official visit in the early 1960s

Kanyama Chiume (22 November 1929 – 21 November 2007), born Murray William Kanyama Chiume, was a leading nationalist in the struggle for Malawi's independence in the 1950s and 1960s. He was also one of the leaders of the Nyasaland African Congress and served as the Minister of Education and the Minister for Foreign Affairs in the 1960s before fleeing the country after the 1964 Cabinet Crisis.

== Early life and education ==
Chiume was born in Usisya in Nkhata Bay District, Nyasaland, and described his given name, Kanyama, as meaning "another piece of meat for you," a wry joke by parents who had grown wearily accustomed to death in their family. Chiume's younger brother died at two months, and Chiume's own mother died the following day, aged 37. After the funeral, Chiume went with his uncle to his native Tanganyika (now Tanzania). He attended schools in Dar es Salaam in the mid-1940s, at a time when this coastal city was a hotbed of African nationalist political activity. In his last year at Tabora Upper School he became Secretary of the Debating Society, polishing rhetorical skills which would later be much admired when he entered politics in Nyasaland (now Malawi). At Tabora Upper School, he reportedly invited an alumnus, Julius Nyerere, to join him in debating against white colonial teachers and administrators on political subjects.

In 1949, Chiume went to Makerere College in Kampala, Uganda, the premier university in East Africa, and in 1951 he was admitted into Makerere College's Medicine School. He later changed his major to Education, after discovering that he "could not stand human dissection", specializing in Physics, Chemistry and Biology. Among his contemporaries at Makerere were people who would in later life become some of Africa's most accomplished scholars and public officials, including B. Ogot, Kenya's celebrated historian and Chancellor of Moi University in Eldoret, and the second Kenyan president Mwai Kibaki.

He was president of the Makerere College Political Society, while Mwai Kibaki was a committee member. Later he was joined at Makerere by other Nyasas, Vincent Gondwe, David Rubadiri (former Vice Chancellor of the University of Malawi), and Augustine Bwanausi (former Malawi cabinet minister). Chiume was also chairperson of the Makerere College Education Society. Chiume and other students formed a Nyasaland Students Association at Makerere, an association that helped the Nyasaland African Congress by doing research.

After graduating from college Chiume taught at Alliance Secondary School in Dodoma, Tanganyika. He resigned after the white headmaster insinuated that the presence of a pre-adolescent girl in Chiume's house might create immoral temptations. Chiume was extremely offended by the remark, which further gave him resolve to fight for the dignity of Africans. "I had made up my mind there and then to plunge myself into politics and to help remove the obstacles that lay before Africans who wished to have human dignity. I was determined to try and play my part, however small, to free Mother Africa" (from his autobiography). He then went to study law, on a scholarship, at Ramjas College in Delhi, India. Upon being approached by the Nyasaland African Congress to stand in the country's first general election in 1956, Chiume accepted, and decided not to further pursue his interest in law.

== Pan African Politics ==
Chiume actively engaged in towards the end of 1954.

== Malawi Independence ==
In 1955, Nyasaland adopted a new constitution designed to give more representation to Africans, and in the elections which followed Chiume, along with Henry Chipembere, became one of five African representatives in the Legislative Council. He and Chipembere electrified the native population with their vigorous speeches and combative questions in the legislature, which had until then been a somewhat sedate body. As a result, Hansard, the official record of the Council's proceedings, became a bestseller among Nyasa Africans.

Along with Chipembere and the Chisiza brothers (Dunduzu and Yatuta), Chiume became a driving force in organizing popular support in the mid to late 1950s for Hastings Banda and in persuading Banda to return to Nyasaland in order to lead the country to independence. He was given a senior post in the Congress at the Nkhata Bay conference in August 1958 when it adopted Banda as its unquestioned leader.

In March 1959, Chiume avoided arrest while he was in London during "Operation Sunrise" when the local colonial government rounded up and interned members of the Nyasaland African Congress during the state of emergency. In July 1960 he joined Banda, Orton Chirwa, Aleke Banda and other prominent Africans at the Nyasaland Constitutional Conference in London. It was here that British Government decided that Nyasaland (Malawi) should become self-governing by early 1963, and that Banda, should become prime minister. Chiume was made Minister of Education in 1962 and went on to become Foreign Minister in the first government formed after Malawi's official independence in July 1964.

== Tanzania exile ==
Chiume was a key leader in the 1964 Malawi Cabinet Crisis. He was labeled the leader of the crisis and an enemy of Banda after displeasing Banda with a speech in Cairo during a conference for the Organisation of African Unity. He was subsequently driven out of the (now renamed) Malawi Congress Party and exiled to Tanzania from 1964 to 1994.

While in exile, Chiume became active with Tanzania's The Nationalist, Daily News, and Uhuru newspapers. He became an author and publisher of numerous books. He returned to Malawi in 1994 after internal and international pressure on Dr. Banda. After his return Chiume briefly served as Chairman of Malawi National Library Service and the Malawi Book Service. He retired from active politics and eventually moved to New York to live with family before his death on 21 November 2007.

== Death ==
Kanyama Chiume retired from active politics and eventually moved to New York to live with his family until his death on 21 November 2007, the day before his 78th birthday. The remains of the veteran politician arrived back in Lilongwe, Malawi on 29 November 2007.

== See also ==
- Daily News (Tanzania)

== Sources ==
- Report of the Nyasaland Commission of Inquiry, British Colonial Office Cmnd. 814, July 1959.
- Chiume: Autobiography of Kanyama Chiume, Panaf, 1982, by Kanyama Chiume, Panaf, 1982.
- The Rise of Nationalism in Central Africa, by Robert I. Rotberg, Cambridge: Harvard University Press, 1965
- Banda, by Philip Short, London: Routledge & Kegan 1974
- Malawi, the Politics of Despair, by T. David Williams, Cornell University Press, 1978
- Nyerere and Africa: End of an Era, by Godfrey Mwakikagile, Pretoria, South Africa: New Africa Press, 2006
- Kanyama Chiume official website
- "Godfrey Mwakikagile: Eurocentric Africanist?"
- Growing up in a Border District and Resolving the Tanzania-Malawi Lake Dispute: Compromise and concessions, by Godfrey Mwakikagile, African Renaissance Press, 2022
