= Willie Chokani =

- Born: 1930
- Died: 5 May 2015 (aged 84–85)
- Education: University of Delhi
- Known for: headteacher and government minister

Willie Chokani, who was born in Malawi, then called Nyasaland, in 1930, and had a variety of careers; as a teacher, a politician and a diplomat. He has also spent time in prison and was exiled from Malawi for almost 30 years after a confrontation with Hastings Banda, the first Prime Minister of the independent Malawi, in 1964. Chokani received a secondary education, which enabled him to attend university in Delhi and obtain teaching qualifications. He returned to Nyasaland in 1957 to become the first African headmaster in the protectorate, and was also politically active in the Nyasaland African Congress, campaigning for the end of colonial rule. In March 1959, a State of emergency was declared, and Chokani was arrested as a leading Congress member and detained until 1960. On his release, he joined the Malawi Congress Party and in 1961 was elected to the Legislative Council, becoming Minister of Labour in 1962. In 1964, there was a confrontation between Banda and most of his ministers, which led to the sacking of three cabinet members in September 1964. Chokani and two other cabinet ministers resigned in sympathy, and although Banda was willingness to re-instate Chokani and one or two other ministers, their insistence on all be reinstated ended any hope of a reconciliation. Chokani left Malawi for Zambia, where he resumed teaching, and was active in Malawian exile politics. He returned to Malawi in 1993, and in 1994 became Malawi's ambassador to the US, later holding other diplomatic posts until his retirement. .

== Before independence ==
Willie Chokani was born in 1930 in Chiradzulu District and educated at Blantyre Secondary School. He attended the University of Delhi and received BA, MA and BEd degrees there. He returned to Nyasaland in 1957, and founded and became first headmaster of the secondary school of the Henry Henderson Institute, a part of the Blantyre Mission which had previously only offered primary and vocational education. Chokani was the first African headmaster in Nyasaland, and he held this post until he was imprisoned in 1959.

Chokani became politically active in the Nyasaland African Congress, and campaigned actively for decolonisation. In March 1959, when Sir Robert Armitage, the Governor declared a State of emergency, Chokani was arrested as a leading Congress member and detained without trial until 1960. The Nyasaland African Congress was also banned in March 1959, but it was replaced by the Malawi Congress Party (MCP) formed in September 1959 on behalf of the imprisoned Banda. On his release, Chokani became a leading member of MCP, and in August 1961 was elected as a member of the Legislative Council for Chiradzulu.

Chokani was not appointed to ministerial office in August 1961 when Hastings Banda and four other MCP members were given ministerial posts, but he accompanied Banda to London in early 1962 to take part in the Marlborough House talks about future independence. When two additional ministerial posts became available in March 1962, Chokani was made Minister of Labour, a post he retained until September 1964.

== The cabinet crisis ==
From mid-1963, Banda began to criticise his ministers in public, and he began to create a climate of uncertainty by changing ministerial portfolios, some for alleged breaches of party discipline. Banda's failure to consult other ministers, keeping power in his own hands, maintaining diplomatic relations with South Africa and Portugal and a number of domestic austerity measures caused two confrontations in cabinet meetings, which Chokani attended. In the first, on 10 August 1964, all the ministers present asked Banda to stop making slighting references to them in speeches and not to hold so many government portfolios himself. In the more serious second confrontation, on 26 August 1964, the ministers present presented Banda with a list of grievances including his failure to Africanise, his relations with Portugal and South Africa and their own ambiguous position.

Banda decided not to agree to the ministers' demands, and on 1 September, he advised the Governor-General of his intention re-form the cabinet replacing a number of them by his close followers. Three cabinet ministers were dismissed on 7 September: Banda apparently thought that the others would remain in office, but on the same day Chokani and two cabinet colleagues resigned in sympathy (a third one resigned two days later), precipitating the Cabinet Crisis of 1964.

== Leaving Malawi, exile and return ==
The Governor-General attempted to mediate, and Banda's was willing to re-instate Chokani and one or two others, but the ministers' insistence that they should all be reinstated led to a failure of these initiatives. Later in September, clashes broke out between supporters of the ex-ministers and of Banda, and all hope of reconciliation faded. At the start of October 1964, Chokani and his colleague Augustine Bwanausi who had refused to rejoin the cabinet without their colleagues, left voluntarily for Zambia. Over the next few weeks several other ex-ministers fled the country because they feared for their safety.

In Zambia, Chokani became a headmaster again, of Kansenshi Secondary School, a school formerly under the control of the Federation of Rhodesia and Nyasaland, which he desegregated. He was headmaster here from 1969 to 1980. He later taught in the Northern Technical College (NORTECH), Ndola. During his enforced absence from Malawi, Chokani remained politically active and later moved to Tanzania as the treasurer of the Pan-African Democratic Party formed by another ex-minister, Henry Chipembere among Malawian exiles. He returned to Malawi in 1993 and was Malawi's Ambassador to the USA from 1994 to 1999, then Ambassador to Ethiopia and finally High Commissioner to Namibia before his retirement.

Chokani died on May 5, 2015, at Mwaiwathu Private Hospital in Blantyre.

== Published sources ==
- C Baker, (2001). Revolt of the Ministers: The Malawi Cabinet Crisis 1964–1965, IB Tauris. ISBN 978-1-86064-642-3.
- C Baker, (2006). Chipembere, the Missing Years, African Books Collective ISBN 978-99908-76-33-8.
- O J M Kalinga, (2012). Historical Dictionary of Malawi, Rowman and Littlefield. ISBN 978-0-8108-5961-6.
- J McCracken, (2012). A History of Malawi, 1859–1966, Woodbridge, James Currey. ISBN 978-1-84701-050-6.
- A C Ross, (2009). Colonialism to Cabinet Crisis: a Political History of Malawi,, African Books Collective. ISBN 978-99908-87-75-4.
