= Devlin Commission =

The Devlin Commission, officially the Nyasaland Commission of Inquiry, was a Commission of Inquiry set up in 1959 under the chairmanship of Mr Justice Devlin, later Lord Devlin, after African opposition to the Federation of Rhodesia and Nyasaland, particularly its farming and rural conservation policies, and demands for progress towards majority rule promoted by the Nyasaland African Congress under its leader Dr Hastings Banda led to widespread disturbances in Nyasaland and some deaths. A state of emergency was declared in March 1959; about 1,300 people, many of whom were members of the Nyasaland African Congress party, were detained without trial, over were 2,000 imprisoned for offences related to the emergency and the Congress itself was banned. During the State of Emergency and the week preceding it, a total of 51 people were killed by troops or the police. Although the four members of the Commission were members of the British Establishment, its findings were highly unfavourable to the Nyasaland Government.

The Devlin Report is the only example of a British judge examining whether the actions of a colonial administration in suppressing dissent were appropriate. It can be viewed not only as an incident in British decolonization, but as an expression of the values of judicial independence and commitment to the rule of law even in emergency conditions, when they are under threat. Devlin's conclusions that excessive force was used and that Nyasaland was a "police state" caused political uproar at the time. Devlin was not the first person to use the expression "police state" about a British colony; Richard Crossman had described Cyprus as an "amiable police state" in 1955, but it was unusual for this to be said in an official report. His report was largely rejected and the State of Emergency lasted until June 1960. Although the Devlin Report was initially discredited, in the longer term it helped to convince the British Government that the Federation was not acceptable to its African majority. Dr Banda was released from detention 1960 and the Federation was dissolved in 1963.

== Nyasaland Emergency 1959 ==
=== Causes of unrest ===
The twin themes of John Chilembwe's uprising in 1915, that educated Africans were denied an effective political voice and ordinary Africans did not share in the benefits of the colonial economy still applied in 1959. In the 1940s and early 1950s, the most pressing problem was African access to land, much of which had been converted into European owned estates on which African residents were required to undertake agricultural work for the owner under the system of thangata or engage in a form of sharecropping. Neither the Nyasaland nor British governments had dealt with land grievances, including the landowners' ability to legally evict surplus residents periodically. Attempts to enforce large-scale evictions in the Blantyre District in 1943 and 1950 were resisted, and in 1953 in the overcrowded Cholo district, the attempt to evict about 1,250 tenants on its tea estates and increase the rents of the rest led to serious riots and eleven deaths, with seventy-two people injured. As a result, the Nyasaland government agreed to purchase unused or under-used land, which was then allocated to African smallholders. By 1957, the government had purchased around 40% of the land formerly on private estates. At independence in 1964, private estate land had been reduced to less than 2% per cent of total land.

The government of Southern Rhodesia had proposed the amalgamation of Southern Rhodesia, Northern Rhodesia and Nyasaland in the 1930s and 1940s, despite almost unanimous African opposition. This made demands for African political rights more urgent, and in 1944 James Frederick Sangala promoted the formation of Nyasaland African Congress, which had around 5,000 members in 1953 Post-war British governments of both parties agreed to a federal solution for Central Africa, not full amalgamation, and the Federation of Rhodesia and Nyasaland was created in 1953 over strong African opposition. The Nyasaland African Congress started a campaign of non-violent resistance, but the Nyasaland government threatened to imprison Congress leaders: this forced them to end their protest, which lost Congress much of its popular support.

=== Congress revived ===
In 1956, the African representation on Nyasaland's Legislative Council was increased, and two young radicals, Henry Chipembere and Kanyama Chiume, secured nomination for Congress, giving it a significant voice and increasing membership to over 13,000 in 1957. However, several younger Congress members had little faith in the leader elected in January 1957, T D T Banda, because of his weak performance when discussing constitutional changes with the Nyasaland government, and wished to replace him with Dr Hastings Banda, then living in the Gold Coast, later Ghana. Dr Banda agreed to return after being promised the presidency of Congress and sweeping powers over the party, and he arrived Nyasaland in July 1958. He was implacably opposed to Federation, but otherwise far less radical that many younger Congress members

Although the Nyasaland African Congress was at first based in Blantyre, many branches were established in the Northern Province after 1955. Outside the Northern Province, rural support for Congress was patchy, but in Blantyre and other towns, it attracted young, marginalised men ready to participate in demonstrations.

=== Increasing unrest ===
On his return, Banda sought Nyasaland's withdrawal from the Federation and self-government rather than immediate independence. When the Federation was set up in 1953, its constitution and its member territories were to be reviewed in 1960, and Banda wanted African majorities on the bodies reviewing Nyasaland's membership. In the nine months before the declaration of an Emergency, Banda combined opposition to Federation with more popular issues to mobilise Congress supporters into strikes and largely non-violent protests that would disrupt the everyday operation of the colonial government.

Until October 1958, Congress leaders were in constitutional discussions with the Governor and did not endorse violent action by its own members. Sir Robert Armitage, the Governor since April 1956, favoured limited and slow constitutional development. His constitutional proposals of October 1958 ignored Banda's demands for an adequate electoral franchise for Nyasaland's Africans and proposed one that massively over-represented a tiny minority of Europeans and Asians. However, Alan Lennox-Boyd, the Colonial Secretary rejected even these limited proposals for reform making it clear that the protectorate would not be allowed to secede from the Federation. This led to increasingly aggressive Congress demonstrations from late October.

=== Failed negotiations ===
By the start of 1959, the British and Nyasaland governments and Congress were all convinced, for different reasons, that time was running out for them. At the end of 1958, Banda and other Congress leaders had attended an All-African People's Conference in Accra, Ghana, and had returned to Nyasaland determined to secure constitutional change. Meanwhile, by January 1959, the Colonial Office suggested that Banda and Congress would have to be "neutralised" to maintain the Federation, although what "neutralised" meant was not specified in the document.

In the first days of January 1959, Congress proposed substantial African representation on Nyasaland's governing bodies to Armitage: as this would lead to a demand to leave the Federation, it was rejected by the Governor. This apparent stalemate led Henry Chipembere and Kanyama Chiume to demand a more aggressive campaign of disobedience to colonial laws, which was designed to cause chaos. The proposed action included the intimidation of, and assaults on, police and government workers. Banda was more cautious, as a proposal had been made on 4 February for a British minister to visit Nyasaland in March to lower the political temperature, but he did not oppose escalating the campaign of civil disobedience.

Armitage's advice that the Colonial Office should cancel the proposed ministerial visit because of the increasing violence of Congress supporters and its leading activists' inflammatory statements made his declaration of a State of Emergency inevitable He asked for police reinforcements from Northern Rhodesia and Tanganyika, then troops from Northern and Southern Rhodesia, who arrived by 28 February Many of the white Southern Rhodesian troops were barely trained conscripts, but Armitage considered them more reliable than experienced African soldiers already in Nyasaland, fearing a possible mutiny.

=== The "murder plot" ===
In deciding to make widespread arrests, covering most of the Congress organisation, Armitage said he was influenced by reports of a secret meeting of Congress leaders, held in Banda's absence near Limbe on 25 January 1959. It is not disputed that the meeting approved a policy of strikes, retaliation against police violence, sabotage and defiance of the government. However, one agent code-named Baker, who claimed to have been present, confirmed that a campaign of violence had been discussed, and a further report of another agent, made only on 11 February, claimed that Congress had made a plan for systematic killings on "R-day", if Banda were arrested. The later report was the basis for the claim made by the Commissioner of Police that the meeting had planned the indiscriminate killing of Europeans and Asians, and also of those Africans opposed to Congress, the so-called "murder plot". There is no evidence that such a detailed and far-reaching murder plot ever existed, and also some uncertainty about what the Nyasaland and British governments considered was the true extent of the action proposed. However, the refusal of Banda and his colleagues to condemn the violent actions of some Congress members, directed mainly toward Africans who failed to support it, gave the reports some plausibility.

Lennox-Boyd and Julian Amery, the Under-Secretary of State at the Colonial Office both claimed during the House of Commons debate of 3 March 1958 that they had seen information making it clear that Congress planned a "massacre" or "bloodbath". However the opposition claimed that the allegations of a murder plot were "cooked up", and the Devlin Commission later asked whether it would have been better for the government to have published reasons for its belief in the murder plot before sanctioning a State of Emergency, as there was disbelief about an alleged plot that was publicly mentioned only after that event.

Armitage did not believe there was a coldly calculated plan worked out in detail. He did believe that there might have been some plan for the assassination of him and senior European officials, so that he had to take action to deal with any eventuality that might have been made possible by the such plans by declaring a State of Emergency.

=== The Emergency declared ===
On 3 March 1959 Armitage declared a State of Emergency over the whole of Nyasaland and arrested Dr. Hastings Banda, other members of the Congress executive committee and many local party officials. The Nyasaland African Congress was banned the next day. Those arrested were detained without trial, and their total number finally exceeded 1,300. Over 2,000 more were imprisoned for offences related to the Emergency, including rioting and criminal damage. The stated aim of these measures was to allow the Nyasaland government to restore law and order after the increasing lawlessness following Dr Banda's return. Rather than calming the situation immediately, 51 Africans were recorded as being killed between 20 February 1959 and 19 March 1959, and 79 people were known to have been wounded by bullets, but the total number of injuries was probably under-reported. During the punitive operations undertaken during the Emergency large numbers of people were beaten or 'roughed up'.

The initial reaction of many Congress supporters was rioting, damage to government and European property and strikes but within a few days, following action by the police and troops, the Southern Province became calm but tense. In the more remote areas, particularly in the Northern Province, the destruction of bridges and government buildings and rural resistance continued for several months organised by Flax Katoba Musopole. This continued resistance was countered by what the governor described as a campaign of harassment by troops and police, and allegations of brutality made against them were later considered by the Devlin Commission. It rejected some claims, including those of rape and torture made against Federation troops during a military action in the Misuku Hills, but it upheld other complaints, including the burning of houses, beatings and the imposition of arbitrary fine, which it considered illegal.

== The Devlin Commission ==
=== The Commission appointed ===
Within two days of the declaration of the State of Emergency, the British cabinet under Harold Macmillan decided to set up a Commission of Inquiry into the disturbances. There was a delay in finalising the form of the Commission and its membership, caused by disputes within the government and in parliament. The Secretary of State for the Colonies expressed doubts about an inquiry related to Nyasaland alone, and governor Armitage was opposed to any form of Commission, particularly one containing any member of parliament. Strong parliamentary pressure for its members' involvement arose because the government was suspected by the opposition of being influenced by Sir Roy Welensky, the Federal Prime Minister to suppress African opposition to Federation. The government published its justification for the Emergency in a despatch of 18 March from Armitage, explaining why he had decided to declare an Emergency. The despatch emphasised the supposed "murder plot" and the general plan of Congress, adopted on 25 January, to resist the Nyasaland government with violence, claiming Banda was involved in making this plan.

To forestall opposition members' involvement in a parliamentary enquiry, the cabinet decided on 17 March 1959 that the investigation would be carried out by a Commission of Inquiry composed of a presiding judge and three other members, and on 19 March, the cabinet decided on a "limited factual enquiry", which was announced by Lord Perth in a House of Lords debate on 24 March, when its composition was also announced. The commission was to inquire into and report on the recent disturbances in Nyasaland and the events leading up to them. In addition, a wider Royal Commission on the future of the Federation of Rhodesia and Nyasaland was to be held in 1960 (this became the Monckton Commission). The British government had made it clear that the Commission was not a judicial inquiry under the Tribunal of Inquiry (Evidence) Act 1921 which could make recommendations. However, Lennox-Boyd, the Colonial Secretary, said it should be semi-judicial in character, but that it should not make any recommendations, and its members included a judge as chairman and two others with judicial experience, one as a governor, the other as a magistrate.

Macmillan did not choose its chairman, Devlin, as he was out of the country. Devlin was proposed by the Lord Chancellor, Lord Kilmuir as someone of a known conservative disposition. The choice approved by R. A. Butler, then acting as Prime Minister, and Devlin's friend, Lord Perth, who was then a Minister of State in the Colonial Office, also played a part in his selection. Macmillan later criticised Devlin's appointment on the basis of his Irish ancestry and Catholic upbringing, and also his supposed disappointment at not being made Lord Chief Justice. Macmillan not only broadly rejected the Devlin Report, which had taken several months to prepare, but engineered the production of the rival Armitage Report, which was prepared very quickly so it could be released on the same day as the Devlin Report.

The chairman of the Commission of Inquiry was Patrick Devlin, born in 1905 and made a High Court judge at an early age in 1948. He was promoted to the Court of Appeal in 1960, and in 1961 was made a Law Lord. He retired in 1964, when aged 58 although, under the Judicial Pensions Act 1959, he could have served until the age of 75. However, he later denied this was because he was disappointed at not being offered the more senior posts of Lord Chief Justice or Master of the Rolls. The other three Commissioners were Edgar Williams, later Sir Edgar, the Warden of the Oxford College Rhodes House, Sir Percy Wyn-Harris and Sir John Primrose. Although Inquiries can be dominated by their chairmen, and Devlin certainly possessed a powerful personality, it is clear that Devlin's colleagues were a formidable team. Williams, then an academic historian, had been a brigadier and Montgomery's wartime chief intelligence officer, Wyn-Harris had much African experience in Kenya and as Governor of the Gambia, although Primrose, a Scottish Lord Provost, was less significant figure. Despite Devlin being vouched for by a Minister, Lord Perth, he was hardly an establishment figure; Wyn-Harris a former governor was described as the personification of decency and fair play and the two other Commissioners were both experienced and independently-minded.

=== The Commission in Nyasaland ===
The Commissioners arrived in the protectorate on 11 April and spent five weeks there, followed by a week in Southern Rhodesia and later spent four days discussing their findings in London. Although Devlin had been a Conservative supporter and the other commissioners were Conservatives Party members, the Commission went about its work in a way that concerned the Nyasaland government, which had hoped that its actions and the subsequent actions of the police and troops would be vindicated. Very soon after its arrival in Nyasaland, it became apparent that the Commissioners intended to investigate the declaration of the State of Emergency and the murder plot in detail rather than accept the Nyasaland government's statements unchallenged, and the Colonial Office prepared for a critical report, which the government might reject, wholly or in part.

The Commission took evidence from 455 individual witnesses and 1,300 witnesses in groups: the Nyasaland government also presented many documents to the Commission and its members later gave it oral evidence, but there were some problems with their cooperation. Very few Nyasaland Special Branch officers appeared before the Commission, as the Nyasaland government legal officers were concerned they might incriminate themselves, and argued that any officer summoned to appear should be accompanied by their superior. The Special Branch informants that gave information about the claimed murder plot were questioned by the Commission, reportedly in a hostile manner.

The British and Nyasaland governments were also concerned that Devlin in would question the roles of the Federal and Southern Rhodesian governments, and of Welensky's advice in particular, in influencing Armitage's decision to declare a State of Emergency, as it had denied opposition allegations made in the House of Commons of any such collusion. Both governments were generally successful in steering the Commission away from evidence that Armitage, Welensky and the Colonial Office had the political objective of eliminating Banda and the NAC in order to preserve the Federation as well as, or even rather than, preserving law and order in Nyasaland. It also managed to minimise discussion of Welensky's role, so that the Report said his intervention did not directly affect the decision to declare an Emergency, whereas documents not available to Devlin but released much later showed his intervention was more critical to its declaration.

Devlin considered that Armitage did not appreciate the role of the Commission and seemed unprepared for it, and the Colonial Office thought Armitage had been rather passive in his interactions with Devlin. On the other hand, a number of senior Nyasaland officials felt that Delvin, if not the other Commissioners, was determined to discredit the protectorate government and especially Armitage. Two days before the Commission left Nyasaland, Armitage and his senior officials met the Commissioners to discuss its draft findings and give their views on those findings. Following this meeting, the Colonial Office and Armitage became anxious to obtain a draft of the Commission's report as soon as possible.

== The Devlin Report and after ==
=== Report findings ===
The Commission's Report was largely drafted by Devlin but incorporated some material by Williams on the policing and military arrangements and the methods used in crowd dispersal. Wyn-Harris also produced some drafts on Federation and African opposition to it. The Commissioners met in London to consider and finalise the report, which was completed on 16 July 1959. Lennox-Boyd had explained to the Commissioners that the terms of reference purposely avoided enquiring into the underlying causes of the emergency, but did not rule out it enquiring into the declaration of a State of Emergency and whether there was a murder plot. Devlin acted like a trial judge directing a jury, emphasising that the conclusions to be drawn were for Lennox-Boyd to decide, but in summarising the facts, he added the inferences to be made from them and questions to be considered, which directed the Secretary of State towards a conclusion.

The Commission concentrated on three areas: the State of Emergency, the murder plot and African opposition to Federation. It found that the declaration of a State of Emergency was necessary to restore order and prevent a descent into anarchy. However, it criticised instances of the illegal use of force by the police and troops, including hut burning houses, destroying property, beatings and the degrading treatment of detainees, but rejected claims of rape and torture by the security forces. Its strongest criticism was over the "murder plot". What had been put to the Commission, according to Devlin, was a plot to assassinate the Governor and leading officials first, then to massacre all European adults, with children to be mutilated. It is this that the Commission said did not exist as a formed plot, except in the imagination of Special Branch. It also condemned the use made of it by both the Nyasaland and British governments in trying to justify the Emergency, and declared that Banda had no knowledge of the inflammatory talk of some Congress activists about attacking Europeans. Finally, it noted the almost universal rejection of Federation by Nyasaland's African people and suggested the British government should negotiate with African leaders on the country's constitutional future.

The Commission regarded Thomas Karua as an unreliable witness when it examined him in Nyasaland, and his testimony reflected badly on Special Branch methods. Karua was from Tanganyika: he had lived in Nyasaland for only a year before his arrest, and was employed by Congress as a motor mechanic and operated its cine-camera at Congress meetings. According to his own statement, he had an imperfect knowledge of the ChiNyanja vernacular in which meetings, including that of 24 and 25 January 1959, were mostly conducted. He was arrested and interned in Bulawayo: according to his account, he was approached by an Nyasaland Special Branch Inspector and asked to sign a prepared statement on the murder plot in exchange for a promise of release and repatriation to Tanganyika. The official version was that Karua and another internee approached prison officers offering to make voluntary statements.

After giving evidence to the Commission in Nyasaland in the presence of the protectorate's Solicitor-General and returning to Tanganyika, Karua repudiated his statement and was later brought to London and appeared before the Commission again. His story of being given a prepared statement to sign is supported by the experience of Edward Mwasi, detained in Nyasaland, who was offered the chance of release to take up the offer of a university place in the USA after seven months' detention if he signed a prepared statement that confirmed Congress had planned a general massacre of Europeans He rejected the offer, and was detained for six months longer.

The Commission also found that the Nyasaland government's suppression of criticism and of support for Congress justified calling it, in a widely quoted phrase, "no doubt only temporarily, a police state". Less than fifteen years after the defeat of Hitler, its parallel with fascism had particular force. No colonial government had been so heavily criticised by an official enquiry. Although the Commissioners realised that this phrase was offensive to the Nyasaland government and, by extension, to the British one, they were determined to include it. In part, this was because the Nyasaland police had taken the names of witnesses giving evidence to the Commission, which was supposed to be in private and confidential. Both Devlin and Williams later regretted that they had not explained what they had meant more fully. Devlin said the phrase indicated that the police were given and used extremely wide powers against individuals who were denied the ordinary protection of the courts. Williams thought it would have been better to clarify that the Commission meant, which was that, when an Emergency is declared, a country inevitably becomes a police state.

A few days after Devlin arrived in Nyasaland, Armitage received advice from the Colonial Office on the action to be followed when a governor dissented from the findings of a Commission of Inquiry, and was told that he could dissent if he felt it was justified. At the end of May, Armitage thought the Commission were satisfied that the State of Emergency was necessary, but did not accept that there was a massacre plan. The Commissioners had also, he considered, concentrated on the use of firearms and the burning of houses by government forces, ignoring events leading up to such incidents. He suspected that the Commission's report would be highly critical.

=== Devlin challenged ===
The Colonial Office obtained an early draft of the Commission's report and passed a copy to Armitage, which he used to prepare a document attacking its findings. Armitage then flew to London, where he joined a high level working party of ministers, Armitage and senior British and Nyasaland civil servants, which drafted a despatch, often known as the Armitage Report, to counter the Devlin Report. Devlin accepted that both the Colonial Office and Armitage should see the draft report before it was signed, although this was not normal practice, and he and the other Commissioners agreed to a number of changes that softened its criticisms. However, all the Commissioners later condemned the use made by the Colonial Office of their concession in allowing it to see the draft to prepare the hostile Armitage Report, although Wyn-Harris, more used to Colonial Office ways, was less surprised by this action than Devlin was.

In opening the Commons debate on the report on 28 July 1959 for the government, the Attorney-General Sir Reginald Manningham-Buller noted that the Commission had found the declaration of a State of Emergency justified, but he attacked its use of the expression "police state" and its rejection of talk about killings and beatings of Europeans as no more than rhetoric. Manningham-Buller also claimed that the government did not have to accept all or any the conclusions or recommendations of any Commission that it had set up. A section of the Armitage Report drafted by Amery accused the Commission of making a false distinction between a plan to assassinate a relatively small targeted group and one to initiate an indiscriminate massacre as both were murder. However Amery himself and Lennox-Boyd had both used the word "massacre" in the Commons debate of 3 March 1959.

Manningham-Buller used Amery's equation of any plan, however ill-defined or poorly thought-out, with those specific allegations made by the Commissioner of Police, and those put to the Commission, to reject the assertion in its Report that there was no "murder plot". Additionally, Manningham-Buller doubted the Commission's contention that unnecessary and illegal force, such as handcuffing and gagging prisoners, burning houses and other violent acts was used in arresting detainees in Operation Sunrise or after (while saying if this had been the case, it was a regrettable operational necessity), and rejected the conclusion that Banda was ignorant of the secret meeting of 25 January 1959, claiming that Banda was party to the planned violence. He did not mention Welensky, but James Callaghan, for the opposition noted that the Report showed that Welensky had intervened to advise Armitage to declare a State of Emergency, and that the later had made no mention of the murder plot until 7 March. Callahan also that rejected the Attorney-General's claim that the government did not have to accept the conclusions of this Commission, on the basis that it had been tasked with, and aimed at, setting out the relevant facts objectively and that it made no recommendations.

Lennox-Boyd, the Secretary of State for the Colonies closed the debate, claiming the government had the right and a duty to accept what little in the Commission's report that was favourable, and reject all that was unfavourable in it, instead of rejecting the whole report. Criticism of the government's failure to address the role of Welensky in the Commons debate was addressed the next day in the House of Lords, where Lord Perth noted that the Commission had stated Sir Roy's intervention was not directly on the question of whether or not an emergency should be declared.

Devlin's use of the phrase "a police state" caused deep offence, particularly as it was placed on the first page of his report. The governor of Nyasaland, Sir Robert Armitage, was incensed by the allegation, and the Secretary of State for the Colonies, Alan Lennox-Boyd, thought the claim was grossly unfair. Nyasaland did not have a particularly large police force for its population, but strong African resistance to the creation of the Federation of Rhodesia and Nyasaland led to a rapid increase in the police numbers from 860 to 1,100 in 1953, including a Police Mobile Force of armed riot squads. By 1959, Nyasaland had over 2,000 police. It was not the size or expansion of the police force which made Devlin claim that Nyasaland was a police state. He used the expression because in Nyasaland under the State of Emergency it was unsafe to express approval of Congress and unwise to make significant criticisms of its government. The Commissioners realised the problems in using the expression "police state", and it is likely that Colonial Office ministers could have persuaded Devlin to remove this expression, but they felt it would be unwise to press the Commission on this.

=== Devlin vindicated ===
Devlin, Williams and Primrose all felt let down by the government's reaction: Wyn-Harris was less surprised at the government's response, but anticipated that the Report would, in a few years, have its real honesty recognised. In the event, vindication came within a year, after Iain Macleod replaced Lennox-Boyd in October 1959.

The Nyasaland government had imprisoned Banda, not realising that he was the only African politician they could negotiate with on a credible constitution for the protectorate. Devlin's conclusion that there was no murder plot and that Banda, unlike other Congress leaders, was not involved in promoting violence opened the way for the British government to deal with him. Had Devlin found there was a murder plot or that Banda had directly encouraged violence, this would have been very difficult. Despite Lennox-Boyd's rejection of the Devlin Report, once Iain Macleod had replaced him at the Colonial Office, Devlin was approached by Macleod for advice. Macleod's subsequent minute to Macmillan decried the slow pace of the release of detainees, whose number was still increasing through new detentions, and he saw no reason to prolong the State of Emergency.

Armitage had no plans to resolve the political crisis in Nyasaland, other than the elimination of Banda and Congress and, from March 1959 he repeatedly sought Colonial Office approval either to ban Banda from returning to Nyasaland after his detention or to extend his detention (in Rhodesia or Nyasaland) indefinitely, and he was also unwilling to release most of the detainees. The Malawi Congress Party was formed as the successor to the banned Nyasaland African Congress by Orton Chirwa after his release from detention in August 1959 as interim President, although he acknowledged Banda as the party's true leader, a position Banda assumed on his own release and return to Nyasaland. Those other African politicians that had put themselves forward as moderate alternatives to Banda were, Armitage himself admitted, not credible and without influence. Armitage's hopes of negotiating with Orton Chirwa instead of Banda were dashed when Chirwa said that only Banda had the authority to do so. Armitage was resistant to releasing detainees to reduce their numbers, and his insistence on a detailed review of each case and his statement in July 1959 that he could not envisage releasing a hard core of 49 detainees caused tension with Macleod. In January 1960, Armitage also asked for extra troops from Southern Rhodesia when Banda was due to be released, a request that Macleod declined to authorise.

The Royal Commission on the future of the Federation of Rhodesia and Nyasaland (the Monckton Commission) toured the Federation in February 1960. It had been given limited terms of reference and was boycotted by the opposition Labour Party and the African nationalists in Nyasaland and Northern Rhodesia. As the Commission's composition seemed weighted towards a continuation of the Federation, its report disappointed the British government. The Monckton Commission reported widespread and sincere opposition to the Federation in the two northern territories. It considered that the Federation could not survive without at least a major devolution of powers to Nyasaland and Northern Rhodesia, giving more voting rights to Africans and lessening racial discrimination. Most importantly, it also recommended that Britain should retain the right to allow the secession of either northern territory, recognising that African nationalists would not accept even a modified Federation.

The British government broadly accepted the Monckton report, signalling a withdrawal of support for the Federation and the acceptance of early majority rule for Nyasaland and Northern Rhodesia. Accordingly, and despite opposition from Armitage, from the governments of the Federation and Southern Rhodesia, and from some colleagues in the cabinet, Macleod released Banda from detention on 1 April 1960 and immediately began to negotiate with him on Nyasaland's constitutional future. The State of Emergency was lifted on 16 June 1960. Following an overwhelming Malawi Congress Party victory in August 1961 elections, preparations were made for independence, which was achieved on 6 July 1964.

Even before Macleod's appointment, Lord Perth and Colonial Office officials expressed doubts in October 1959 about Armitage's belief that sufficient moderates could be found to supplant Congress or in his ability to negotiate with Banda, assuming the latter were released. Armitage was informed by Macmillan on 4 January 1960 of the proposal to release Banda in February (which was later deferred to 1 April) in an acrimonious meeting in which he accused Macmillan of being prepared to risk lives in Nyasaland for reasons of political expediency in Britain. This was during Macmillan's visit to Blantyre, part of the Prime Minister's six-nation African tour, during which demonstrations were held against the continuation of the Emergency, and a number of British journalists present made allegations of police brutality against what they described as a boisterous but largely peaceful demonstrators. Several British newspapers called for an impartial inquiry into the police handling of the demonstration, which Armitage opposed. However, Macleod bowed to press and parliamentary pressure and, on 2 February, agreed to a judge-led inquiry, instructing Armitage to arrange it. The ensuing Southworth Commission cleared the Nyasaland police of brutality and criticised British correspondents for distorting events. However, the press coverage highlighted to the British public and parliament the strength of African opposition to the Federation of Rhodesia and Nyasaland and the degree of coercion needed to preserve it, and further discredited Armitage.

Macmillan and Macleod decided not to dismiss Armitage immediately, but to appoint Glyn Smallwood Jones to take over as his successor in April 1961. Following Banda's release and the ending of the State of Emergency on 16 June 1960, Armitage, who did not trust Banda, was seen by Macleod as discredited and as an obstacle to constitutional progress. In August 1960, Macleod advised Armitage to go on leave pending his retirement, and he retired in April 1961 without returning to Nyasaland.

== Retrospective ==
The work of the Devlin Commission and its Report have both been re-examined in detail, in the light of archives now available in Britain and Malawi and interviews or correspondence with individuals involved, by a historian of late-colonial Malawi, Colin Baker, whose work has been reviewed by Hugh Macmillan and John McCracken, and by the legal historian, Brian Simpson. It is clear that neither the Nyasaland nor Federal governments wanted any inquiry at all, and the British government rejected calls for a parliamentary enquiry that would have had to include opposition parliamentarians. The last of these could possibly have rejected calls for a Commission of Inquiry, but hoped that one led by four members of the British Establishment would exonerate all three governments.

The Colonial Office was largely successful in concealing from the Commission evidence that it, Armitage and Welensky wished to eliminate Banda and the NAC to preserve the Federation. Later research has established the degree of interference by the Federal and Southern Rhodesian governments in the declaration of the Nyasaland Emergency. Although it was claimed at the time that the Southern Rhodesian Premier, Whitehead, had proclaimed a State of Emergency there to free up troops to send to Nyasaland, ostensibly in response to the concerns Armitage had expressed in mid-February, it is now clear that Whitehead had been planning to suppress the Southern Rhodesia African National Congress (SRANC) since December 1958, despite little or no evidence that it was acting unlawfully, and that he had Welensky's approval to do so. Armitage was only made aware of this plan at a meeting of Prime Ministers and governors in Salisbury on 20 February, at which the governor of Northern Rhodesia, Sir Arthur Benson was also put under pressure to act against African anti-Federal parties and declare a State of Emergency in Northern Rhodesia. He resisted this pressure, but did place restrictions on 47 Zambian African National Congress activists. Whitehead also wished to take control of security in southern Nyasaland as the price for loaning 900 police from Southern Rhodesia following Armitage's request for police reinforcements. It was an offer Armitage felt obliged to decline.

However, the Nyasaland government's actions on the murder plot were counter-productive. Devlin later said that he went into detail about the murder plot to establish whether the facts supported what was said in Armitage's despatch of 18 March on the reasons for declaring a State of Emergency. The failure to allow more than a few Nyasaland Special Branch officers to appear before the Commission forced the Commissioners to rely on questioning Congress members and the informants to the murder plot, who could not say how their often second-hand records of supposed conversations had been transformed into a detailed plot. Baker has suggested that, as Chipembere later admitted he had misled the Commission on the question of the level of violence intended, it was possible that he, Chisiza and a few extremists had discussed killing the governor and leading civil servants, but this proposal had not been put to everyone at the meeting or generally approved, which is why the majority of attendees examined could report no such suggestion was made. Such a limited plan by a few extremists was not what Armitage had reported or British ministers had stated in parliament.

Devlin's perspective on an Emergency that, overnight, made members of a legally-constituted political party liable to detention without trial for an unlimited period, was that the Nyasaland African Congress behaved as if Nyasaland was capable of functioning as a democracy, in the full sense of that word, and that its colonial Government was holding it back. That government, on the other hand, became increasingly intolerant of any opposition organised on western and democratic lines, because it considered it as equivalent to Congress setting up of a rival authority.

Baker, who served for eight years in the colonial civil service in Nyasaland, made four main criticisms of the Devlin Commission and Report. The most cogent, that Devlin was excessively legalistic in his outlook and disregarded administrative necessity, is considered in detail below. The other three issues were, firstly, that the Commission concentrated on what happened immediately before, during, and soon after, the Emergency was declared and why it was declared, rather than its longer-term causes. This was a consequence of the Commission's terms of reference which required it to enquire into the recent disturbances in Nyasaland and events leading up to it. However, as Lennox-Boyd's explained to the Commissioners, those terms purposely avoided an enquiry into the underlying causes of the Emergency. Second was Devlin's lack of experience of rural Africa and military matters, which was true, although Wyn-Harris and Williams respectively had backgrounds in these fields.

Thirdly, Baker argued that the process of preparing the Report was unduly rushed by Devlin, who did most of the drafting. He accepts that there was indirect pressure on Devlin to complete the Commission's Report quickly, but this led to some inconsistencies or errors that those drafting the Armitage Report seized on. He also refers to the unresolved differences between Devlin and Wyn-Harris on the final paragraphs of the draft report, which led to this section being omitted from the final version. In his view, these matters increased the risk that the government would reject the report However, although some minor changes were made to the report at the suggestion of Lord Perth, one softening the argument that there was nothing in the murder plot, another removing a sentence critical of police indifference to the rule of law, and one removing statements that there was no official expression of regret about burning huts, the British government preferred to attack the Commission's Report rather than amend it.

On Devlin's legalistic approach, Armitage's principal defence for declaring the State of Emergency was that immediate action would prevent future bloodshed but Devlin (Baker claims) took no account of administrative necessity, only legality, and was less concerned by the Nkhata Bay killings, where the District Commissioner acted lawfully than cases were individuals were beaten or had their homes destroyed illegally.

Baker's account of the 1959 State of Emergency was criticised by Macmillan as based largely on official documents in the government archives and on the papers of, and interviews with, former British and colonial officials, such that it amounts to a partisan defence Sir Robert Armitage and his officials. Armitage, in Macmillan's opinion, failed in Cyprus and failed again in Nyasaland through a lack of political judgement, including a failure to understand nationalism in either dependency. McCracken also considers Armitage had failed to control a political crisis in Cyprus, so was determined not to fail again in Nyasaland, and that, by October 1959, the contempt he expressed for African political aspirations, even in official correspondence, amounted to racial paranoia. McCracken also suggests that Baker's underlying aim was to "set the record straight" by restoring the reputation of Nyasaland's colonial officials of the 1950s and 1960s, while attacking African nationalists and their sympathisers. Like Macmillan, he notes Baker's reliance on official sources, including Special Branch reports, and the recollections of expatriates, and the reduction of African leaders to stereotypes.

The suggestion that Devlin did not accept that administrative urgency or claims that an illegal act by an administration may be justified if its intention is to prevent greater illegality is borne out by Devlin's own statement of principle:

" where a government is the law-maker it must be scrupulous in observing its own laws."

In stating this principle, he differed from Wyn-Harris, who had extensive colonial service and thought that, in emergency conditions, breaches of strict law might be justifiable, but wanton inhumanity never could be. However, the issue of whether the rule of law could mean a different thing in a British dependency than in Britain itself was summed up by Enoch Powell in the debate of 27 July 1959 on the Hola massacre, which raised the same issue as in the Nyasaland Emergency: Powell said:

" Nor can we pick and choose where and in what part of the world we use this or that standard. We cannot say 'we will use African standards in Africa, Asian standards in Asia, and perhaps British standards here at home'. We do not have that choice to make"

Before the report had been finalised, Devlin agreed with Lords Perth that his report set out to deal with two important points of principle, which were:

(a) It was necessary for this country (the United Kingdom), as for any other colonial power, to choose between benevolent despotic rule or else be prepared to release responsibility to the natives.

(b) Colonial administration does not seem to concern itself with the law as such.

Since 1945 Britain had been engaged in fighting a series of colonial insurrections in Palestine, Malaya, Kenya, Cyprus and now Nyasaland, so the first point was not unexpected. Devlin's second point caused some conflict with the other Commissioners over the degree to which the report should emphasise this lack of respect for the rule of law and much of Devlin's concluding section was removed. He left in the Devlin Report, even in its expurgated form, a notable expression of the judicial ideal of the rule of law, and his belief that the rule of law should continue conditions of colonial emergency.

== Sources ==
- C Baker, (1993). Seeds of Trouble: Government Policy and Land Rights in Nyasaland, 1946–1964, London, British Academic Press.
- C Baker, (1997). State of Emergency: Nyasaland 1959, I.B.Tauris. ISBN 1-86064-068-0.
- C Baker, (1997). Nyasaland, 1959: A Police State? The Society of Malawi Journal, Vol. 50, No. 2.
- C Baker, (1998). Retreat from Empire: Sir Robert Armitage in Africa and Cyprus, I. B. Tauris. ISBN 978-1-86064-223-4.
- C Baker, (2007). The Mechanics of Rebuttal: The British and Nyasaland Governments' Response to The Devlin Report, 1959, The Society of Malawi Journal, Vol. 60, No. 2.
- R. Coffey (2015). Does the Daily Paper rule Britannia: The British Press, British Public Opinion, and the End of Empire in Africa, 1957–60.
- J Darwin, (1988). Britain and Decolonisation. The Retreat from Empire in the Post-War World, London, Palgrave ISBN 978-0-33329-258-7
- J Darwin, (1994). The Central African Emergency, 1959, in R Holland (editor), Emergencies and Disorder in the European Empires After 1945, Abingdon, Routledge. ISBN 0-71464-109-X.
- A Horne, (2008) Macmillan: The Official Biography, Pan Macmillan. ISBN 0-230-73881-8.
- Hansard, House of Commons, (1959). Nyasaland (State of Emergency) Debate 3 March 1959 Vol. 601 Columns 279–345.
- Hansard, House of Commons, (1959). Nyasaland (Report of Commission of Inquiry) Debate 28 July 1959 Vol. 610 Columns 317–449.
- Hansard, House of Lords, (1959). Nyasaland (Report of Commission of Inquiry) Debate 29 July 1959 Vol. 218 Columns 758–761.
- The Independent, (1992). Obituary of Lord Devlin. https://www.independent.co.uk/news/people/obituary-lord-devlin-1539619.html
- J McCracken, (1998). Democracy and Nationalism in Historical Perspective: The Case of Malawi, African Affairs, Vol. 97, No. 387.
- J McCracken, (2003). 'Setting the Record Straight'? Transition in Colonial Malawi, Journal of Southern African Studies, Vol. 29, No. 3.
- J McCraken, (2012). A History of Malawi, 1859–1966, Woodbridge, James Currey. ISBN 978-1-84701-050-6.
- H Macmillan, (1998). Review of "State of Emergency: Crisis in Central Africa", Journal of Southern African Studies, Vol. 24, No. 3.
- P. Murphy, (2010). A Police State? The Nyasaland Emergency and Colonial Intelligence, Journal of Southern African Studies, Vol. 36, No. 4.
- E D Mwasi, (2006). Reminiscences of My Detention, 1959–1960. The Society of Malawi Journal, Vol. 59, No. 2.
- B Pachai (1973) Land Policies in Malawi: An Examination of the Colonial Legacy, The Journal of African History, Vol. 14, No. 4.
- R Palmer, (1986). Working Conditions and Worker Responses on the Nyasaland Tea Estates, 1930–1953, Journal of African History, Vol. 27, No. 1.
- C Parkinson, (2007) Bills of Rights and Decolonization: The Emergence of Domestic Human Rights Instruments in Britain's Overseas Territories, Oxford University Press. ISBN 0-19-923193-1.
- J Power, (2010). Political culture and nationalism in Malawi: building Kwacha. University Rochester Press. ISBN 1-58046-310-X.
- A C Ross, (2009). Colonialism to cabinet crisis: a political history of Malawi, African Books Collective. ISBN 978-99908-87-75-4.
- R I Rotberg, (1965). The Rise of Nationalism in Central Africa: The Making of Malawi and Zambia, 1873–1964, Cambridge (Mass), Harvard University Press.
- C. Sanger, (1960). Central African Emergency, London, Heinemann.
- B Simpson, (2002). The Devlin Commission (1959): Colonialism, Emergencies, and the Rule of Law, Oxford Journal of Legal Studies, Vol. 22, No. 1, pp. 17–52.
