= Flax Katoba Musopole =

Flax Katoba Musopole (1918 - 1989) was a radical and militant African nationalist in late colonial Malawi, who was imprisoned after conducting a campaign of sabotage and intimidation for several months in the north of the country in 1959. After Malawi's independence, he became a member of the Malawi parliament and an advocate of the authoritarian and centralising policies of its first President, Hastings Banda. He was rewarded with posts as a junior minister and in Malawi’s diplomatic service, but retired from politics in 1969, spending the rest of his life in relative obscurity.

Musopole was born in the Northern Province of what was then Nyasaland. He went to South Africa as a labour migrant in the 1940s, and became radicalised there, forging links to the South African Communist Party. He returned to Nyasaland in 1955 and began a campaign against colonialism and the Federation of Rhodesia and Nyasaland that capitalised on existing popular discontent with colonial agricultural measures, developing a radical, peasant-based anti-government movement in the north of the country. Musopole promoted mass membership of the Nyasaland African Congress throughout the Northern Province and organised boycotts of the agricultural regulations. In February 1959, he led a campaign designed to paralyse colonial rule in Northern Province through unauthorised demonstrations and clashes with police. These disturbances were one of the triggers for the declaration of a State of emergency in March 1959, which led to the arrest and imprisonment of most Nyasaland African Congress leaders. However, Musopole and a number of his followers evaded arrest and conducted an armed campaign against the security forces until his capture in Tanganyika in August 1959. He was convicted of sedition and imprisoned for two years.

After his release from prison, he was elected to the Malawi Parliament in 1964. At the time of the Cabinet Crisis of 1964 in Malawi, he supported President Hastings Banda against the ministers, many from the Northern Region, who sought to restrict Banda’s power. He was subsequently appointed as a junior minister and, in 1967, was assigned to the Malawian mission to the United Nations. After two years, Musopole was sent to the Malawi Labour Office in Botswana and soon after, he returned to Malawi, left politics and became a businessman in his home district of Chitipa.

== Early life and education ==
Much of Flax Musopole’s early life is obscure and is known only through his own or his relatives’ later accounts. He was born in the Misuku Hills area of Chitipa District, Malawi, which was then part of the Karonga District of Nyasaland in 1918 and attended local elementary schools and then a Senior Primary school run by the Church of Scotland on the Karonga lakeshore. He may also have attended a senior school at the Livingstonia Mission

Musopole’s activities before he migrated to South Africa in the 1940s are unclear, but in South Africa he worked as a clerk in several businesses in the Johannesburg area and passed the South Africa university matriculation examinations through correspondence study. This qualified him to enter the University of Cape Town in 1952 and he either entered the university in that year, leaving without graduating two years later, or interacted with students at the universities of Cape Town and Witwatersrand without matriculating in either. During his time in South Africa, Musopole became an atheist and a strong advocate of anti-colonialism, becoming involved in the Defiance Campaign there, and forming links to the South African Communist Party (SACP). Although he returned to Nyasaland in 1955, Musopole maintained links with the SACP, which in 1957 sponsored him for a scholarship the Moscow State University, which he did not take up.

== Opposing the colonial government ==
In 1954, there were less than 1,000 paid-up members of the Nyasaland African Congress, which had been founded in 1944. The membership consisted mainly of clerks and businessmen based in the south of the protectorate and prosperous tobacco-growers from the Central Province. Northern branches were few and Congress did not seek mass membership. The growth of Congress from a moribund talking-shop in 1955, when Musopole returned to Nyasaland, to a dynamic mass party in 1959 was less through the activities of educated members in the south than expansion through the recruitment of peasants in Nyasaland's north. Musopole was central to this growth, which resulted in 48 out of Nyasaland’s 63 Congress branches being in the Northern Province by 1959, even though this was the least populous of the three provinces.

Musopole was described by the Nyasaland police in 1957 as ‘a known Communist sympathiser’. He was later joined in the Northern Province by Gilbert Kumtumanje, who had lived in Southern Rhodesia for ten years and had been President of the Mashonaland Province branch of the Nyasaland Congress before his expulsion from Southern Rhodesia in December 1957. Kumtumanje and Musopole were supported by the younger Kanyama Chiume and R. R. Chumia, and these four reinvigorated Congress throughout the Northern Province, opening new branches and building up a substantial following in the towns along Lake Malawi. Chiume, Musopole and Chumia were described by the police as ‘the main driving force’ behind Congress in the Northern Province.

Musopole and his associates were able to find many supporters because peasant farmers in the north were adversely affected by colonial agricultural and land conservation policies. Firstly, government agricultural officers targeted a local system of cultivating millet that involved cutting down and burning trees and planting millet in the wood ash. As the millet was mainly used to brew beer, it was widely condemned by administrators and agricultural officers in the north as both morally and environmentally destructive. From 1938, a comprehensive soil conservation scheme, the Misuku Land Usage Scheme, was introduced in the Misuku Hills in the extreme north of the Northern Province. This scheme involved attempts to stop deforestation, to promote the growing of coffee, to restrict the growing of millet and to reduce the numbers of cattle and the extent of grazing land for them. Soil erosion on hilly areas was to be countered by the construction of contour ridges, which took significant amounts of land out of cultivation and involved onerous and unpaid work by the local people to create them. Contour ridging was not applied on the flat Karonga Lakeshore, but owners of the many cattle there had to register their animals and take them to government cattle dipping tanks regularly.

The opposition of peasants was at first unorganised and passive, and included some farmers fleeing across the nearby borders of Tanganyika and Northern Rhodesia. It was nevertheless reasonably successful in many areas of the Northern Province, because the colonial authorities had too few agricultural officers and police to enforce conservation rules, and local courts were unwilling to punish defaulters, so the regulations were largely ignored Once Musopole returned to the province, he organised demonstrations, strikes and boycotts as part of a scheme of more active opposition to the agricultural rules, in particular those relating to coffee growing in the Misuku Hills and the compulsory cattle dipping in Karonga, and he promoted the traditional method of cultivating millet that involved burning trees.

== State of Emergency ==
In January 1959, the governor of Nyasaland, Sir Robert Armitage, after consulting Alan Lennox-Boyd, the Colonial Secretary, rejected the proposals of the Nyasaland African Congress for constitutional change that would have led to an African majority in the Nyasaland legislature, and he suspended constitutional talks with Congress In view of this apparent stalemate, Kanyama Chiume was one of the Congress leaders that led demands for the party to escalate its campaign of anti-government protests and disobedience. He proposed action involving unauthorised demonstrations which would lead to arrests, followed by protests in favour of those arrested, and the intimidation of police and government workers in a cycle designed to cause chaos. Musopole, Chiume, Kumtumanje and Chumia orchestrated an outbreak of violent protest in the Northern Province that brought colonial rule there to a standstill. Rioting began on 8 February when police tried to stop meetings called by Congress leaders without official sanction. Karonga town was taken over by a crowd of about 600 demonstrators on 19 February and the Fort Hill aerodrome, from where the Witwatersrand Native Labour Association flew mineworkers to South Africa, was occupied the next day. In the same month, Musopole directed attacks that damaged mission properties at Livingstonia, Ekwendeni and Loudon, during which some African teachers were beaten and others fled.

Despite this violence and the deteriorating security situation, the Nyasaland government continued to negotiate with Banda and other Congress leaders until late February 1959, but the governor then decided against offering any concessions. He made preparations for mass arrests of Congress leaders and declared a State of Emergency on 3 March 1959. Operation Sunrise, the police and military campaign to arrest and detain Congress leaders immediately after the emergency was declared, involved mass arrests of those individuals identified as Congress leaders or advocates of violence. Most of those scheduled for arrest in the Karonga and Chitipa districts were apprehended on 3 March, and armed police shot dead two demonstrators who were trying to secure their release in Karonga town on the same day.

Musopole was able to evade arrest and immediately began organising the sabotage of conservation projects and road bridges, the destruction of government buildings and the intimidation of government workers. He and his armed followers travelling widely over the Northern Province, unhindered at first by the limited security force presence in the area. In the Misuku Hills, property belonging to two missions was also destroyed

Once the Southern Province was brought fully under control in April 1959, military forces from Southern Rhodesia were sent to the north as part of Operation Crewcut, which was specifically aimed at capturing Musopole and more generally at ending support for Congress in the north. This operation proved abortive, as almost a fortnight of intensive patrolling left Musopole and his followers at liberty in the Misuku hills or in neighbouring Tanganyika. Operation Crewcut ended in October 1959, by which time over a thousand suspected members of Congress had been convicted of criminal offences, collective fines had been imposed on several areas, many homes and much other property had been destroyed and large numbers of Africans had been physically abused by the troops involved. The Devlin Commission later upheld complaints about frequent house burnings, arbitrary fines and bullying behaviour, all of which it considered to be illegal and excessive.

The violent and destructive activities of Musopole and his supporters and their intimidation of those that wished to remain neutral alienated some, but were seen as legitimate opposition to the colonial government by many local Congress supporters. Musopole was finally arrested in Tanganyika in August 1959. He was returned to Nyasaland and charged with sedition, being defended at his trial by the eminent British lawyer and Labour Party politician Dingle Foot. After conviction, he served two and a half years in prison and was released in March 1962.

== Malawi politician ==
As he was in prison, Musopole had little contact with his political base in Chitipa or with the Malawi Congress Party, formed in 1959 to replace the banned Nyasaland African Congress, which was less strong in the Northern Province than in the centre and south of the country. By the time of his release in 1962, he had little choice but to join the dominant new party, which found him a position as clerk of the Karonga District council. As he was a prisoner at the time, Musopole had been ineligible to stand in the 1961 Legislative Council election but, on his release, he was nominated to the Malawi Congress Party’s candidate for the newly created Karonga West (later, Chitipa) constituency. He was elected in the pre-independence election of 1964 as the constituency's first Member of parliament.

Shortly after his election Musopole became involved in the Cabinet Crisis of September 1964. As every Member of parliament was required to speak in the emergency debate that followed the dismissal of three cabinet ministers and the resignation of four more in sympathy with them, neutrality was impossible. Although Musopole acknowledged that these ministers, in particular Kanyama Chiume, were his friends, he pledged loyalty to Banda. He was rewarded by being appointed as Parliamentary secretary in the Ministry of Community Development in October 1964. McCracken has suggested that Musopole’s apparent unquestioning support for Banda could be an honest conviction reflecting authoritarian attitudes that he had adopted as the result of his exposure to Communist ideology, rather than to the liberal views accepted by the ministers who had completed their university education and had not had contact with Communist parties or sympathisers.

== Later life ==
In 1967, Musopole was assigned to the Malawian mission to the United Nations but, after two years, he was sent to the Malawi Labour Office in Botswana, an apparent demotion. Within a short time, he left politics and diplomacy and returned to Chitipa where he became a businessman. There is very little information about his final two decades.

Flax Katoba Musopole died in Chitipa in 1989.

== Sources ==
- Groves, Zoe (2013) 'Transnational Migration and Pan-African Solidarity: the case of the Central African Federation, 1953-1963' African Studies', Vol. 72, No2, pp. 155–75.
- Kalinga, Owen (2010). 'The 1959 Nyasaland State of Emergency in Old Karonga District', Journal of Southern African Studies, Vol. 36, No. 4, pp. 743–763.
- Kalinga, Owen (2012). 'Historical Dictionary of Malawi' (fourth edition)', Toronto, Scarecrow Press, ISBN 978-0-8108-5961-6.
- McCracken, John (2002). 'The Ambiguities of Nationalism: Flax Musopole and the Northern Factor in Malawian Politics, c. 1956–1966', Journal of Southern African Studies, Vol. 28, No. 1, Special Issue: Malawi.
- McCracken, John (2012). 'A History of Malawi, 1859–1966', Woodbridge, James Currey. ISBN 978-1-84701-050-6.
