= Armitage Report =

The Armitage Report was a report into the actions of the Nyasaland government in declaring a State of Emergency in March 1959 and actions of the police and troops in the aftermath of that declaration. It was supposed to have been a despatch prepared in Nyasaland by the Governor of that protectorate, Robert Perceval Armitage, but was in fact prepared in London by a working party that included Armitage, British government ministers and senior Colonial Office officials, in an attempt to counteract various criticisms contained in the Report of the Devlin Commission. Both reports accepted that a State of Emergency was necessary in view of the level of unrest in Nyasaland, but the Armitage Report approved of the subsequent actions of the police and troops, whereas the Devlin Report criticised their illegal use of force and stigmatised the Nyasaland government's suppression of criticism as justifying it being called a "police state". Although the Armitage Report was used by the government of the day to discredit the Devlin Report initially, and to justify its rejection of many of the Devlin Commission's findings, in the longer term the Devlin Report helped to convince the British Government that the Federation of Rhodesia and Nyasaland was not acceptable to its African majority and should be dissolved. Devlin was vindicated and approached for advice on constitutional change, but Armitage was seen as an obstacle to progress and asked to leave Nyasaland prematurely.

== Unrest in Nyasaland ==
In the 1940s and early 1950s, the most pressing problem in Nyasaland was that of African access to land. Between 1892 and 1894, about 15% of the total land area of the Nyasaland, including over 350,000 hectares of the best land in the Shire Highlands, the most densely populated part of the country, had been turned into European-owned estates. Africans who were resident on these estates were required to pay rent, normally satisfied by undertaking agricultural work for the owner under the system known as thangata, which later developed into a form of sharecropping. By the 1940s, very little land on these estates, except for tea estates, was farmed directly by the estate owners: elsewhere the land was farmed by African tenants. Tensions between estate owners and tenants remained high up to the early 1950s. There were riots in some overcrowded districts in 1945 and between 1950 and 1953 related to evictions and rent increases, and riots in August 1953 led to eleven dead and seventy-two injured. The Abrahams Commission (also known the 1946 Land Commission) was appointed by the Nyasaland government to inquire into land issues in Nyasaland following these riots and disturbances. Abrahams proposed that the Nyasaland government should purchase all unused or under-used freehold land on the estates, which would be allocated to African smallholders as Native Trust Land. The programme of land acquisition accelerated after 1951, and by 1957 the government had negotiated the purchase of most of the land it had targeted for purchase.

In the same period, the political aspirations of Nyasaland's Africans received a set-back. Agitation by the Southern Rhodesia government led to a Royal Commission (the Bledisloe Commission) on future association between Southern Rhodesia, Northern Rhodesia and Nyasaland: its report in 1939 did not rule-out some form of future association between Southern Rhodesia and the two territories north of the Zambezi. The threat of Southern Rhodesian rule channeled African political demands into the Nyasaland African Congress. From 1946, the Nyasaland African Congress received financial and political support from Hastings Banda, then living in Britain. Post-war British governments of both main parties agreed to a federal solution for Central Africa, not the full amalgamation that the Southern Rhodesian government preferred. The Federation of Rhodesia and Nyasaland was pushed through in 1953 against very strong African opposition. The main African objections to the Federation were that political domination by the white minority of Southern Rhodesia would prevent greater African political participation and that control by Southern Rhodesian politicians would lead to an extension of racial discrimination and segregation.

In 1957, some members of the Nyasaland African Congress invited Hastings Banda, then living in the Gold Coast to return to Nyasaland, which he did in July 1958, becoming the president of Congress. Banda was absolutely opposed to Federation, but otherwise quite moderate and far less radical that younger Congress members. In the nine months between his return and the declaration of a State of Emergency, he combined opposition to Federation with more popular causes, such as opposition to agricultural practices imposed on Africa farmers, which aimed to promote soil conservation, and also the remnants of thangata. Banda's strategy was to use these popular issues to mobilise Congress supporters into strikes, demonstrations, disobedience and protests that would disrupt the everyday operation of the colonial government.

== The Emergency and the Devlin Commission ==
In December 1958, Banda presented Congress proposals for an African majority in the Legislative Council to the governor, Sir Robert Armitage. Armitage was not opposed to limited constitutional development, envisaging autonomy for Nyasaland with the Federation, with African majority rule deferred to some distant future date, but Alan Lennox-Boyd, the Colonial Secretary, rejected any plan for the protectorate having local autonomy and, in early January 1959, the Colonial Office made it clear that, as the protectorate would not be allowed to leave the Federation, Banda and Congress would have to be neutralised.

The governor therefore rejected the Congress proposals that would inevitably lead to a demand for withdrawal from the Federation. This breakdown in talks led to Congress demands for an escalation of anti-government protests and more violent action. Action by Congress supporters became more violent and, on 21 February, and, in the days immediately following, police or troops opened fire on rioters in several places, leading to four deaths.

Armitage decided against offering any concessions to Congress, and drafted plans for mass arrests covering of almost the whole of the Congress organisation. He later claimed to have been influenced by reports of a meeting of Congress leaders (held in Banda's absence) on 25 January 1959, which approved a policy of strikes, retaliation against police violence, sabotage and defiance of the government. Reports by police informers formed the basis for the claim by the Head of Special Branch that there were plans for the indiscriminate killing of Europeans, Asians and of those Africans opposed to Congress (the so-called "murder plot"). However, the Nyasaland government took no immediate action against Banda or other Congress leaders in January 1959, and continued to negotiate with them until late February. The governor also made no specific reference to the "murder plot" until after his declaration of a State of Emergency had failed to restore order quickly. However, Banda and his colleagues refused to condemn the violent actions of Congress members, which were increasingly directed against Africans who failed to support Congress.

After the breakdown of talks in late February, Armitage made preparations for a State of Emergency in Nyasaland, which were approved by the Colonial Office. After consulting the Federal Prime Minister, Roy Welensky and the Southern Rhodesia Premier, Edgar Whitehead, and with the approval of the Colonial Office, over 1,000 European troops of the Rhodesia Regiment were flown into Nyasaland, the first arriving on 27 and 28 February On 3 March 1959 Armitage, as governor of Nyasaland, declared a State of Emergency over the whole of the protectorate and arrested Dr. Banda, the Congress president, and other members of its executive committee as well as over a hundred local party officials. The Nyasaland African Congress was banned the next day. Those arrested were detained without trial and the total number detained finally rose to over 1,300. Over 2,000 more were imprisoned for offences related to the emergency, including rioting and criminal damage. The stated aim of these measures was to allow the Nyasaland government to restore law and order after the increasing lawlessness following Dr Banda's return. However, they failed to calm the situation immediately and a significant number of Africans were killed and wounded up to 19 March. The arrests were made as part of " Operation Sunrise", so called because the State of Emergency was declared just after midnight on 3 March and arrest squads were sent out at 4.30 am. By 6 am most principal Congress leaders had been arrested and detained, by 9 pm that day 130 had been arrested. Some were released quickly, but 72 prominent detainees, including Dr Banda, were flown to Southern Rhodesia later on 3 March. Others were detained in Nyasaland. In immediate aftermath of Operation Sunrise, 21 people were killed on 3 March.

In the debate in the House of Commons on 3 March 1959, the day that the State of Emergency was declared, Alan Lennox-Boyd, the Colonial Secretary, stated that it was clear from information received that Congress had planned the widespread murder of Europeans, Asians and moderate Africans, "... in fact, a massacre was being planned". This was the first public mention of a murder plot and, later in the same debate, the Minister of State at the Colonial Office, Julian Amery, reinforced what Lennox-Boyd had said with talk of a "... conspiracy of murder" and "a massacre ... on a Kenyan scale". It was subsequently difficult for ministers to repudiate these statements. However, opposition politicians made allegations of collusion between the Federal Prime Minister, Welensky, and Armitage to arrest Congress supporters in order to preserve the Federation rather than to secure peace and order in Nyasaland. This was denied by the government despite Welensky providing the troops that made declaring the Emergency possible and the Colonial Office plan to eliminate Congress.

Within two days of the declaration of the state of emergency, the British cabinet under Harold Macmillan decided to set up a Commission of Inquiry into the disturbances. In addition, a wider Royal Commission on the future of the Federation of Rhodesia and Nyasaland was to be held in 1960. The chairman of the Commission of Inquiry was Patrick Devlin, who had been born in 1905 and made a High Court judge in 1948. Its three other members included a former colonial governor, the head of an Oxford College and a Scottish Lord Provost. Macmillan, who was out of the country at the time, did not choose Devlin and later criticised his appointment on the basis that his Irish ancestry and Catholic upbringing made him too sympathetic to the Nyasaland African Congress. Macmillan not only broadly rejected the Devlin Report, which had taken several months to prepare, but engineered the production of the rival Armitage Report, which was prepared very quickly, mostly in the course of a weekend, so it could be released on the same day as the Devlin Report.

Although Devlin had been a Conservative supporter and the other Commissioners were Conservatives party members, the Commission went about its work in a way that concerned the Nyasaland government, which had hoped that its declaration of the State of Emergency and the subsequent actions of the police and troops would be vindicated. The Commission concentrated on three areas: the State of Emergency, the murder plot and African opposition to Federation. It found that the declaration of a State of Emergency was necessary to restore order and prevent a descent into anarchy, but it criticised instances of the illegal use of force by the police and troops, including burning houses, destroying property and beatings. It also found that the Nyasaland government's suppression of criticism and of support for Congress justified calling it being called a "police state". Its strongest criticism was over the "murder plot", which it said not exist, and it condemned the use made of it by both the Nyasaland and British governments in trying to justify the Emergency. It also declared that Banda had no knowledge of the inflammatory talk of some Congress activists about attacking Europeans. Finally, it noted the almost universal rejection of Federation by Nyasaland's African people and suggested the British government should negotiate with African leaders on the country's constitutional future.

== The Armitage Report ==
A few days after Devlin arrived in Nyasaland, Armitage received advice from the Colonial Office on the action to be followed when a Governor dissented from the findings of a Commission of Inquiry, and was told that he could dissent if he felt it was justified. At the end of May, Armitage thought the Commission was satisfied that the State of Emergency was necessary, but that it did not accept that there was a massacre plot, and that it had concentrated on the use of firearms and the burning of houses by government forces, ignoring events leading up to such incidents. He suspected that the Commission's report would be highly critical. The Commission's use of the phrase "a police state" caused deep offence, particularly as it was placed on the first page of his report. Armitage was incensed by this allegation, and the Secretary of State for the Colonies, Alan Lennox-Boyd, thought the claim was grossly unfair.

In May and June 1959, a number of issues caused Armitage and the Colonial Office concerns, in case the Devlin Commission should take note of them in producing its report. The most significant was the publication of the Nyasaland Government Information Department’s Bulletin, which stated that it was “…the government’s intention to clean the country of Congress now and keep it clean always…”, a reference to the political objective in declaring the State of Emergency, which both British and Nyasaland governments had consistently denied

The Colonial Office obtained an early draft of the Commission's report and passed a copy to Armitage, which he used to prepare a document attacking its findings. Armitage and two senior Nyasaland civil servants then flew to London, where they joined a high level working party which drafted a despatch, often known as the Armitage Report, to counter the Devlin Report. The working party consisted of three British ministers, Julian Amery, Reginald Manningham-Buller, the Attorney-General and Lord Kilmuir the Lord Chancellor and senior civil servants, together with Armitage and his two aides. It met at Chequers on 18 July 1959 and worked through the weekend to consider the British government’s response to the draft of the Devlin Report it had.

In the Commons debate on the Devlin Report, the government noted that the Commission had found the declaration of a State of Emergency justified, but it attacked their use of the expression "police state" and its rejection of any talk about killings and beatings of Europeans as no more than rhetoric. The government also minimised Devlin's criticisms of handcuffing and gagging prisoners, burning houses and other illegal acts on the grounds of necessity. It made full use of the Armitage Report to support its attack, claiming it represented the considered views of Nyasaland-based officials with a better grasp if realities than a Commission that visited Nyasaland only briefly. The Secretary of State for the Colonies said that the government had the right and a duty to reject any of the Devlin Commission's conclusions or recommendations where it disagreed with them, and used this argument to justify accepting only what little in its report was favourable and rejecting all that was unfavourable, instead of rejecting the whole report. The opposition rejected the claim that the government did not have to accept the conclusions of the Commission on the basis that it had set out the relevant facts objectively and that it made no recommendations.

The Devlin Report is the only example of a British judge examining whether the actions of a colonial administration in suppressing dissent were appropriate. The Nyasaland government had imprisoned Banda, not realising that he was the only African politician they could negotiate with on a credible constitution for the protectorate. Devlin's conclusion that there was no murder plot and that Banda, unlike other Congress leaders, was not involved in promoting violence opened the way for the British government to deal with him. Had Devlin found there was a murder plot and that Banda had encouraged violence, this would have been very difficult.

Despite Lennox-Boyd's rejection of the Devlin Report, once Iain Macleod replaced him at the Colonial Office late in 1959, Devlin was approached by Macleod for advice. Armitage, on the other hand, was discredited. Iain Macleod saw Armitage as an obstacle to rapid constitutional advancement, and he was advised to go on leave pending retirement in August 1960. Glyn Smallwood Jones became acting Governor until Armitage retired in April 1961.

== Sources ==
- C Baker, (1993). Seeds of Trouble: Government Policy and Land Rights in Nyasaland, 1946–1964, London, British Academic Press.
- C Baker, (1997). State of Emergency: Nyasaland 1959, I.B.Tauris. ISBN 1-86064-068-0.
- C Baker, (1997). Nyasaland, 1959: A Police State? The Society of Malawi Journal, Vol. 50, No. 2.
- C Baker, (1998). Retreat from Empire: Sir Robert Armitage in Africa and Cyprus, I. B. Tauris. ISBN 978-1-86064-223-4.
- C Baker, (2000). Sir Glyn Jones: a proconsul in Africa, I.B.Tauris. ISBN 1-86064-461-9.
- C Baker, (2007). The Mechanics of Rebuttal: The British and Nyasaland Governments' Response to The Devlin Report, 1959, The Society of Malawi Journal, Vol. 60, No. 2.
- Hansard, House of Commons, (1959). Nyasaland (Report of Commission of Inquiry) Debate 28 July 1959 Vol. 610 Columns 317-449.
- A Horne, (2008) Macmillan: The Official Biography, Pan Macmillan. ISBN 0-230-73881-8.
- J McCracken, (2012). A History of Malawi, 1859–1966, Woodbridge, James Currey. ISBN 978-1-84701-050-6.
- B Pachai (1973) Land Policies in Malawi: An Examination of the Colonial Legacy, The Journal of African History, Vol. 14, No. 4.
- B. Pachai, (1978). Land and Politics in Malawi 1875–1975, Kingston (Ontario), The Limestone Press.
- R Palmer, (1986). Working Conditions and Worker Responses on the Nyasaland Tea Estates, 1930–1953, Journal of African History, Vol. 27, No. 1.
- C Parkinson, (2007) Bills of Rights and Decolonization: The Emergence of Domestic Human Rights Instruments in Britain's Overseas Territories, Oxford University Press ISBN 0-19-923193-1.
- J G Pike, (1969). Malawi: A Political and Economic History, London, Pall Mall Press.
- A C Ross, (2009). Colonialism to cabinet crisis: a political history of Malawi, African Books Collective. ISBN 978-99908-87-75-4.
- R. I. Rotberg, (1965). The Rise of Nationalism in Central Africa: The Making of Malawi and Zambia, 1873–1964, Cambridge (Mass), Harvard University Press.
- S Tenney and N K Humphreys, (2011). Historical Dictionary of the International Monetary Fund, Toronto, Scarecrow Press. ISBN 978-0-8108-7531-9.
