= Charles Matinga =

Charles Jameson Matinga, MBE

President of the Nyasaland African Congress
- In office January 1945 – January 1950
- Preceded by: Levi Zililo Mumba
- Succeeded by: James Chinyama

Charles Jameson Matinga MBE was a politician in Nyasaland before the colony obtained independence from the British.

He was elected President-General of the Nyasaland African Congress in 1945, after the death of Levi Zililo Mumba.

In 1950, he was thrown out of office. Later he formed a pro-government party. After Malawi achieved independence in 1964, he was forced into exile.

== Background ==
Charles Matinga had a long career in the civil service, based in Blantyre, and ran a brick-making business on the side. He was a member of the Free Church of Scotland Mission and an active member of the Blantyre Native Association. In a 1943 speech, Matinga praised the earlier missionaries who had come to the country before 1914 and worked to help Africans advance, but said that later arrivals had brought racist ideas and prejudices and had failed to promote African interests. He also strongly criticised the administration for failing to meet African demands for advancement. However, he continued to believe in working within the system to improve it rather than in rebellion against the system.

== NAC leader ==
Africans had been represented in the Protectorate of Nyasaland by the Native Administration of chiefs and headmen, and by local Native Associations. The Nyasaland African Congress (NAC), formed in 1943/1944 was the first organization that attempted to work at a national level. Charles Matinga was elected first vice-president of the Congress at the first general meeting in October 1944, with Levi Mumba being elected president-general. Charles Wesley Mlanga, editor of the Blantyre newspaper Zo-Ona, was elected secretary general and James Dixon Phiri, a clerk in the Public Works Department, was elected assistant secretary-general. When Mumba died in January 1945, Matinga was elected to succeed him as president, with the Reverend Charles Chinula as vice-president. Matinga surprised the government by raising the issue of land grievances, and demanding African majority representation on the Legislative Council and other administrative bodies.

Dr. Hastings Banda, who had a practice in London at the time, was a supporter of Congress. Banda wrote to Matinga in March 1945 saying that he would support the Congress in England by giving lectures and talking to influential people whom he knew such as Sir Arthur Creech Jones and Rita Hinden. He asked that Matinga keep him informed of events in Nyasaland so they could work together to the common goal. However, according to Banda, Matinga was determined to go his own way and even refused an offer by Banda to pay for a permanent organizer for the Congress. Possible Matinga saw Banda as a potential rival.

In the 1930s the concept of a Federation of the colonies of Southern Rhodesia, Northern Rhodesia and Nyasaland had been proposed, and the idea gained increased support in the 1940s among the colonial administrators. This was seen as a betrayal by NAC leaders such as Matinga and James Frederick Sangala, who thought the Colonial Office was discarding the principle that African interests were paramount, instead favoring White colonists. After federation was discussed in more detail at the second Victoria Falls conference in 1949, Matinga wrote Banda in London asking for support in fighting federalism.

The NAC decided to send a delegation to London to meet the colonial secretary and discuss provisions for educating Africans in Nyasaland, and by May 1947 had raised enough funds to send two members, Matinga and the vice-president Charles Chinula. In London they would be joined by Hastings Banda. In November 1947 they were told that the secretary of state would receive them. Matinga left for Cape Town to take the ship to the United Kingdom, but took the secretary general of Congress, Andrew Mponda, rather than Chinula.

The party met with Arthur Creech Jones, now the Labour Party's secretary of state, and gained agreement on the importance of secondary education. This led to establishment of a new secondary school at Dedza in 1951. It was also agreed to establish a teachers training college as Domasi.

Matinga's action in taking his protégé Mponda with him rather than Chinula caused widespread anger among the NAC members, compounded by accusations that Matinga had misused NAC funds on the trip, and by Matinga's failure to attend NAC meetings and report on the trip after he had returned. Sangala managed to prevent police action regarding the funds. But Matinga did not report to Congress until the spring of 1949, and then gave only a verbal summary. When the delegates asked for a full written report, Matinga walked out. The NAC was no longer an effective organization.

Under pressure from Congress delegates, Sangala (who had been one of the original prime movers in organizing the NAC), called a conference on 1 January 1950. Matinga surprised everyone by attending and chairing the first session of the meeting. However, the meeting resolved to dismiss him for abuse of funds. Sangala was forced into desperate efforts to recreate the Congress, arranging a session in August 1950 at which he was elected Vice President and James Chinyama became president.

== Later career ==
The Federation of Rhodesia and Nyasaland became a reality in 1953, against strong opposition from NAC members, some of whom were arrested.

Charles Matinga, Andrew Mponda and Orton Ching'oli Chirwa formed the Nyasaland Progressive Association, dedicated to working within the new reality of the Federation. Matinga became a Federal Member of Parliament.

In 1957 and early 1958 the governor of Nyasaland, Sir Robert Armitage, was attempting to formulate a view of how to evolve the government of the protectorate which he could present to the Colonial Office when he went on leave to London.

In September he met with T.D.T. Banda and other NAC leaders who were pushing for an elected legislative council composed primarily of Africans. He met Charles Matinga's Progressive Party on 20 February 1958, and sensed that they did not feel Africans were ready to run the government, but wanted nominated representatives to work with the government. He summarised the views of Matinga's party as: "In other words they wanted a lot of friendly Africans and Europeans to collaborate with friendly officials. But, of course, politics cannot be this easily organized".

In July 1962, along with J. R. N. Chinyama and Pemba Ndovi, Matinga formed the Convention African National Union (CANU), a rival party to the dominant Malawi Congress Party. CANU called for an end to "one man, one party, one leader in Nyasaland" .

After independence in 1964, people felt bitterly about men such as Matinga who they felt were traitors for having supported the colonial rulers during the struggle for independence.

Matinga left Malawi and settled in Southern Rhodesia.

In 1973, the exiled "Capricorns" who had sided with white-led pro-federation parties - Matinga, Matthews Phiri and Manoah Chirwa - asked President Hastings Banda to be allowed to return to Malawi. Banda asked delegates at the annual MCP convention what they thought about the request. However, he became furious with some who proposed allowing their return, and accused them of sympathy with rebels.
