= Naisi =

Community in Malawi

Coordinates: 15.369115°S 35.344391°E

Naisi (or Old Naisi) is a community in the Southern Region of Malawi, now in effect a northern suburb of the city of Zomba. The community lies below the Zomba Massif to the north, which may be accessed via a rough road. Naisi is the birthplace of James Frederick Sangala, one of the founders of the Nyasaland African Congress.
