= North Nyasa Native Association =

First native association in Nyasaland (1912)

- Successor: Nyasaland African Congress
- Formation: 1912
- Founder: Levi Zililo Mumba and other educated Africans
- Type: Political and welfare organisation
- Headquarters: North Nyasa, Nyasaland (present-day Malawi)
- Region served: Northern Province of Nyasaland
- Official language: Chitumbuka, Chichewa, English
- Secretary: Levi Zililo Mumba (first secretary)
- Key people: James Frederick Sangala
- Parent organization: Native Associations movement

North Nyasa Native Association (NNNA) was the first indigenous political and welfare organisation established in the British protectorate of Nyasaland (present-day Malawi). It was founded in 1912 by a group of mission-educated Africans with the aim of promoting the social, political and economic interests of Africans under colonial rule. The organization had 3 official languages; Chitumbuka (Tumbuka), Chewa and English.

== History ==
The North Nyasa Native Association was established in 1912 in the northern Nyasaland, becoming the earliest example of the native associations that later spread across the territory. Among its founding leaders was Levi Zililo Mumba, who was elected the association’s first secretary.

The association drew much of its membership from mission-educated Africans, including teachers, civil servants, and church leaders. Unlike chiefly authorities, it claimed to represent public opinion in a modern, educated sense. The NNNA’s approach relied on petitioning and dialogue with colonial officials rather than confrontation.

== Objectives and activities ==
The NNNA sought to improve welfare and opportunities for Africans in education, agriculture and access to land. It also provided a forum for debate among the educated about colonial policies. Leaders encouraged unity and discouraged tribal or sectional divisions, instead working towards a regional identity that could speak with one voice to the government.

In 1924, Mumba gave an address on the role of native associations, stating that they existed to improve conditions and to represent Africans more effectively than traditional chiefs. He also urged that local associations should unite in a national body.

== Legacy ==
The NNNA inspired the creation of other associations, such as the West Nyasa Native Association (1914), the Mombera Native Association (1920), and the Southern Province Native Association (1923).

In the 1940s, the various regional associations came together to form the Nyasaland African Congress, which became the principal nationalist movement in the struggle for independence. The NNNA is therefore regarded as the starting point of Malawi’s organised nationalist politics.

== See also ==
- Nyasaland African Congress
- Levi Zililo Mumba
- James Frederick Sangala
