= Operation Sunrise (Nyasaland) =

Date	3–5 March 1959
Location	Nyasaland, Federation of Rhodesia and Nyasaland
Result	British/Rhodesian-Nyasaland victory: Leading Nyasaland African Congress members arrested.; Nyasaland African Congress suppressed.

Belligerents
British Empire: Federation of Rhodesia and Nyasaland	Nyasaland African Congress

Commanders and leaders
(United Kingdom) Sir Robert Armitage (Federation of Rhodesia and Nyasaland) Sir Roy Welensky	Hastings Banda; Henry Chipembere; Kanyama Chiume; Dunduzu Chisiza; Yatuta Chisiza

Units involved
(United Kingdom) King's African Rifles Rhodesia and Nyasaland: (Federation of Rhodesia and Nyasaland) Federal Army; Royal Rhodesia Regiment; Rhodesian African Rifles; Nyasaland; Police Mobile Force; Special Branch	Unknown

Strength
4,500 troops and police (1,000 troops from Southern Rhodesia)	Unknown

Casualties and losses
None	21 civilians killed 29 injured 263 arrested

Operation Sunrise was the name given to a police and military action conducted by the authorities in the Central African protectorate of Nyasaland (now known as Malawi) which started on 3 March 1959, initially to detain and intern 350 individuals who were considered a potential threat to law and order in anticipation of the declaration of a State of Emergency. Although it is sometimes considered to involve only the incidents of 3 March, the Devlin Commission report is clear that it was one of two distinct operations by the security forces, reinforced from outside Nyasaland, involving the arrest and detention members of the Nyasaland African Congress. It involved not only those members of Congress initially arrested, but others arrested and detained without trial in the course of the emergency. The operation was described in some detail in the Devlin Commission report (Colonial Office Report of the Nyasaland Commission of Inquiry, HMSO, London, 1959) and that account has been amplified by Colonial Office documents not made available to the Devlin Commission.

== Background ==
There had been some sporadic unrest in Nyasaland in the early 1950s, most recently in 1953 when unrest among African tenants of the British Central Africa Company led to the "Cholo riots", and after Nyasaland was forced into the Federation of Rhodesia and Nyasaland with Northern and Southern Rhodesia (now Zambia and Zimbabwe, respectively) against the wishes of the Nyasaland people, by a campaign of non-violent resistance initiated by the Nyasaland African Congress (NAC). The Cholo riots were more serious: attempts by the British Central Africa Company to increase the rents of tenants, and evict those who resisted this, led to many local people in the Cholo (now Thyolo) District refusing to pay taxes or attend courts, and to riots breaking in August 1953, resulting in eleven dead and seventy-two injured.

However the NAC campaign against Federation was abandoned in early 1954 and the party lost much of its support and, following the Cholo riots, the Nyasaland government agreed to purchase land in Cholo District from the company for resettlement. The protectorate was relatively quiet until, in early 1957, the Nyasaland African Congress revived under a number of young activists, including Henry Chipembere, Kanyama Chiume and the brothers Dunduzu Chisiza and Yatuta Chisiza, who organised Congress as a mass political party and created support for Hastings Banda, a long-term expatriate who had campaigned against Federation, to return to Nyasaland as party leader. The activities of these young activists as they toured the protectorate led to unrest including demonstrations and the intimidation of opponents.

On 6 July 1958, Hastings Banda returned to Nyasaland at the invitation of the activists to lead a movement against Federation and towards independence. Banda, together with some of these lieutenants, toured the country rousing support and the disturbances continued. At the end of 1958, Banda and other NAC leaders attended an All-African People's Conference in Accra, in recently-independent Ghana, and they returned to Nyasaland determined to press for constitutional change. When the Federation of Rhodesia and Nyasaland was set up in 1953, provision had been made for the Federal constitution to be reviewed in 1960, including a review of which territories it would include, and Banda wanted to ensure African, and hopefully Congress, majorities on the Nyasaland bodies that would take part in this review. However, when Banda presented the Congress proposals to the governor, Sir Robert Armitage that would have led to withdrawal from the Federation, Armitage refused to accept them, although Banda continued discussions with the governor and leading officials on proposed constitutional changes.

When talks ended in stalemate at the start of January 1959, Chipembere and Chiume led calls to intensify the protest campaign. Their programme proposed disobedience to colonial laws and demonstrations which would lead to arrests, to be followed by protests in favour of those arrested and further arrests of protesters, and the intimidation of, and sometimes assaults on, police and government workers trying to enforce the laws, in an escalatory cycle designed to cause chaos. The disturbances particularly affected four heavily populated districts in the south of the protectorate, including the two largest towns and, by mid-February, Armitage considered that the situation was serious enough to prepare for a State of Emergency throughout Nyasaland.

The authorities' concerns were bolstered by reports from several police informers, only one of which was actually present at the clandestine Congress meeting on the night of 24–25 January to discuss the possible action to be taken if Banda were arrested. It seems probable that this discussion including loose talk about attacking Europeans, and that this was the basis for the claim made by the Head of Special Branch of a plan for the indiscriminate killing of Europeans, Asians and Africans opposed to Congress, the so-called "murder plot". The Nyasaland government took no immediate action against Banda, and continued to negotiate with him, and the governor also made no specific reference to the "murder plot" until after his declaration of a State of Emergency. The Devlin Commission strongly criticised talk of the "murder plot", which it said did not exist, and the use made of this claim trying to justify the Emergency.

Armitage's preparations for a State of Emergency were made in February 1959, and included requests for police reinforcements from other British dependencies. He consulted the Federal Prime Minister Roy Welensky and the Southern Rhodesia Premier and, with the approval of the Colonial Office, over 1,000 troops were sent to Nyasaland from Southern Rhodesia, including European troops of the Royal Rhodesia Regiment and African troops of the Rhodesia African Rifles. In the days immediately following, the arrival of Rhodesian troops police or troops opened fire on rioters in several places, leading to four deaths.

The plans for Operation Sunrise, the first stage in the overall two-stage stabilisation operation, were prepared by the Nyasaland Operations Committee on 27 February 1959. Special Branch had been keeping lists of potential detainees since at least 1954, and the latest revision, made in November 1958, contained 617 names.

A State of Emergency was declared at midnight on 2–3 March 1959. In a broadcast at 7am on 3 March the governor, Sir Robert Armitage, explained his decision as follows:

" I have taken this step because of the action of the leaders of the Nyasaland African Congress. It has day by day become increasingly apparent that they are bent on pursuing a course of violence, intimidation and disregard of lawful authority . . . . Under emergency powers the principal organisers of the campaign of violence and unlawful demonstrations are being arrested and will be detained "

== The Operation ==
Operation Sunrise was the first step taken after the declaration of the Emergency and was so named because its mission was to detain, at or just before dawn, 350 people who had been identified by police special branch as "hard core" or militant members of the native population. A quota of police and military personnel was designated for each province and district in the protectorate. Each of the 350 individual pick-up operations was to be made by a separate team consisting of about six men (which was taken by the Devlin Commission to mean that they were prepared for violence). The teams were also directed, of circumstances permitted, to search the detainee's house for documents.

Because of the potential for violence after the arrests, the authorities decided that most of the detainees should be imprisoned outside of Nyasaland. Accordingly, many detainees were taken immediately to temporary prisons erected at Chileka Airport in the south and Lilongwe Airport in the Central Province, in preparation for airlifting to Bulawayo in Southern Rhodesia where they were to be interned in Khami Prison. In the Northern Province, there were ultimately 75 detainees, who were taken from Nkhata Bay on Lake Nyasa in the motor vessel m.v. Mpasa to Chipoka (although, because of unanticipated events, the vessel didn't arrive there until 6 March), whence they went by rail to Salima and by road to Lilongwe Airport (with the exception of 12 who were sent on by rail to Limbe).

The procedure for the detention of Banda was more elaborate. The force consisted of six groups: A Police Mobile Force (PMF) platoon, a supporting platoon from the King's African Rifles, a diversion group under a police inspector, a "snatch party" of six men also under a police inspector, an escort group of three special constables (civilian volunteers), and a search group of two Special Branch (internal security) personnel. Banda's house was situated off the road between Limbe and Blantyre. At 4:35am, led by the diversion party, the Land Rovers coasted down hill towards the house with their lights extinguished. The diversion group arrived via the back roadway and rushed the servants' quarters at the back of the house in order to divert attention away from the main house. Having arrested the occupants they tear-gassed the interior to make sure there was nobody still hiding within.

The PMF assault group, meanwhile, stormed the main house. There were about 60 men sleeping in the surrounding yard – it had been anticipated for some time that Banda might be arrested – who immediately fled, leaving behind an armory of two bows and arrows, four catapults (slingshots, in American parlance), one spear, twelve batons and knobkerries, three axes and some iron bars. Although the Banda supporters had apparently planned to beat a drum to alert the general populace – who would relay the news with more drums – in the event of his arrest, the drum was never beaten.

The assault group tried to force the front door with an axe, to no effect. As it happened, the door was not locked. Banda's bodyguard, Yatuta Chisiza, who had been lying on a sofa in the front room, led the group to Banda's bedroom. Banda, in his pyjamas, was allowed to put on a dressing gown (housecoat) and taken to a waiting Land Rover. He was also permitted to take a suit of clothes (but not, by some oversight, underwear). He was driven immediately to Chileka Airport, barely avoiding a potentially fatal collision with an oncoming Saracen armored vehicle on the narrow road, and shortly afterwards flown to Gwelo (now Gweru) in Southern Rhodesia with one of his lieutenants, Henry Chipembere who had been detained by chance on the Chileka Airport road.

The numbers detained in Operation Sunrise on the 3 March 1959 were 22 dissidents by 6am, 60 dissidents by 10am, 90 dissidents by 1:30pm, and 120 dissidents by 5pm. By 9pm on the following day, 4 March, 130 dissidents had been arrested and 44 dissidents more detained on "28-day orders" (limited-duration detention/review). By 5 March, 263 dissidents had been arrested, some having given themselves up voluntarily, with a further 87 dissidents on the list remaining at large. Some of the detainees were released immediately. All but a few high-level remaining were first detained at Khami. Banda, Chipembere, F.W.K. (Kaphombe) Nyasulu, and Dunduzu Chisiza were interned at Gwelo (later to be joined by Dunduzu's brother, Yatuta, who was initially sent to Khami).

Further arrests took place during the course of the emergency, and by 18 July there were 381 dissidents held in Nyasaland, and 125 dissidents in Southern Rhodesia, as well as 18 persons held under 28-day orders: by then, 1,163 detention orders in total had been made. By 1 November 1959 the number had risen to 1,328. Many of the detainees were soon released; by 1 November 1959, 830 dissidents had been released.

Although most of the arrests were carried out without lethal force or excessive violence, five injuries in cases where resistance was allegedly offered. More significantly, in two incidents involving demonstrations by crowds against the arrests, at least 21 people were killed and 29 injured.

Of those killed, 20 were demonstrators at Nkhata Bay, where those detained in the Northern Region were being held before being transferred by steamer to the south. A local Congress leader who had not been arrested encouraged a large crowd to gather at the dockside, apparently to secure the release of the detainees. Only a few troops had arrived by ship, as those who should have arrived by road early on 3 March were delayed. Before these arrived, the district commissioner felt the situation was beyond the control of the few soldiers available, and he ordered then to open fire when the crowd refused to disperse after he had declared a riot. The other death the occurred on 3 March was in Blantyre.

Operation Sunrise was the first stage of Armitage's plan for the Emergency, to be followed by rounding up and detaining of any Congress leaders still at large. Those detainees who had been wrongly detained or were minor Congress members who Armitage considered had not engaged in violence were to be released swiftly, although he generally showed reluctance to release more prominent leaders. However, the 225 detainees released in March 1959 and 275 in April included many detained after the first days of Operation Sunrise, an indication of how far Armitage's aim of returning to normal quickly had not been realised.

=== The Nkhata Bay shootings ===
The town of Nkhata Bay was, and still is, a district headquarters. The district commissioner in 1959, John Brock, believed that, by the standards of the time, he enjoyed good relations with the local people, which he was unwilling to jeopardise by bringing in troops earlier than he thought necessary. However, he had received secret instructions that Operation Sunrise on 3 March would involve the arrest of detainees from his district at dawn and their lodgement in the town prison until a motor vessel, M.V. Mpasa, arrived at 6.30 am. Those detainees were to be sent on board under guard, the Mpasa was to sail on to Karonga at the northern end of the lake to receive detainees from that district, before returning to Nkhata Bay to pick up a further group of detainees, arrested at dawn in Mzimba district, and brought by road from Mzimba town, about 120 miles from Nkhata Bay. The ship would then take all those arrested to the railway terminus at Chipoka, further south on the lake.

The District Commissioner subsequently told the Devlin Commission that he had been advised of the "murder plot" and, although Brock thought it was only a wild idea, he took action to protect the local European residents in Nkhata Bay. This was the one clear example that rumours of this plot had an effect on events. The small local police force had already been reinforced by a police Inspector and 14 constables, and by 11 soldiers of the Kings African Rifles (KAR) but, anticipating trouble when the Operation Sunrise arrests were made, the Major in charge of the army base at Mzimba had been ordered to leave there at 1am with two platoons of white soldiers of the Royal Rhodesia Regiment (RRR), to arrive at Nkhata Bay around 9am. However, his men had only reached Mzimba late the previous day, so he delayed their departure In addition, a sergeant and 11 privates from the RRR were on board the Mpasa

At around 6.30 am, the Mpasa arrived and the prisoners that had already been detained were taken to the dock area. The fenced dock area included a wharf and floating jetty where vessels tied-up, with a narrow approach road, widening near the wharf. A crowd began to gather at the prison, and a local Congress leader who had not been arrested, encouraged them to attempt to secure the release of the detainees, unaware that they were already on the Mpasa. The Royal Rhodesia Regiment sergeant, van Oppen, decided to send six of his men ashore to reinforce the police and KAR at the prison. The district commissioner attempted to get the crowd to disperse, telling them of the State of Emergency, and when that failed, tried to establish by telephone when the troops from Mzimba would arrive. By 8.30 am they had not even reached Mzuzu, about 50 miles from Nkhata Bay, and did not arrive until 3 pm A small detachment of KAR soldiers at Mzuzu was therefore immediately sent to Nkhata Bay, and it arrived about noon. Brock, the district commissioner, was left in the very difficult position of controlling a large, angry crowd with few police and troops on hand, with adequate reinforcements a significant distance away.

Once the crowd realised that the prisoners were on the Mpasa, it went toward the dock area. The police, KAR soldiers and the six RRR privates at the prison were thereafter left in peace. The district commissioner had tried to order the Mpasa to leave, but was either prevented by the crowd from doing so, or by the RRR sergeant on board, who refused to leave six of his men behind. Leaving one soldier on board, his remaining four soldiers with fixed bayonets on their rifles and van Oppen with a Sten gun at first held the entrance to the dock area against about a thousand men and women. Sergeant van Oppen was subsequently awarded the British Empire Medal on the recommendation of Roy Welensky, the Federal Prime Minister.

The crowd was unarmed but hostile and pressed against the five soldiers, slowly forcing them back along the narrow road toward the ship for almost two hours. The troops were not physically assaulted and the District Commissioner managed to join them, but there was much jeering and spitting. Initially, the District Commissioner refused the RRR sergeant's plea to disperse the crowd by firing limited number of shots at them, as his aim was to avoid bloodshed until the promised reinforcements arrived. By about 11.30 am, when no further troops had arrived, and the five soldiers had retreated to a point beyond which they could be easily surrounded, he read the Riot Act and, when the crowd did not disperse, handed over his powers to the military. After twice pointing their rifles at the crowd without firing, the five soldiers including the sergeant opened fire on the crowd, and were recorded as killing or fatally wounding 20 protesters and injuring at least 28 more. According to the Devlin Report, a total of 27 shots was fired, 18 from the soldier's rifles and 9 from the sergeant's Sten gun. Subsequent enquiries established that eight of those initially recorded as wounded but not fatally so later died of their wounds. The confrontation and shooting was already over by noon when the KAR soldiers from Mzuzu arrived.

Although Alan Lennox-Boyd, the colonial secretary, argued in Cabinet that it might have been possible to fire over the heads of the crowd in the first instance to avoid casualties, and although the Devlin thought that the deaths could have been avoided, had the Mpasa sailed as soon as the crowd were seen to approach the dock area, the commission accepted that the district commissioner had the legal authority to order the soldiers to open fire, and that in retrospect it was the correct and the only thing to do when facing off against such a hostile crowd.

== Aftermath ==
The Nyasaland government directed two operations against what had been, until just after midnight on 2 March, a lawful political party with whose leader, Dr Banda, the government had been negotiating. Both operations produced hostile and sometimes violent reactions. The initial reaction of many Congress supporters to Operation Sunrise was rioting, damage to government and European property and strikes, and there were five more deaths in Machinga District up to 19 March when soldiers of the Royal Rhodesia Regiment or Kings African Rifles were ordered to open fire on rioters. However, after a short period, following action by the police and troops, the Southern Region was calm but tense and the strikers returned to work. There were another further six deaths of rioters shot in the Northern Region in March. The Nyasaland Police, which participated in Operation Sunrise, particularly the paramilitary Police Mobile Force, were routinely armed and lived segregated lives in the police lines, alien to most other Africans.

In the Northern Region, the destruction of bridges and government buildings and rural resistance, including attacks on conservation schemes, continued for several months, particularly in the Misuku Hills, a remote area of rural Congress radicalism close to the border with Tanganyika Territory and the remainder of the 51 officially recorded deaths were in military operations in the Northern Region. These deaths occurred in the second operation, which had no code name, and involved what the governor described as a "campaign of harassment" involving "tough and punitive" operations by the military in disaffected areas, to restore governmental authority. Soldiers rather than police conducted these operations, which were reinforced by the imposition of collective fines, and by arrests of suspected members of Congress under 28 day orders or under normal police powers, and their being charged with criminal offences. By 1 November 1959, 1,040 had been convicted of criminal offences and 840 acquitted. Allegations of brutality were later considered by the Devlin Commission. It rejected claim of rape and torture made against Federation troops in the Misuku Hills, but it upheld other complaints, including the burning of houses, the imposition of arbitrary fines and beatings, which it considered illegal.

Operation Sunrise was the first stage of Armitage's plan for the Emergency. His plan for the next stage envisaged encouraging moderate, non-Congress, African leaders to come forward, issuing pro-government, anti-Congress propaganda and making what he hoped would be firm but friendly displays of police and military force. Once a firm military presence had demonstrated the futility of resistance, he considered that troops from the Rhodesias could be withdrawn by stages. Those detainees who had been wrongly detained or were minor Congress members who had not engaged in violence could be released swiftly, although many more continued to be detained well after the start Operation Sunrise.

Armitage had no plans to resolve the political crisis in Nyasaland, other than the elimination of Banda and Congress and, from March 1959 he repeatedly sought Colonial Office approval to introduce legislation either to ban Banda from returning to Nyasaland after his detention or to extend his detention (in Rhodesia or Nyasaland) indefinitely. He was also unwilling to release most of the detainees. Those African politicians that had put themselves forward as moderate alternatives to Banda were, Armitage admitted, not credible and without influence. Armitage hoped that Orton Chirwa, who had been released from detention in August and became first president of the Malawi Congress Party, the successor to the banned Nyasaland African Congress, would be willing to negotiate, but Chirwa said that only Banda had the authority to do so. By December 1959, the new colonial secretary, Iain Macleod, insisted that the vast majority of detainees should be released quickly, including Banda but not Chipembere, Chiume or the Chisiza brothers and others labelled as extremists. Armitage was generally resistant to releasing detainees to reduce numbers, and his cautious insistence on a detailed review of each case and saying in July 1959 he could not envisage releasing a hard core of 49 detainees caused tension with Macleod. In January 1960, Armitage also asked for extra troops to be sent from Southern Rhodesia when Banda was due to be released, reinforcements that Macleod declined to authorise.

Banda was released on 1 February 1960 and the State of Emergency ended on 16 June 1960. Armitage was by now discredited and was seen by Macleod, who had instructed him in May 1960 to arrange for rapid constitutional advancement as an obstacle to progress. In August 1960, Macleod advised Armitage to go on leave pending his retirement, and he retired in April 1961 without returning to Nyasaland. During the 16 months of the State of Emergency, up to 4,500 police and soldiers, the majority not from Nyasaland, patrolled the protectorate. In all, 1,339 people were detailed without trial and 2,160 were convicted.

== See also ==
- Rhodesian Bush War
- South African Border War
- Chilembwe uprising

== Sources ==
- Colonial Office Report of the Nyasaland Commission of Enquiry, HMSO, London, 1959
- Baker, Colin (1993). Seeds of Trouble: Government Policy and Land Rights in Nyasaland, 1946–1964, London, British Academic Press. ISBN 978-1-85043-615-7
- Baker, Colin, (1996) Dr. Banda's Arrest and Release from Detention, 1959–1960. The Society of Malawi Journal, Vol. 49, No. 3 (1996), pp. 1–14
- Baker, Colin, (1997) State of Emergency: Crisis in Central Africa, Nyasaland 1959 - 1960, London, I.B. Tauris. ISBN 1-86064-068-0.
- Baker, Colin, (1998) Retreat from Empire: Sir Robert Armitage in Africa and Cyprus, I. B. Tauris. ISBN 978-1-86064-223-4.
- Baker, Colin, (2007). The Mechanics of Rebuttal: The British and Nyasaland Governments' Response to The Devlin Report, 1959, The Society of Malawi Journal, Vol. 60, No. 2, pp. 28–47.
- Brock, John, (2014). District Commissioner John Brock's Personal Account of the Events at Nkhata Bay on 3 March 1959, The Society of Malawi Journal, Vol. 67, No. 2, pp. 13–18.
- McCracken, John (1992). Authority and Legitimacy in Malawi: policing and politics in a colonial state, in D. Anderson and D. Killingray (editors), Policing and Decolonisation: Politics, Nationalism, and the Police, 1917–65, Manchester University Press. ISBN 0-71903-033-1.
- McCracken, John (2012). A History of Malawi, 1859–1966, Woodbridge, James Currey. ISBN 978-1-84701-050-6.
- Palmer, Robin (1986). Working Conditions and Worker Responses on the Nyasaland Tea Estates, 1930–1953, pp. 122–3, 125.The Journal of African History, Vol. 27 No.1 pp. 105–126
- Pike, John G. (1969). Malawi: A Political and Economic History, London, Pall Mall Press.
- Ransford, Oliver, (1967). Livingstone's Lake, New York, Thomas Y. Cromwell Company
- Rotberg, Robert I. (1965). The Rise of Nationalism in Central Africa: The Making of Malawi and Zambia, 1873–1964, Cambridge (Mass), Harvard University Press.
- Simpson, Brian, (2002). The Devlin Commission (1959): Colonialism, Emergencies, and the Rule of Law, Oxford Journal of Legal Studies, Vol. 22, No. 1, pp. 17–52.
