= Robert Perceval Armitage =

British colonial administrator (1906–1990)

Sir Robert Armitage KCMG
- Sir Robert Armitage KCMG

Governor of Nyasaland
- In office 10 April 1956 – 10 April 1961
- Monarch: Elizabeth II
- Preceded by: Sir Geoffrey Colby
- Succeeded by: Sir Glyn Jones

Governor of Cyprus
- In office February 1954 – 25 September 1955
- Monarch: Elizabeth II
- Preceded by: Andrew Barkworth Wright
- Succeeded by: John Alan Francis Harding

Personal details
- Born: 21 December 1906
- Died: 7 June 1990 (aged 83)
- Education: Winchester College

Sir Robert Perceval Armitage KCMG (21 December 1906 – 7 June 1990) was a British colonial administrator who held senior positions in Kenya and the Gold Coast, and was Governor of Cyprus and then of Nyasaland during the period of decolonisation.

== Early years ==
Armitage was born on 21 December 1906 in Nungambakkam, Madras, the first child of Frank and Muriel Armitage. His father was commissioner of police in Madras city. At the age of ten he was sent to Highfield School at Liphook, Hampshire, where he was captain of the cricket team in his final year. From 1920 to 1925 he attended Winchester College. He became a district and secretariat officer in Kenya.

Armitage married Gwladys Lyona Meyler (b. 2 May 1906, Natal) on 18 February 1930 in Highlands Cathedral, Nairobi, Kenya. Their children were Robert Jeremy, born on 16 June 1932 in Poole, Dorset, England and Richard Hugh Lyon, born on 30 May 1937 in Canford Cliffs, Dorset, England.

== Gold Coast ==
In July 1948, Armitage was financial secretary of the Gold Coast. After the governor had said he was willing to consider the creation of an agricultural bank, Armitage said his government was "deeply committed in principle" to taking action and "would find it difficult to retreat". In 1949, Armitage was chairman of a committee to consider establishing a national bank. He tried to dampen nationalist demands by ruling out the idea of a Reserve Bank, but did not succeed.

By 1950, Armitage was Minister of Finance of the Gold Coast. At the end of 1950 the colonial government proposed to increase export duties on cocoa. The world price for the crop was rising, and the government felt that the planters would waste increased profits on luxuries, while the government would use it for development plans. Armitage was prepared to face opposition from cocoa producers, but prayed for five years of rising world prices to solve all economic problems. Armitage recommended appointment of a first-rate economic expert to manage the economy during the cocoa boom. He said the country "is rapidly moving out of the extremely restricted economy of the years before the war and so the holder should be someone who has experience of financial and economic matters, at least in other parts of Africa and possibly experience from other parts of the world".

In his budget speech in 1953, Armitage explained the policy he had followed: "(Sterling) balances have accrued ... largely because the raw materials produced in the Gold Coast, mainly cocoa, have brought in large earnings and the Government ... increased taxation partly in an endeavor to lessen the amount of money which would exert an inflationary pressure ... and partly to build reserves." Armitage did not mention that the project to build the Akosombo Dam over the Volta River was starting to seem feasible, and funds would be needed for that purpose. The Gold Coast gained independence in 1957 as Ghana.

== Cyprus ==
Armitage was Governor of Cyprus from February 1954 until 25 September 1955. At the time of his appointment there was growing agitation by the Greek Cypriots for enosis, or union with Greece, although this was opposed by the Turkish Cypriots. The Greek government supported the movement, but the British did not want to give up an important base in the eastern Mediterranean. Few of the Greek Cypriots were willing to compromise. In September 1954, Armitage said that the self-styled moderates had "no organisation, no party, no funds, no agents and they will win nothing".

An attempt was made on Armitage's life on 1 April 1955. Bombs exploded all over the island on that day as EOKA insurgents opened a violent campaign for self-determination. Armitage asked for permission to declare a state of emergency in July 1955, in response to the EOKA insurrection, but this was not granted. He was nervous of loss of control, wanted to "nip trouble in the bud" by detaining leading members of EOKA and he was allowed to try to detain its more militant members under the Detention of Persons Law of 15 July 1955. For several months Armitage tried to find a way to deport Archbishop Makarios and the Bishop of Kyrenia, both of whom publicly supported union with Greece. Existing laws did not cover the situation of the Archbishop, who advocated a peaceful approach.

A state of emergency was eventually declared, which allowed for deportation without cause. By then, Armitage had been replaced as governor by Field Marshal Lord Harding of Petherton, leaving office in September 1955.

== Nyasaland ==
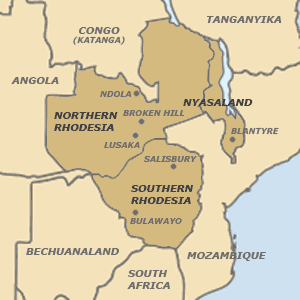
Federation of Rhodesia and Nyasaland

=== Unrest and State of Emergency ===
Armitage arrived in Nyasaland on 9 April 1956 to take over from Geoffrey Colby as Governor. One of the main issues he had to face was the unpopularity of the Federation of Rhodesia and Nyasaland, which had come into being in 1953. He resisted proposals to "federalize" administration of European farming by the creation of a Federal ministry, while leaving African agriculture a responsibility of each of the three territories. He considered that this would result in the diversion of resources away from African agriculture, a serious concern for the indigenous population. He also resisted moves to make the Federation independent. He said that moving too quickly towards the status of a Dominion could "stimulate early and violent African opposition, which would at best discredit Federation and at the worst break it".

In September 1957 he met a delegation from the Nyasaland African Congress headed by its president TDT Banda, who asked for legislative reforms including an elected legislative assembly with most members elected by Africans. He also met representatives of Charles Matinga's Progressive Party, who were seeking to follow a more moderate path, with nominated representatives to work with the government. He summarised the views of Matinga's party as: "In other words they wanted a lot of friendly Africans and Europeans to collaborate with friendly officials. But, of course, politics cannot be this easily organized".

Several of the younger members of the Nyasaland African Congress had little faith in the ability of T D T Banda, who they also accused of dishonesty, and wished to replace him with Dr Hastings Banda (no relation), then living in the Gold Coast. Dr Banda announced he would only return if given the presidency of Congress: after this was agreed he returned to Nyasaland in July 1958 and T D T Banda was ousted. Banda and Congress Party leaders started a campaign of direct action against federation, for immediate constitutional change and eventual independence. As this included resistance to Federal directives on farming practices; protests were widespread and sometimes violent.

In January 1959, Banda presented the Congress proposals for constitutional reform to Armitage. These were for an African majority in the Legislative Council and at least parity with non-Africans in the Executive Council. Armitage rejected these proposals, and this led to demands within Congress for an escalation of anti-government protests and more violent action. On 18 February 1959 there was an attack on the airstrip at Fort Hill by a mob armed with pangas. As Congress supporters became more violent and Congress leaders made increasingly inflammatory statements, Armitage decided against offering concessions, but prepared for mass arrests. Armitage had discussions with Roy Welensky, the Prime Minister of the Federation, Southern Rhodesia officials, and Sir Arthur Benson, the Governor of Northern Rhodesia. These meetings coordinated plans to for mass arrests of members of the nationalist parties of each of the three territories, declaring a State of Emergency in any of them where this was considered necessary, and to send European troops from Southern Rhodesia to Nyasaland.

On 21 February, European troops of the Rhodesia Regiment were flown into Nyasaland and, in the days immediately following, police or troops opened fire on rioters in several places, leading to four deaths. In deciding to make widespread arrests covering almost the whole Congress organisation, Armitage was influenced by a report received by the police from an informer of a meeting of Congress leaders at which, it was claimed by the Head of Special Branch that the indiscriminate killing of Europeans and Asians, and of those Africans opposed to Congress was planned, the so-called "murder plot". There is no evidence that such a plan existed, and the Nyasaland government took no immediate action against Banda or other Congress leaders but continued to negotiate with them until late February.

On 3 March 1959 Sir Robert Armitage, as governor of Nyasaland, declared a State of Emergency over the whole of the protectorate and arrested Dr. Banda, the president of the Nyasaland African Congress, other members of its executive committee and over a hundred local party officials: Congress was banned the next day. Those arrested were detained without trial, and the total number detained for Congress membership finally rose to over 1,300. Over 2,000 more were imprisoned for offences against the Emergency Regulations, including rioting and criminal damage. The stated aim of these measures was to allow the Nyasaland government to restore law and order after the increasing lawlessness following Dr Banda's return. Rather than calming the situation immediately, in the emergency that followed fifty-one Africans were killed and many more were wounded.

=== The Devlin and Armitage reports ===
In the debate in the House of Commons on 3 March 1959, Alan Lennox-Boyd, the Colonial Secretary, stated that it was clear from information received that Congress had planned the widespread murder of Europeans, Asians and moderate Africans, “…in fact, a massacre was being planned" and, later in the same debate, the Minister of State at the Colonial Office, Julian Amery, reinforced what Lennox-Boyd had said with talk of a “…conspiracy of murder" and "a massacre… on a Kenyan scale". It was subsequently difficult for ministers to repudiate these statements.

Harold Macmillan decided to set up a Commission of Inquiry headed by Lord Devlin, which exposed the failings of the Nyasaland administration, and concluded it had lost the support of those it governed. The Devlin Commission's report is the only example of a British judge examining whether the actions of a colonial administration in suppressing dissent were appropriate. Devlin's conclusions that excessive force was used and that Nyasaland was a "police state" caused political uproar. His report was largely rejected and the state of emergency lasted until June 1960. Macmillan not only broadly rejected the Devlin Report, which had taken several months to prepare, but engineered the production of the rival Armitage Report, which was prepared very quickly so it could be released on the same day as the Devlin Report. The Colonial Office obtained an early draft of the Devlin Commission's report and passed a copy to Armitage, which he used to prepare a document attacking its findings. Armitage then joined a high level working party in London which drafted a despatch to counter the Devlin Report.

=== Leaving Nyasaland ===
The Nyasaland African Congress, which had been banned in 1958, was re-formed as the Malawi Congress Party in 1959. Banda's detention became a political issue in the 1959 general election in the United Kingdom, although the Conservatives retained power. Under pressure from the press, the government decided to release Banda in March 1960.

Before Band's release, Armitage was involved in a further controversy. During the visit of Harold Macmillan to Blantyre in January 1960 as part of his African tour, a demonstration led by Malawi Congress Party activists against continued emergency restrictions and the Banda's imprisonment was witnessed by British and other journalists, some of whom reported that the police provoked a riot, which they suppressed with excessive and indiscriminate violence against demonstrators and spectators in which European officers were directly involved. Several British newspapers called for an impartial inquiry into the so-called "Blantyre riot", which Armitage resisted that the journalists had exaggerated, if not invented, claims of police brutality. However, the Colonial Secretary, Ian Macleod agreed under parliamentary pressure to a judge-led inquiry and instructed Armitage to arrange it.

The ensuing Southworth Commission by Justice Frederic Southworth of the Nyasaland High Court was appointed by Armitage to inquire into the disturbances and, in particular into allegations of police brutality, including by two named senior European policeman. It was not mandated to inquire into press coverage. Southworth cleared the Nyasaland police of brutality and heavily criticised British correspondents for distorting events. Southworth's stinging attacks, less on the integrity of the journalists involved than about their personalities and apparent preconceptions about the use of force damaged his claim to be impartial. The British Government was concerned by Southworth's attacks on the press and minimise its adverse impact by having the report published as a Nyasaland Government document, not a British Government one, and by only making a short written parliamentary statement, avoiding any parliamentary debate. The press coverage highlighted to the British public and parliament the strength of African opposition to the Federation of Rhodesia and Nyasaland and the degree of coercion needed to preserve the Federation, and served to discredited Armitage.

Armitage had imprisoned Banda, not realising that he was the only African politician who could negotiate a credible constitution for the protectorate. Devlin's conclusion that there was no murder plot and that Banda was not involved in promoting violence opened the way for the British government to deal with him. Despite Lennox-Boyd's rejection of the Devlin Report, once Iain Macleod replaced him at the Colonial Office late in 1959, Devlin was approached for advice. Armitage, on the other hand, was discredited and he was seen by Macleod as an obstacle to progress. Although Macleod gave Armitage instructions to arrange for rapid constitutional advancement in May 1960, which set the country on the road to one-party rule., he advised Armitage to go on leave pending retirement in August 1960. Glyn Smallwood Jones became acting Governor until Armitage retired in April 1961. Armitage retired without returning to Nyasaland in April 1961.

Armitage died in Amesbury, Wiltshire, England, on 7 June 1990 at the age of 83. He was buried in Bridstow, Herefordshire.
