= James Ralph Nthinda Chinyama =

President of the Nyasaland African Congress
- In office August 1950 – December 1953
- Preceded by: Charles Matinga
- Succeeded by: James Frederick Sangala

James Ralph Nthinda Chinyama was a leading member of the Nyasaland African Congress (NAC) during the period of British colonial rule in Nyasaland, which became the independent state of Malawi in 1964.

== Early years ==
Chinyama was the son of Filipo Chinyama, who had been executed for leading the Ntcheu arm of the 1915 uprising led by John Chilembwe. He became an independent tobacco grower and businessman in the Lilongwe District of the Central Province. In 1927, Chinyama helped George Simeon Mwase to found the Central Province Native Association. By 1933, Chinyama was leader of the Native Association of Lilongwe, which had been formed to represent the views of the indigenous people of the area to the colonial administration. In 1950, Chinyama was president of the African Farmers Association, which represented the interests of the most prosperous farm owners.

== NAC President ==
The Nyasaland African Congress, an umbrella organization for Native Associations launched in 1943, had been struggling due to a dispute with the president, Charles Matinga. In January 1950, Matinga was expelled due to suspected misuse of funds. Chinyama was elected president of the NAC at a meeting in Mzimba in August 1950. James Frederick Sangala was elected vice-president. Chinyama's election marked a turning point in the composition of the Congress, with prosperous farmers and small businessmen taking the place of the civil servants, clergy and teachers who until then had led the movement. After the meeting, Chinyama organized a tour of the Central and Southern provinces to publicize the Congress.

At a conference at Lancaster House in London in April 1952, the newly elected Conservative government together with Godfrey Huggins (prime minister of Southern Rhodesia) and Roy Welensky (future prime minister) as well as representatives of African interests (though it was boycotted by Nyasaland Africans), concluded by publishing a draft constitution for a federation combining Nyasaland with Southern Rhodesia and Northern Rhodesia in a so-called Central African Federation. Chinyama and other Africans were invited to attend, but when they realised the foregone conclusion of the conference they agreed to do so only as observers.

In 1953 the new federation came into being. It was deeply unpopular with NAC members, who saw it as a betrayal of the compact under which the Colonial Office would place the interests of Africans first in Nyasaland. Some of the younger members of the Congress called for radical protests. Chinyama, called at the end of August to Zomba and reminded by Governor Sir Geoffrey Colby of the fate which had befallen his father after the Chilembwe rising of 1915, held back . Rioting and non-cooperation was ruthlessly suppressed, with an official death toll of eleven.

Chinyama publicly condemned the riots, not wanting the NAC to be associated with them. He resigned from his position and was replaced by James Sangala in January 1954.

== Later years ==
In 1956 under a new constitution the Legislative Council was to consist of eleven officials and eleven non-officials. Of the non-officials, five were Africans chosen by the three Provincial Councils. Chinyama was one of those chosen. In 1959, Hastings Banda had assumed the leadership of the Congress and was making populist speeches around the country that were to lead to his arrest later in the year. Chinyama was considered by this time to be a "quisling" for having cooperated with the colonial government. By September 1960, with elections being organized under universal suffrage as a step towards independence, Chinyama had passed into political oblivion, although he did attempt to continue a political career in July 1962 when, along with Pemba Ndovi and Charles Matinga, he formed a rival political party, the Convention African National Union (CANU), which, in a direct reference to Hastings Banda, called for an end to "one man, one party, one leader in Nyasaland".
