= Southworth Commission =

The Southworth Commission was a Commission of inquiry appointed by the governor of the British Nyasaland Protectorate (the present-day Republic of Malawi) to investigate allegations of police brutality against demonstrators protesting against the State of Emergency that the governor had declared in February 1959. The demonstration took place during the visit of the British Prime Minister, Harold Macmillan to Blantyre in January 1960 as part of his African tour, and was witnessed by British and other journalists, some of whom made allegations against senior European police officers. The inquiry cleared the police of brutality but went beyond its terms of reference by heavily criticising several British correspondents for distorting events.

== Background ==
In January 1959, Hastings Banda, president of the Nyasaland African Congress, presented proposals for constitutional reform to the governor, Sir Robert Armitage, which would have led to Nyasaland's withdrawal from the Federation of Rhodesia and Nyasaland. The governor's rejection led to an increase in anti-government protests, some violence and inflammatory statements by leading Congress activists. Armitage decided against making any concessions to Congress, and prepared for mass arrests by requesting European troops of the Rhodesia Regiment to be sent to Nyasaland and, on 3 March 1959, he declared a State of Emergency, ordering the arrest of Banda and leading Nyasaland African Congress members and their imprisonment in Rhodesia. Many other Congress members were detained within Nyasaland.

A Commission under Lord Devlin which reported in July 1959 exonerated Banda from being involved in the promotion of violence. This opened the way for the British government to negotiate with him on a credible constitution for Nyasaland's future. However, it was only after the British Prime Minister, Harold Macmillan’s "Wind of Change" African tour in January and February 1960, which included a visit to Nyasaland, that Banda was released from detention in April 1960, and the State of Emergency was not lifted until 16 June 1960.

The Nyasaland African Congress was banned on 3 March 1959, but soon after the Malawi Congress Party was formed as its successor, although it became much larger and more a populist organisation than its predecessor. It also created two grassroots organisations, the League of Malawi Women and the League of Malawi Youth. The former capitalised on the authorities' reluctance to arrest and, even more, to jail women: the latter was the party's militant wing, recruited from unemployed and disaffected young people aged between 17 and 35, it claimed over 25,000 members in 1960 and, in the opinion of government intelligence officers, its members were used to lead demonstrations and to undertake intimidation and violent acts against party opponents.

== The "Blantyre Riot" ==
It was known that Macmillan would attend a civic luncheon at Ryall's Hotel, Blantyre on 26 January 1960. By the time of Macmillan's visit to Blantyre, there had been some relaxation in the emergency regulations, so demonstrations were possible, but placards and banners were prohibited. Since the declaration of the State of Emergency, the Nyasaland police force had been expanded significantly, and special anti-riot squads had been formed to counter any violence. The Malawi Congress Party decided to organise what was intended to be a non-violent demonstration led by 50 to 80 League of Malawi Youth activists outside the hotel, to agitate against continued emergency restrictions and the imprisonment of Banda and to gain publicity, as the event would receive widespread press coverage.

Reports by journalists present on 26 January put the total number of watching what they described as a boisterous but largely peaceful demonstration as 800 to 1,000, far more than the number actively demonstrating and carrying banners. Some of the British journalists present reported that the police provoked a riot by tearing down banners, striking demonstrators with batons and making arrests. They also reported that police violence was indiscriminate, as spectators in the crowd were attacked and arrested, and that European officers were involved in the violence. Others British journalists were less critical of the police, arguing that the demonstrators had taunted the police or appeared threatening. The journalists’ attitude was not dependent on their or their newspapers' political stance; one of the strongest condemnations was by Peregrine Worsthorne writing for the Telegraph. On the other hand, Rhodesian journalists claimed the police had responded to attacks with the minimum of force. Photographs that apparently showed both police brutality and demonstrator violence were published in support of conflicting accounts

== The inquiry ==
Within a few days, several British newspapers called for an impartial inquiry into the police handling of the demonstration. Armitage argued that this was a minor demonstration and that the journalists accompanying Macmillan had exaggerated, if not invented, claims of police brutality. He sought to discredit them and argued against the need for an inquiry. However, the Colonial Secretary, Ian Macleod bowed to press and parliamentary pressure and, on 2 February, agreed to a judge-led inquiry, instructing Armitage to arrange it.

The Southworth Commission, with Justice Frederic Southworth of the Nyasaland High Court as its sole commissioner, was appointed by the governor of Nyasaland to inquire into the disturbances on 26 January and, in particular into allegations of police brutality, including that by two named senior European policeman. It was not mandated to inquire into press coverage. Justice Southworth had significant experience of colonial law enforcement practices in such violent regions as India during the Second World War, Palestine during partition and Tanganyika

Southworth's findings cleared the Nyasaland police of brutality and heavily criticised British correspondents for distorting events. He concluded that the police tearing down the demonstrators' banners was in reaction to the crowd's aggressive behaviour, which in part he attributed to the presence of the press. Finally, Southworth determined that the two European police officers named as having used excessive force had acted with restraint in the face of intense provocation.

Although there may have been some degree of press exaggeration and League of Malawi Youth protesters may have exploited the presence of the press, Southworth's claim to be impartial was damaged by his minimising the injuries suffered by protesters and the stinging attacks he made, less on the integrity of the journalists who had given evidence against the police than on his views about their personalities and apparent preconceptions about the use of force.

== Aftermath ==
The British Government was concerned by Southworth's attacks on the press, but did not ask him or Armitage to tone these down. However, it moved to minimise any adverse impact by having the report published as a Nyasaland Government document, not a British Government one, and by only making a short written parliamentary statement, avoiding any parliamentary debate The newspapers whose journalists were criticised made little comment. The written Commons statement accepted the inquiry conclusions as disproving the allegations of brutality against the police.

The press coverage highlighted to the British public and parliament the strength of African opposition to the Federation of Rhodesia and Nyasaland and the degree of coercion needed to preserve the Federation against that opposition. The events of 1959 and early 1960 discredited Armitage: he lost McLeod's confidence and seen as an obstacle to progress by Macleod and unacceptable to the Malawi Congress Party. After Banda's release, and although his governorship was not due to end until April 1961, Armitage was advised go on leave in August 1960 and he retired without returning to Nyasaland. Southworth remained a judge and, on Malawi's independence in 1964, he became the first Chief Justice in the Judiciary of Malawi.
