= Levi Zililo Mumba =

Colonial-era Malawian politician (d. 1945)

Levi Zililo Mumba Levi Zililo Mumba

President of the Nyasaland African Congress
- In office October 1944 – January 1945
- Succeeded by: Charles Matinga

Personal details
- Died: January 1945

Levi Zililo Mumba (died January 1945) was a leading local politician and the first President of the Nyasaland African Congress (NAC) during the period of British colonial rule in Nyasaland, which became the independent state of Malawi in 1964. Mumba was probably the most important figure in the development of Malawi politics between World War I and World War II.

== Early years ==
Levi Mumba was a Tumbuka by tribe and spoke the Tumbuka language as his native tongue. He was a graduate of the Overtoun Institution of the Livingstonia Mission, founded by Scottish missionaries in northern Nyasaland, which educated several of the early African leaders in the colony. Mumba passed his final examinations at the institute in 1903 with flying colors and was the first to take a commercial course. From March 1905 until 1915 he was the first African teacher of commercial subjects, as well as the bookkeeper of the Institution.

== Native association leader ==
Mumba was elected secretary of the North Nyasa Native Association when it was formed in 1912, the first of several such associations of educated "natives". In 1923 the Mwenzo Welfare Association was formed by Mumba's old school-mate, Donald Siwale, with a constitution based on that of the North Nyasa Native Association.Mumba was the architect of many of these associations, which had very similar constitutions. In a 1924 memo, Mumba described the purpose of these associations as to bring better local conditions and to represent public opinion more effectively to the colonial administrators than was done by the chiefs and headmen.

In 1924 Mumba expressed the hope that the associations could "assume national importance by amalgamation under a central body". That year, he established a Representative Committee of the Northern Provinces Associations at Zomba, the capital of Nyasaland in the southern province. His brother-in-law Mopho Jere became secretary of the Representative Committee in 1928 and its president some time before 1937. The Representative Committee forwarded complaints to the central government about the behavior of colonial officials, and made requests for government assistance in expanding cash crop farming and the retail trade.

Mumba and James Frederick Sangala in Blantyre became the leaders of the Native Association movement in the 1930s. During this period, the white colonists of Southern Rhodesia (now Zimbabwe) and Northern Rhodesia (now Zambia) were pushing for unification, and wanted to include Nyasaland in the union, seeing Nyasaland as a useful source of labor that might otherwise be drawn to South Africa. Nyasas resisted this move since they regarded the Rhodesias as "White Man" territory, and preferred the trusteeship arrangement in Nyasaland under which they had greater rights. As early as 1935, the Blantyre Native Association led by Sangala called a meeting of leaders in the area where they were invited to sign a petition opposing amalgamation. When the colonial administration asked the chiefs for views on unification in 1938, the formal statement in reply was in fact composed by Mumba.

Writing on behalf of the Representative Committee in a letter to the Chief Secretary of the colony dated April 1935, Mumba asked why Africans were not allowed a greater role in the celebrations of the King's birthday and in the swearing-in ceremony for the Governor. He said that "...That such an important Government function should ignore or fail to find a place for even its few senior African officers ... including some well-to-do and respectable Africans, who can be of help in explaining the meaning of the occasion to others later, has created the wrong idea that they are not wanted there, and adds to their perplexities". There is a note of elitism here, distinguishing between educated men and the less sophisticated chiefs and headmen. Later, Mumba put the case more simply: "the natives of the country should be taken into the confidence of the government as His Majesty's subject like all others ... the natives are considered as children in these matters, and so they are, but it is as children when they can better be initiated into what is demanded of them when they grow up".

On 12 May 1935 he talked with the governor, Sir Harold Kittermaster, on the subject of the proper method of communication between the government and Africans. He opposed the policy of the time which was to go through the Native Administrations, dominated by conservative chiefs and headmen, and recommended a greater voice for the Associations. He argued that the members of the Associations were in closer touch with the Europeans and better able to express opinions in a comprehensible way. However, the colonial government refused to take the Native Authorities or the Associations and their aspirations seriously before the Second World War.

== Nyasaland African Congress leader ==
The Nyasaland African Congress was the first organization that attempted to work at a national level. At the inaugural meeting of the Congress held in Blantyre in October 1944, Mumba was elected President-General. James Sangala, the other main mover in creating the Congress, had recently been transferred to Dedza in the Central province and was unable to attend, but was elected to the central committee. As with most members of the Congress, Mumba was privileged to come from a respected family and to have mission education. The leaders of the Congress included pastors and teachers such as Mumba from the earlier Associations, but tended to now also include civil servants, clerks and businessmen. Soon after being elected, in January 1945 Mumba died. He was succeeded by Charles Matinga. Without the leadership of Mumba and of Isaac Lawrence, who also died around that time, the congress lost momentum.

== Views on religion and education ==
In 1929, Mumba was associated with formation of the African National Church, which permitted polygamy. Although Christian, Mumba wrote an article titled "The Religion of my Fathers" that defended traditional beliefs from attack by ignorant and prejudiced people. The article appeared in the International Review of Missions in 1930, submitted by the missionary Cullen Young and attributed only to "a member of one of the Nyasaland tribes". In this essay he emphasized the importance of mediation in the Ngoni culture, where the spirits of ancestors mediated between living people and the deity.

When the colonial government proposed making the Nyanja language the standard language of schools, on the basis that it was widely spoken in Nyasaland, Mumba opposed the idea as a representative of speakers of the Tumbuka language. He said that people wanted to first learn books in their native tongue, and then to learn English, which was more useful. He proposed that if an official language be adopted, it should be English.

In 1932, Mumba prepared a memorandum advocating improved higher education for Africans, which was received without enthusiasm. In 1934, Mumba asked the government to pay part of his son's secondary schooling in South Africa in the absence of a local alternative. The government reluctantly provided £13-10-0. The Chief Secretary commented on the incident: "Such cases will continue to be rare for some time to come, fortunately I think, since the slower the progress - in the direction of higher education for the African - the better".

However, Mumba was appointed to the Advisory Committee on Education in 1933. He participated in the debate on Colored education in the Advisory Committee in 1934, arguing against free primary education for just one section of the community (the "Coloreds" or so-called half-castes) and arguing in favor of including the whole community. A 1934 memorandum that Mumba prepared on post-primary and higher education was rejected by the Advisory Committee. In a report prepared for the colonial authorities in 1938 he said: "...the training which the African has received hitherto both in schools and through contact with white men whether as semi-skilled or unskilled workers has been aimed at fitting him as a worker for, instead of a worker with, the white man...".
