= James Frederick Sangala =

Nyasaland politician

James Frederick Sangala James Frederick Sangala
- James Frederick Sangala

President of the Nyasaland African Congress
- In office January 1954 – January 1957
- Preceded by: James Ralph Nthinda Chinyama
- Succeeded by: Thamar Dillon Thomas Banda

Personal details
- Born: c. 1900

James Frederick Sangala was a founding member of the Nyasaland African Congress during the period of British colonial rule. Sangala was given the nickname "Pyagusi", which means "one who perseveres".

Sangala was born in a village in the highlands of what is now southern Malawi, near the Domasi Presbyterian Mission, around 1900, a few years after the British had established the British Central Africa Protectorate. He completed Standard VI (American 8th grade, approximately) at school in Blantyre in about 1921 and for at least the next five years taught at Domasi. Thereafter, until around 1930, he earned between 30/- (shillings) and 75/- a month working for a succession of businessmen as clerk, book-keeper and capitao (foreman). From 1930 until around 1942 he held clerical positions assisting successive Provincial and District Commissioners in the colonial administration. In 1942, he became an interpreter at the High Court. He then retired to earn his living with a brick-making business.

In the 1930s, Sangala became a leader of the Native Association movement in Nyasaland, encouraging the formation of local representative groups. In 1943 he was a founder and the acting secretary of the Nyasaland African Congress (NAC), which sought to give a unified voice to the local associations and to press for greater rights for Africans. From 1954 to 1956 he was president of the Congress, but was persuaded to resign to make way for more radical members who were seeking full independence. Despite his moderate stand, Sangala was arrested for his activities more than once in the 1950s. Renamed the Malawi Congress Party, the NAC was to win all the seats in the 1961 Nyasaland elections, and to lead the country to self-governance in 1963 and full independence as the state of Malawi in 1964.

== Birth and education ==
James Frederick Sangala was born around 1900 at Naisi, near the town of Zomba in the highlands of what is now southern Malawi. Zomba was the residence of the colonial governor and the administrative center of the British Central Africa Protectorate, renamed Nyasaland in 1907. Sangala was a Mang'anja. His mother was a herbalist who specialized in treatment of trichomonas. Sangala was educated at Zomba Mission primary school and then at Blantyre Mission substation at Domasi. He qualified as a teacher in 1923 and taught primary school until 1927.

== Working career ==
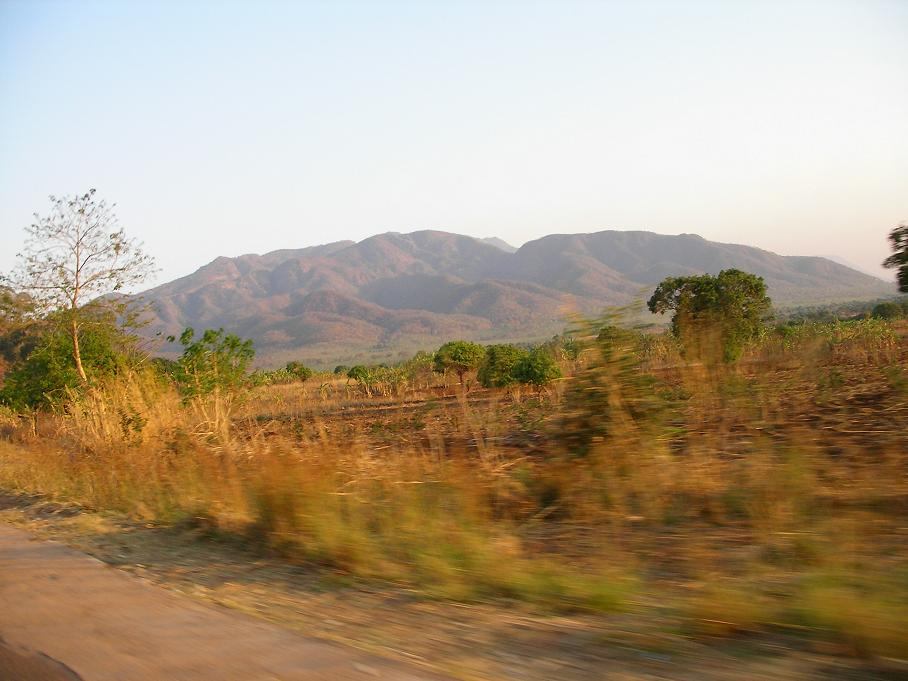
Zomba Plateau to the north of Zomba

In search of higher wages, Sangala obtained work with Limbe Trading Company in 1927, then as a cotton buyer with the British Cotton Growing Association (BGGA) and next as a bookkeeper for M.G. Dharap, an Indian businessman in Limbe. In March 1928 he started work for the African Lakes Corporation, and in May 1929 returned to the BGGA as an office manager.

Dissatisfied with the working conditions for Africans in businesses, Sangala joined the civil service in April 1930 as a clerk in the office of the Provincial Commissioner in Blantyre. He then worked for the Blantyre District Commissioner and the Blantyre District Medical Office until July 1942. His work involved typing and other forms of assistance to the commissioner. In July 1942, Sangala transferred to the Judicial Department of the civil service in Blantyre as an interpreter. He was moved to the Dedza District Office in 1944, in his view because of his political activities. In 1947 he returned to the Blantyre District Office, but retired in the early 1950s so he could spend more time on politics, receiving a small government pension and running a brick manufacturing business as his main source of income.

== Native Associations ==
The North Nyasa Native Association was formed in 1912, and was followed by several other such associations in the early part of the century, typically composed of the educated elite: teachers, church leaders and civil servants. The Native Associations sought to gain a voice in administrative, economic and other issues. They met some resistance from tribal leaders, but on the whole were encouraged by the colonial administrations. Their emphasis was regional or national rather than tribal. Meetings were often attended by representatives of other associations, helping them exchange views on issues and approaches. James Frederick Sangala in Blantyre and Levi Mumba in the rest of the country became leaders of the Native Association movement in Nyasaland during the 1930s. Sangala and Mumba both believed in the importance of Nyasa unity and in the virtues of democratic civil society.

During the 1930s, the white colonists of Southern Rhodesia (now Zimbabwe) and Northern Rhodesia (now Zambia) were pushing for unification, and wanted to include Nyasaland in the union, seeing Nyasaland as a useful source of labor that might otherwise be drawn to South Africa. Nyasas resisted this move since they regarded the Rhodesias as "White Man" territory, and preferred the trusteeship arrangement in Nyasaland under which they had greater rights. As early as 1935, the Blantyre Native Association led by Sangala called a meeting of leaders in the area where they were invited to sign a petition opposing amalgamation. When the colonial administration asked the chiefs for views on unification in 1938, the formal statement in reply was in fact composed by Mumba.

== Nyasaland African Congress 1943 – 1953 ==
The Nyasaland Educated African Council emerged in 1943 from the leaders of the Native Associations, calling for a rapid movement towards self-government. A few months later the Council renamed itself the Nyasaland African Congress (NAC) at the urging of Sangala, who felt the movement should not be restricted to the educated elite. Sangala was acting secretary at the meeting in May 1944 at which the Congress was announced. He was unable to attend the formal inaugural meeting of the Congress in October 1944, at which Levi Zililo Mumba was elected President-General, since he had been transferred to Dedza in the Central province, but he was elected to the central committee. Sangala, Mumba and their associates had a vision of the NAC becoming "the mouthpiece of the Africans", cooperating with the government and other colonial bodies "in any matters necessary to speed up the progress of Nyasaland".

Sangala encouraged the Congress to "Fight for Freedom", although he was careful to explain to the colonial powers that he did not mean armed conflict by that phrase. Sangala explained to the District Commissioner, Eric Barnes, that he advocated peaceful protests against practices such as curfews and pass laws which treated Africans as a subordinate race. Sangala was not always consistent. In 1949 he accepted a position as a member of the protectorate's Boy Scouts Council. Although in theory open to all races, in practice this organization segregated European, Indian and African boys.

The NAC was intended to be an umbrella organization that would coordinate the Native Associations and other local organizations of indigenous people in the protectorate of Nyasaland. Sangala ensured that each of these groups would have a seat on the executive committee of the NAC. However, the organization was weak. When a special committee including Sangala recommended acceptance of Dr. Hastings Banda's proposal that the NAC should have a full-time paid secretary, the proposal was rejected overwhelmingly, perhaps due to suspicion of Banda's motives.

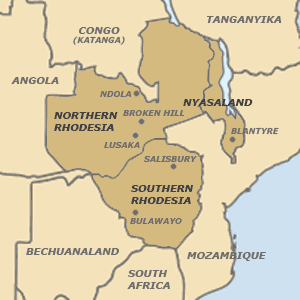
Federation of Rhodesia and Nyasaland

By 1950, the NAC had fallen into disarray, forcing the President Charles Matinga to resign for misusing Congress funds. Sangala threw his efforts into reviving the organization, leading to an important meeting in August 1950 in Mzimba where James Chinyama was elected president, with Sangala Vice-President. Until the early 1950s, Sangala and other leaders such as Doctor Hastings Banda assumed that Nyasaland should evolve towards self-government while remaining under the authority of the British Colonial Office. However, in 1953 the Colonial Office established the Federation of Rhodesia and Nyasaland in which Europeans would retain a position of leadership, abandoning the earlier principles of partnership between the races. The NAC leaders saw this as a betrayal. Uncoordinated protests followed, which were forcefully suppressed, with an official death toll of eleven Africans. Sangala was arrested in September 1953, but was released the next month when the magistrate dismissed the charges.

== Nyasaland African Congress President 1954 – 1956 ==
In January 1954 Sangala was elected President of the Congress. Although he continued to advocate civil disobedience, he also accepted the decision of two NAC members to run for election for the two seats reserved for Nyasas in the Federal Parliament. This ambiguous position was rejected by some members of the party, who were against any participation in the government. Some resigned or were dismissed. Others who remained in the party attempted a coup towards the end of 1955, calling for resignation of the two MPs and for the NAC to work for immediate secession from the federation and self-rule. Although the leaders of a coup attempt were forced to resign, they remained politically influential.

Sangala was conscientious in attending committee meetings, but was handicapped by the need to attend to his own business affairs, often unavailable to provide leadership or advice. In March 1956, Sangala announced that for health reasons he would not run again for President of Congress. Sangala continued to press London to accept the principle of democratic elections to the Legislative Council, or Legco. Sangala asserted his right of freedom of movement and was arrested. He made sure this was reported in England. In May 1956, Sangala stood trial at the High Court for sedition. He was charged with having advised Thamar Dillon Thomas Banda, the secretary-general of the Congress, to hand a seditious publication to the editor of the Nyasaland Times. The charge was the subject of a question in the British House of Commons.

In January 1957, Sangala was persuaded to resign from his position as Nyasaland African Congress President, and was replaced by Thamar Dillon Thomas Banda. The NAC was banned by the colonial authorities in 1959, and was succeeded by the Malawi Congress Party (MCP), led from prison by Dr. Hastings Banda. The British came to accept that independence was inevitable. Hastings Banda was released in 1960 and allowed to return to prepare for elections. By then, Sangala and other members of the old guard of the Congress had faded into oblivion and were rarely heard of again. In 1961 the MCP overwhelmingly won the first elections held under universal suffrage, and in 1963 the country gained self governance followed by independence the next year with the new name of Malawi.

Sangala's grandson, Aaron Sangala, was appointed Minister of Internal Affairs and Public Security in the Cabinet of Malawi in May 2009.

== Character ==
Sangala was described by W.L. Jennings, the High Court Registrar in Blantyre, as a "peculiar" but "charming" man whose motto was "to struggle for the freedom and peace of all". Some critics said he was autocratic, but others thought he was too mild. He was not interested in publicity, and avoided conflict, preferring to work behind the scenes in organizing the party. But in a crisis, he was willing to stand forward. In an interview in August 1961 he said "My first duty was to do such things [that would] ... cause people to be happy. Due to this aim I do not fear to speak to any person provided it is the truth and this always does not please my friends who suggest that I am a difficult person". Sangala was a strong believer in the virtues of dignity, and refused to accept common views within colonial society that the "natives" were in any way inferior to Whites.
