= Thamar Dillon Thomas Banda =

Malawian politician

President of the Nyasaland African Congress
- In office January 1957 – July 1958
- Preceded by: James Frederick Sangala
- Succeeded by: Hastings Banda

Thamar Dillon Thomas Banda ("TDT") was a politician in Nyasaland in the years prior to independence. He was President-General of the Nyasaland African Congress (NAC) from 1957 to 1958, and founded the Congress Liberation Party in 1959.

== Background ==
TDT Banda was a Tonga born in Nkhata Bay on the shores of Lake Nyasa in around 1910. He had spent most if not all of the 1940s abroad in Southern Rhodesia before returning to Nyasaland, when he joined the Nkhata Bay branch of NAC.

The Nyasaland African Congress was organized by James Frederick Sangala and Levi Zililo Mumba, and inaugurated in October 1944 with Mumba as President. Sangala, Mumba and their associates had a vision of the NAC becoming "the mouthpiece of the Africans", cooperating with the government and other colonial bodies "in any matters necessary to speed up the progress of Nyasaland". By the mid-1950s, African leaders in European colonies throughout Africa were encouraged by the example of Ghana's independence to take a more aggressive stand in seeking independence.

== NAC Secretary-General ==
TDT Banda had sought to stand for a seat in the Legislative Council (LegCo) in March 1956 when the constitution was amended to allow five instead of three seats to Africans, but the NAC nominated Nephas Kwenje in his place. Possibly as a consolation, he was instead elected Secretary-General of the Congress on 30 March 1956. Sangala, now President of the Congress, and TDT Banda were arrested by the colonial authorities and tried for sedition in May 1956. The charges related to a "seditious publication" handed by Banda to the editor of the Nyasaland Times. The charge was the subject of a question in the British House of Commons. A delegation of women traveled by bus to the High Court in Zomba led by Rose Chibambo, the Treasurer of the NAC and later the organizer of the Malawi Congress Party Women's League after 1958. The women were arrested after demonstrating, chanting:

"War! War! War today!
We are going to have war.
We don't want, we don't want, we don't want federation.
We want freedom today!"

Sangala was not an accomplished public speaker, while TDT was in his element at rallies. According to Henry Chipembere, his "habit of yelling and performing acrobatics on the platform earned him the nickname wakufuntha (the insane one)". In January 1957, activists persuaded the veteran Sangala to step down and replaced him by the younger TDT.

== NAC President ==
The colonial authorities had created the Federation of Rhodesia and Nyasaland in 1953, an unpopular measure with Congress leaders, and had allocated two seats in the federal parliament for African MPs from Nyasaland. Sangala had accepted the decision of two Congress members to take these seats against opposition from members of the Congress who opposed participation in such an unrepresentative body. In 1957, TDT Banda called on the Congress to ask the two MPs to withdraw. When they refused, in July 1957 they were expelled from the party. In September–October 1957, Congress leaders met government representative to discuss constitutional changes. Observers at this meetings said that TDT did not perform well. He lacked "intellectual clarity and depth" and was often confused. Shortly after, the government withdrew recognition of Congress as the official representatives of Africans. TDT Banda endorsed a strike by the Transport and Allied Workers Union. He was the first to mobilize youth to spread awareness of the NAC as "Kwacha builders".

TDT Banda attended the celebrations in Ghana in March 1957, where he met Dr. Hastings Banda (not a relative) and asked him to return to Nyasaland to lead the nationalist movement. In July 1958, Hastings Banda did return. TDT had been forced to resign on charges of misappropriating funds, and Hastings Banda was elected President of the NAC in his place. TDT had failed to satisfy either the radicals or the conservative old guard in his party. Later Hastings Banda was arrested and the NAC banned.

== Later career ==
In March 1961, TDT Banda formed the Congress Liberation Party (CLP) along with Chester Katsonga, who had founded the Christian Democratic Party in October 1960. Other moderates, including Gilbert Pondeponde, David Mukumphi Chirwa and N. D. Kwenje, also joined this party as well as all the members of the Nkata Bay branch of the NAC, including Filemon Phiri. Chester Katsonga's house was burned down by members of the League of Malawi Youth; Gilbert Pondeponde was murdered by members of the same group; the Malawi Congress Party, successor to the NAC, through such intimidation as well as widespread popular support, won the 1962 elections overwhelmingly, and TDT Banda and other members of the old guard of the Congress faded into oblivion and were rarely heard of again.
