= Nyasaland African Congress =

Political party in Nyasaland (modern Malawi)

The Nyasaland African Congress (NAC) was an organisation that evolved into a political party in Nyasaland during the colonial period. The NAC was suppressed in 1959, but was succeeded in 1960 by the Malawi Congress Party, which went to on decisively win the first universal suffrage elections in 1961, and to lead the country to independence as Malawi in 1964.

== Origins ==
The North Nyasa Native Association when it was formed in 1912, the first of several such associations of educated "natives". Levi Zililo Mumba was elected secretary. Mumba was the architect of many of these associations, which had very similar constitutions, established in the 1920s and early 1930s. The Nyasaland African Congress (NAC) was organised in 1943 by leaders of the Nyasaland Native Associations, with Mumba and James Frederick Sangala of Blantyre the prime movers. The NAC was the first organisation that attempted to work at a national level. At first named the Nyasaland Educated African Council, a few months later the Council renamed itself the Nyasaland African Congress (NAC) at the urging of Sangala, who felt the movement should not be restricted to the educated elite.

The NAC was intended to be an umbrella organisation that would co-ordinate the Native Associations and other local organisations of indigenous people in the protectorate of Nyasaland. Each of these groups had a seat on the executive committee. However, the organisation was weak. When a special committee recommended acceptance of Dr. Hastings Banda's proposal that the NAC should have a full-time paid secretary, the proposal was rejected overwhelmingly, perhaps due to suspicion of Banda's motives.

At the inaugural meeting of the Congress held in Blantyre in October 1944, Mumba was elected President-General. Sangala had recently been transferred to Dedza in the Central province and was unable to attend, but was elected to the central committee. As with most members of the Congress, Mumba was privileged to come from a respected family and to have mission education. The leaders of the Congress included pastors and teachers such as Mumba from the earlier Associations, but tended to now also include civil servants, clerks and businessmen. Soon after being elected, in January 1945 Mumba died. He was succeeded by Charles Matinga. Without the leadership of Mumba and of Isaac Lawrence, who also died around that time, the Congress lost momentum.

== Cooperation to confrontation ==
By 1950, interest in the NAC was starting to revive. At an important meeting in August 1950 in Mzimba, James Chinyama was elected President, with Sangala Vice-President. Until the early 1950s, Sangala and other leaders such as Dr. Hastings Banda believed that Nyasaland should evolve towards self-government while remaining under the authority of the British Colonial Office. However, in 1953 the Colonial Office established the Federation of Rhodesia and Nyasaland in which Europeans would retain a position of leadership, abandoning the earlier principles of partnership between the races. The NAC leaders saw this as a betrayal.

In January 1954 Sangala was elected President of the Congress. Although he continued to advocate civil disobedience, he also accepted the decision of two NAC members to run for election for the two seats reserved for Nyasas in the Federal Parliament. This ambiguous position was rejected by some members of the party, who were against any participation in the government. Some resigned or were dismissed. Others who remained in the party attempted a coup towards the end of 1955, calling for resignation of the two MPs and for the NAC to work for immediate secession from the federation and self-rule. Although the leaders of a coup attempt were forced to resign, they remained politically influential.

Thamar Dillon Thomas Banda was elected Secretary-General of the Congress on 30 March 1956. Sangala and TDT Banda were arrested by the colonial authorities and tried for sedition in May 1956. Sangala was not an accomplished public speaker, while TDT was in his element at rallies. In January 1957, activists persuaded the veteran Sangala to step down and replaced him by the younger TDT. In September–October 1957, Congress leaders met government representative to discuss constitutional changes. Shortly after, the government withdrew recognition of Congress as the official representatives of Africans.

TDT Banda attended the celebrations in Ghana in March 1957, where he met Dr. Hastings Banda (not a relative) and asked him to return to Nyasaland to lead the nationalist movement. TDT failed to satisfy either the radicals or the conservative old guard in his party. In July 1958, Hastings Banda did return. TDT had been forced to resign on charges of misappropriating funds, and Hastings Banda was elected President of the NAC in his place.

== Suppression and aftermath ==
Hastings Banda embarked on a speaking tour, stirring up unrest. By February 1959, the situation had become serious enough that Rhodesian troops were flown in to help keep order, a state of emergency was declared and the NAC was banned. On 3 March, Banda, along with hundreds of other Africans, was arrested in the course of "Operation Sunrise".

The NAC was succeeded by the Malawi Congress Party (MCP), led from prison by Hastings Banda. The British came to accept that independence was inevitable. Hastings Banda was released in 1960 and allowed to return to prepare for elections. In 1961 the MCP overwhelmingly won the first elections held under universal suffrage, and in 1963 the country gained self governance followed by independence the next year with the new name of Malawi.

== Leadership ==
Term start	Term end	President-General
October 1944	January 1945	Levi Zililo Mumba
January 1945	January 1950	Charles Matinga
August 1950	1954	James Chinyama
1954	January 1957	James Frederick Sangala
January 1957	July 1958	Thamar Dillon Thomas Banda
August 1958	1959	Hastings Banda
