= Livingstonia Mission =

Historic Presbyterian mission in northern Malawi

- Founded: 1875
- Type: Mission station
- Location: Livingstonia, Rumphi District, Malaŵi
- Key people: Robert Laws, David Clement Scott, Donald Fraser
- Parent organisation: Free Church of Scotland

Livingstonia Mission is a historic Presbyterian Christian mission station in northern Malawi, founded in 1875 by the Free Church of Scotland. It became a major center for education, medicine, printing, anti-slavery activism, agriculture, and Tumbuka language development. The mission was named in honor of Scottish missionary, David Livingstone.

== History ==
The Livingstonia Mission was approved in 1874 by the Free Church of Scotland Mission Committee to continue the vision of David Livingstone. The first station was opened in 1875 at Cape Maclear on the shores of Lake Malawi, but malaria forced a relocation to Bandawe in 1881. In 1894, Robert Laws moved it again to the cooler highlands near the Nyika Plateau, forming the present-day Livingstonia town.

== Anti-slavery activism ==
The mission opposed the East African slave trade around Lake Malawi. It documented raids, pressured colonial administrators, and provided refuge to freed captives. Donald Fraser was one of the key voices advancing anti-slavery advocacy in the region.

== Education ==
The mission founded major institutions including Livingstonia Secondary School, Livingstonia Theological College, and Kondowe Teacher Training College, as well as the introduction of the Tumbuka language studies in schools. It also introduced vocational apprenticeships in carpentry, mechanical work, and agriculture and trained early northern Malawian teachers, pastors, and medical assistants.

== Mission Press and linguistics ==
The mission established northern Malaŵi’s first major printing press, starting at Bandawe under printer and linguist David Clement Scott. Publications included Tumbuka New Testament translation drafts, hymn books in Tumbuka, School readers in Tumbuka, and dictionaries and grammar manuals aiding Tumbuka orthography.

The press supported early northern Malawi literacy campaigns and local language standardization.

== Medical work ==
Medical outreach began at Bandawe and expanded later in the highlands. Contributions included founding of David Gordon Memorial Hospital (1910).

The mission also trained nurses and medical assistants, ran mobile clinics, and led public-health campaigns against malaria and infectious diseases.

== Agriculture and economy ==
The mission introduced hillside farming innovations such as terrace farming, soil conservation, crop diversification (maize, beans, coffee, fruit trees), tree-planting and conservation projects, including community training manuals printed at the mission press.

== Cultural influence ==
The Livingstonia Mission influenced northern Malawi communities including Tumbuka people, Lambya people, Sukwa people, and Nkhonde people, through intercultural mission outreach.

It promoted local literacy, African clergy leadership, and printed documentation of cultural and linguistic knowledge.

== Notable missionaries ==
Missionary figures linked to the mission include:

- Robert Laws – Medical missionary, institution founder, and anti-slavery activist
- David Clement Scott – Mission press printer and linguist
- Donald Fraser – Educator and social reformer
- Alexander Hetherwick
- Elizabeth Hetherwick
- Janet S. Beck
- Henry Henderson
- Harriet Henderson
- Alexander Dewar – Mission press printer
- David Gordon – Medical outreach missionary and hospital namesake

== Legacy ==
By 1964 independence of Malawi, mission school and health systems influenced colonial governance and later national adoption of education and healthcare infrastructures still active today through mission-founded schools, churches, hospitals, and libraries.

== Timeline ==
1875 – Mission opens at Cape Maclear 1881 – Relocated to Bandawe 1883 – Mission press begins 1894 – Moves to highlands 1910 – David Gordon Memorial Hospital opens 1937 – Kondowe Teacher College established 1964 – Malawi independence Present – Mission-linked institutions continue.

== See also ==
- Tumbuka language
- Tumbuka people
