= Church of Central Africa Presbyterian – Blantyre Synod =

Synod of the Church of Central Africa Presbyterian

Blantyre Synod
- Classification: Protestant
- Polity: Presbyterian
- Associations: Part of Church of Central Africa Presbyterian
- Region: Southern Malawi
- Origin: 1876
- Congregations: 600
- Members: 1.2 million
- Official website: www.ccapblantyresynod.org

The Church of Central Africa Presbyterian – Blantyre Synod is a synod of the Church of Central Africa Presbyterian, located in southern Malawi. It was founded by Church of Scotland missionaries in 1876.

== History ==
Blantyre Synod started as a mission of the Church of Scotland. The first missionary was Henry Henderson accompanied by a freed slave. He chose a mission ground suggested by David Livingstone. The Blantyre Mission was founded in 1876, with a church and school. It became a refuge for slaves. The number of Christians grew, and in 1891 the St Michael and All Angels Church was dedicated.

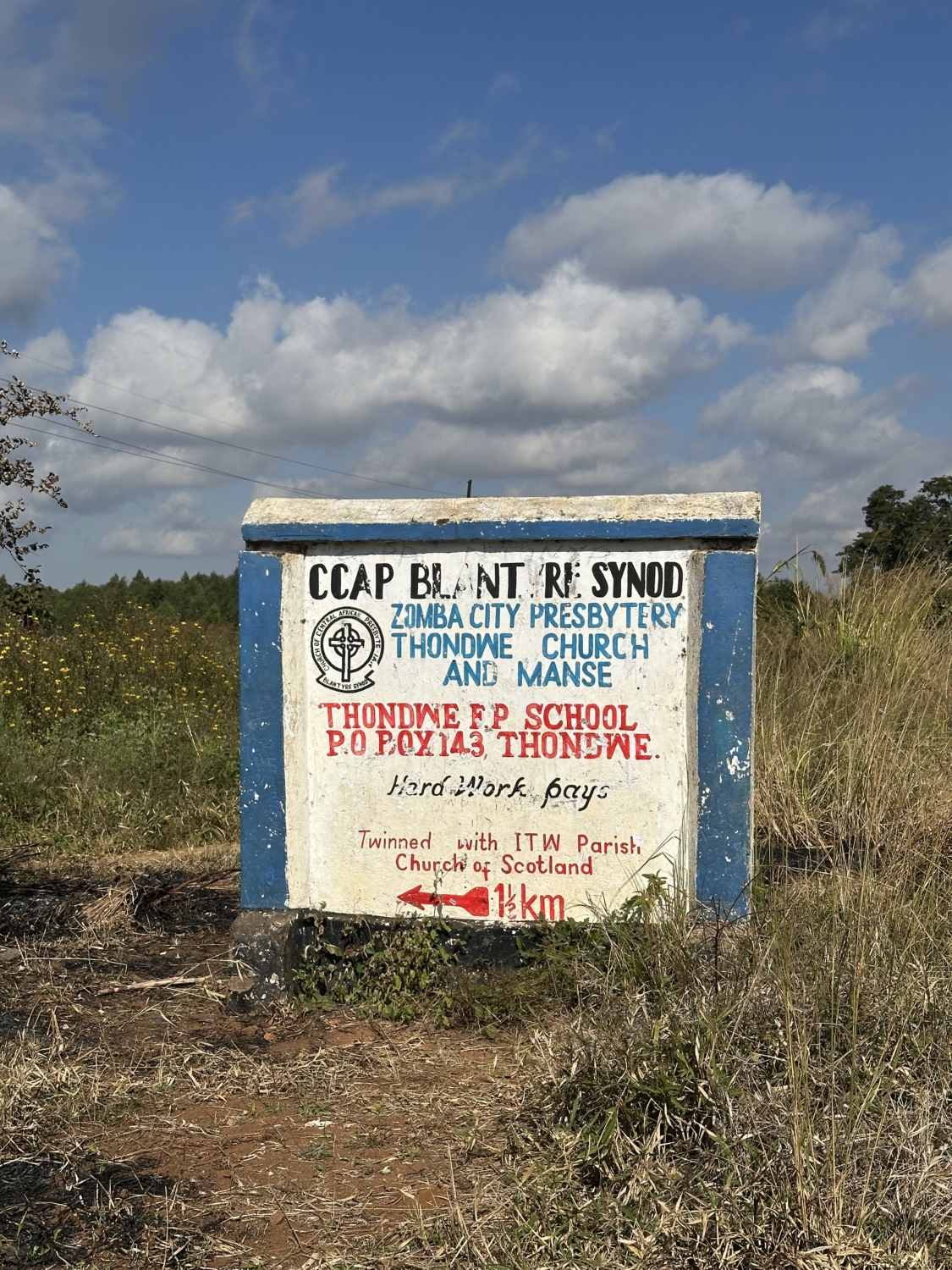
Thondwe F P School - Blantyre CCAP sign

The Mission’s superintendent David Clement Scott believed in racial equality and was called a "negrophile" for his outlook. Scott picked seven men to become deacons they were Harry Kambwiri Matecheta, John Macrae Chipuliko, Mungo Murray Chisuse, John Gray Kufa, Thomas Mpeni, James Gray Kamlinje and James Auldearn Mwembe. Matecheta became a deacon on 4 November 4, 1894. Scott's aim was to increase the role of Africans in the church's leadership, and one woman was also made a deacon.

In the late 1920s, responsibility for the church shifted from Scottish missionaries to African leaders.

In 1962 Rev. Jonathon Sandaya became the first African to be the Synod's General Secretary. He had been born locally and educated at the Henry Henderson Institute.

In January 2020 the head of Malawi's prisons Wandika Phiri went to the prison in Ntcheu where a new water system had been installed. The facility had been paid for by this synod and Phiri thanked the CCAP synod for their generosity.

== Partner churches ==
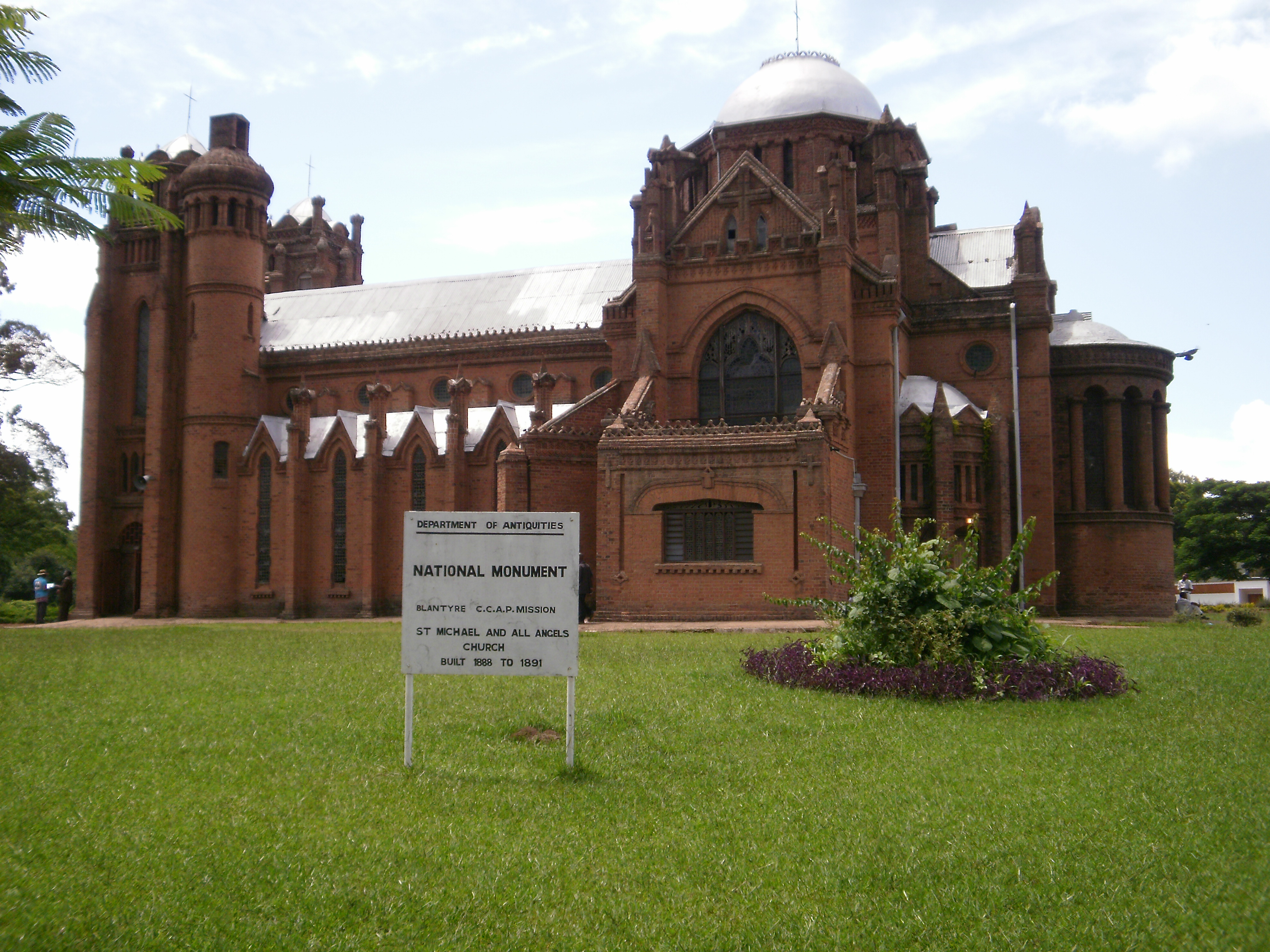
St Michael and All Angels church in Blantyre

- Church of Scotland
- Presbyterian Church (USA) – Pittsburgh Presbytery
- Protestant Church in the Netherlands
- Presbyterian Church in Canada
- Presbyterian Church of Ireland
- Presbyterian Church of Australia

== Theology ==
- Apostles Creed
- Nicene Creed
- Westminster Confession of Faith
- Westminster Larger Catechism
- Westminster Shorter Catechism
