= Maganga, Malawi =

Maganga
- Village
- Interactive map of Maganga
- Coordinates: 14.029°S 33.074°E
- Country: Malawi
- Region: Central
- District: Salima

Maganga also known as Maganaa, Maganga, and Magansa is a Village in the Salima District of Malawi.

Harry Kambwiri Matecheta was a child convert to Christianity who worked under Alexander Hetherwick. Hetherwick encouraged Matecheta to come to the mission in Maganga. Matecheta found it difficult and twice left the village but he was persuaded to return by Hetherwick. Matecheta was to become the first African Presbyterian minister. Another member of the mission was a Scottish widow who would become Elizabeth Hetherwick. She taught girls about laundry and at the mission's Sunday School.
