= Harry Kambwiri Matecheta =

Malawian Presbyterian minister

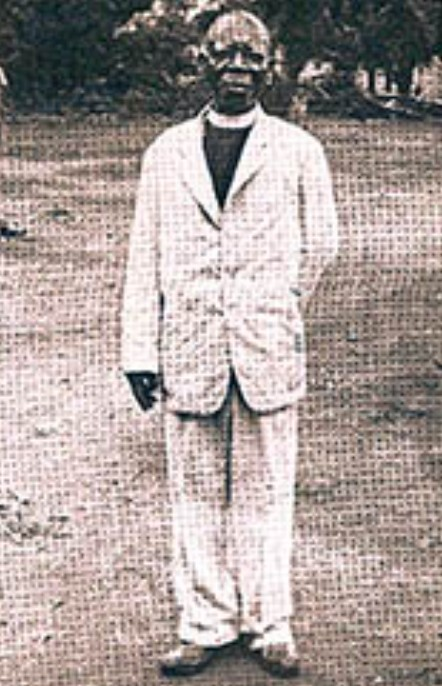
- Matecheta, c. 1925
- Born: 1870; Nguludi, Chiradzulu District, Nyasaland
- Died: July 13, 1962 (aged 91–92)
- Other name: Reverend Harry
- Occupations: clergy and historian
- Known for: Malawi’s first African Presbyterian Minister

Harry Kambwiri Matecheta, also known as Reverend Harry (1870 – 1962) was a Nyasaland minister in Blantyre- the first Presbyterian African clergy and moderator in Malawi.

== Biography ==
Matecheta was a Yao from Nguludi in Che Lopsa’s village in Chiradzulu District. He first encountered Christianity at the age of six during a journey made by Henry Henderson and Tom Bokwito from Cape Maclear to the Shire Highlands in 1876. The expedition aimed to identify a suitable mission site on behalf of the Church of Scotland. The site they selected later became Blantyre, named after David Livingstone's birthplace. Livingstone had previously travelled through the same region in the late 1850s.

Matecheta was a child convert to Christianity who took Alexander Hetherwick as his mentor. Hetherwick encouraged Matecheta to come to the mission in Maganga. Matecheta found it difficult and twice left the village but he was persuaded to return by Hetherwick.

In 1884, Matecheta enrolled at Blantyre Mission, completing up to Standard 4 before becoming a teacher at the same institution. He later received training in printing. He was baptized on December 29, 1889 alongside John Macrae Chipuliko, Mungo Murray Chisuse, Thomas Mpeni, James Gray Kamlinje, James Auldearn Mwembe, and John Gray Kufa, Matecheta was ordained a deacon on 4 November 1894. These seven men were selected by Blantyre Mission superintendent David Clement Scott to form a group of deacons, marking an early stage in his programme to develop indigenous leadership within the African church.

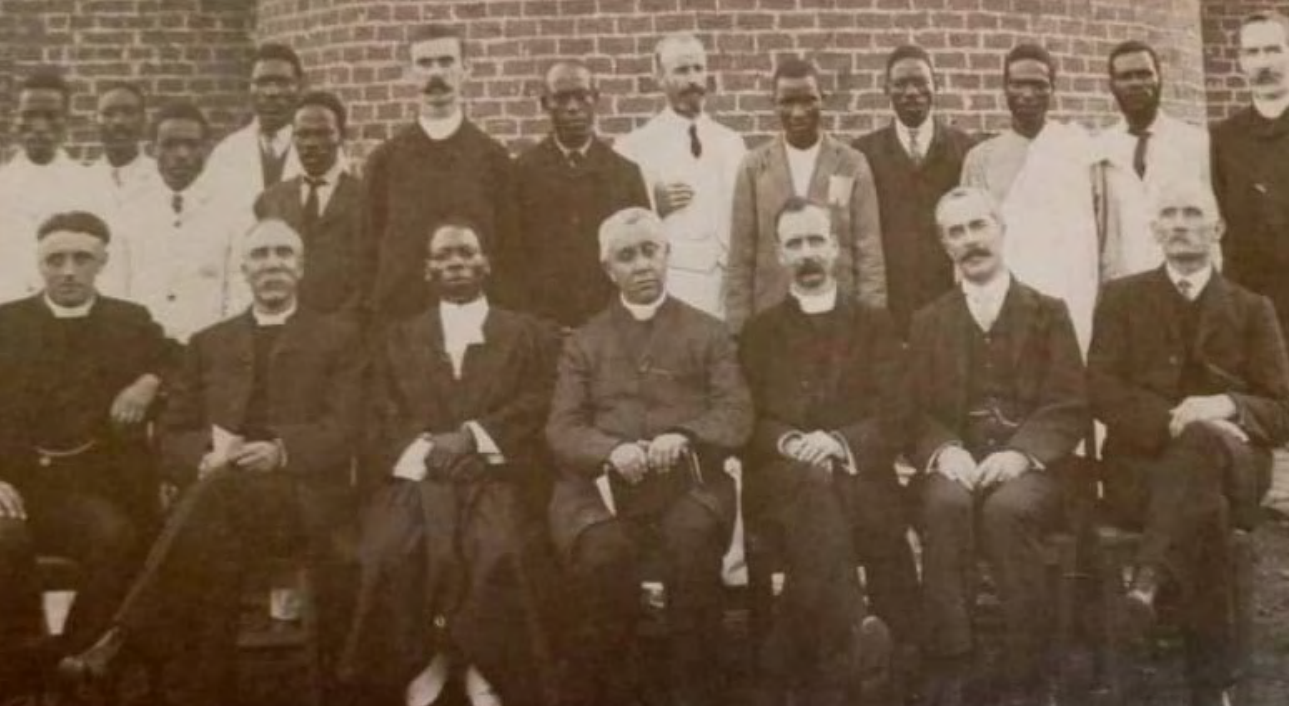
Ordination of Malawi’s first African Presbyterian Minister, Rev Harry Kambwiri Matecheta, 9 March 1911

In Bandawe during the 1920s, Mamie Martin organized classes for girls at a time when many families prioritised the education of their sons. Her husband, Jack Martin, was among the more progressives figures of the period. She was particularly impressed in 1924 after hearing Matecheta speak. "Reverend Harry" became in 1911 the first African Presbyterian ordained minister in Malawi.

Contemporary Presbytery of Blantyre records refer to Matecheta in a paternalistic manner as “Rev. Harry” rather than by his surname. He served at Mulanje Mission, Ntcheu, Blantyre, and other congregations for 46 years. In May 1933, he received a certificate of recognition for his service as a member of the district council and district school committee from King George V.

Matecheta died on 13 July 1962. He was buried at the Bemvu Church of Central Africa Presbyterian cemetery, one of the mission stations to which he had contributed significantly.

In 1951, his book on the Beginnings of Blantyre Mission (Blantyre Mission. Nkhani za Ciyambi Cace, Blantyre: Hetherwick Press) was published. An English translation of Matecheta's book was published in Berlin in 2017, and in 2020 in Mzuzu, Malawi.

In 2020, the CCAP Blantyre Synod held a commemorative service at Bemvu, marking 110 years since the beginning of his service. The event was attended by Joyce Banda on behalf of the president.

== Personal life ==
Matecheta married and had children, three of whom died due to malaria. His son Clement, a ranking police officer, wrote a biography of his father in 1970, published in 2026.
