= Jonathan Sangaya =

Leader of church in Blantyre, Malawi

Jonathon Sangaya
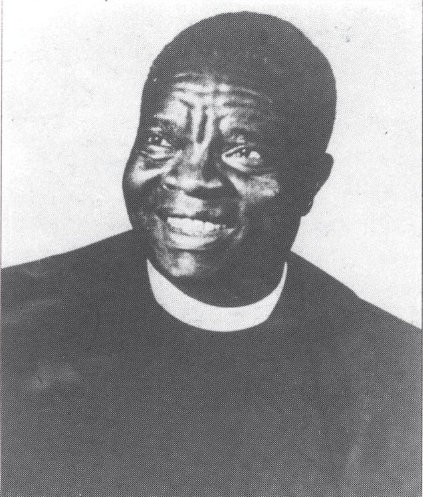
- Born: 31 October 1907; Blantyre
- Died: 22 July 1979 (aged 71)

Jonathon Douglas Sangaya (31 October 1907 – 22 July 1979) was a Malawian leader of the church in Blantyre in Malawi. He was the first African to be the Synod's General Secretary.

== Life ==
Sangaya was born in 1907 in Blantyre near the mission.

He was educated at the Henry Henderson Institute in Blantyre. This was a facility named after a European missionary and run by the mission beside the church that Henry Henderson designed and built in Blantyre. By 1929 Sangaya had qualified as a teacher. In 1930 the Nyasaland department of education awarded him a first class teacher's certificate. He was the first local to be qualified to teach secondary students and for over twenty years he taught at the Blantyre mission.

There was a proposal that the leadership of the church in Africa should be made by Africans. Some Africans were ordained but important positions in the church were all occupied by Europeans. If has been argued that the emergence of African leaders came about because of the ambition of educated Africans, the lack of finance caused by the first world war and the depression and the emergence of Africans who had seen other cultures as they travelled abroad during the second world war. Sangaya was employed as a chaplain. Sergeant Sangaya returned after serving in the war having been commended as a first class instructor in the education of both the Asikari and Europeans.

In 1962 he was elected to be the first African to be the General Secretary of the Blantyre Synod of the Central Africa Presbyterian Church.

He was succeeded as General Secretary of the Synod by his deputy, Silas S Ncozana. Ncozzana served for ten years from 1985 and be wrote Sangaya's biography. Ncozana went on to be an ambassador.

== Private life ==
Before the second world war he married Christian Mtingala and they had seven children.

== Death and legacy ==
Sangaya died in 1979.
