= Persecution of the Tumbuka people =

Historical and modern persecution against the Tumbuka ethnic group

Persecution of the Tumbuka people refers to the historical and continuing discrimination, marginalisation, and violence directed against the Tumbuka people of northern Malawi, eastern Zambia, and parts of southern Tanzania. Although the Tumbuka were once politically and culturally dominant in several regions of pre-colonial Malawi, colonial and post-independence policies have contributed to their systematic exclusion from political representation, education, and economic opportunities.

== Pre-colonial period ==
Before European colonisation, the Tumbuka inhabited large parts of present-day northern Malawi, including the Nkhamanga Kingdom and surrounding areas. These polities were disrupted during the nineteenth century by invasions from the Ngoni people under Zwangendaba, who displaced or absorbed many Tumbuka communities. The Ngoni raids resulted in mass killings, enslavement, and cultural suppression of the Tumbuka, who were forced to adopt Ngoni customs and language in many areas.

== Colonial period ==
Under British colonial rule in the Nyasaland Protectorate, the Tumbuka were initially favoured by missionaries and administrators due to their early adoption of Christianity and literacy through the Livingstonia Mission. However, colonial development policies later concentrated infrastructure, schools, and administrative jobs in the central and southern regions, leaving the north underdeveloped. Many Tumbuka men became migrant labourers in southern Malawi, Rhodesia (now Zimbabwe), and South Africa, where they often faced discrimination and poor working conditions.

== Post-independence discrimination ==
After Malawi gained independence in 1964 under Hastings Kamuzu Banda, political power became centralised in the southern region and dominated by the Chewa ethnic group. Banda’s regime sidelined northern politicians and civil servants, accusing them of regionalism and disloyalty. Educational institutions in the north, such as the Livingstonia Mission schools, were defunded or closed, while university admissions and government appointments increasingly favoured southerners.

Public discussion of ethnic marginalisation was banned under Banda’s one-party state, and many Tumbuka intellectuals and activists were imprisoned or forced into exile. The Tumbuka language itself was banned from radio broadcasting and official education for much of the Banda era, as Chichewa was declared the sole national language in 1968.

== Contemporary issues ==
Although multiparty democracy was introduced in 1994, Tumbuka communities continue to report regional disparities in infrastructure, access to education, and political appointments. The concentration of economic and political power in the south has persisted, with northern Malawi remaining one of the least developed areas of the country.

Modern political movements and civic organisations in northern Malawi have occasionally called for greater federalism or autonomy, arguing that decades of systematic neglect amount to structural persecution. These grievances have been echoed by sections of the diaspora in Zambia and Tanzania, where Tumbuka minorities also face cultural assimilation pressures and limited official recognition.

== Cultural suppression ==
The suppression of the Tumbuka language and culture during the Banda regime had lasting effects. Radio Malawi and the national curriculum excluded Tumbuka-language broadcasts and teaching materials for nearly three decades. Traditional Tumbuka festivals, oral histories, and dances such as the Vimbuza were discouraged or labelled as "pagan" by both state and church authorities until their later recognition by UNESCO as Intangible Cultural Heritage in 2005.

== Legacy ==
The legacy of Tumbuka persecution is reflected in regional inequality, linguistic politics, and ongoing debates about national unity in Malawi. Scholars have argued that the historical marginalisation of the north has contributed to persistent regional voting patterns and underrepresentation of northern elites in national politics. Thal and linguistic revival efforts among younger generations, including digital activism and the promotion of the Tumbuka language in media and education.

== See also ==
- Tumbuka people
- Nkhamanga Kingdom
- Northern Region, Malawi
