= Grace Malenga =

Malawian paediatrician and researcher

- Born: 1947 (age 78–79); Likoma
- Education: University of Bristol and University of Nairobi
- Occupation: Medical Doctor
- Employer: Ministry of Health and Kamuzu University of Health Sciences (KUHeS)
- Known for: said to be Malawi's First Female Doctor
- Board member of: Malawi Medical Council
- Spouse: Edward Malenga

Grace Malenga (born in 1947) is a Malawian paediatrician and researcher. She is the first female Malawian doctor to practice in Malawi. She served as District Health Officer (DHO), regional health director of Southern region and director of Malaria Unit at Kamuzu University of Health and Sciences (KUHES) (formerly, College of Medicine). She also held multiple senior positions as both a clinician and researcher including country health coordinator for United Nations High Commissioner for Refugees (UNHCR) refugee programme. Malenga retired after serving for thirty five years in Malawi.

== Early life ==
Malenga was born on Likoma Island, Malawi. She grew up on the Likoma Island as the eldest child in a family of ten children. As a young person she enjoyed swimming and fishing in Lake Malawi. She also enjoyed time with family and friends at the island. She later left the island to complete both her secondary and tertiary education. She described her experience being away from home as exciting and adventurous.

Malenga is married to Edward Malenga who is an agronomist and they have children together. Her son died aged 18 in a car accident. Her husband, two daughters and extended family are said to have provided important support.

== Education ==
Malenga spent her early secondary school years at Malosa Mission Secondary School in Malosa, Zomba, Malawi. She later obtained her ‘O’ and 'A' level certificates at Blantyre Secondary School in Blantyre, Malawi.

Malenga studied medicine at the University of Bristol in the United Kingdom through a British Council scholarship. She completed her medical degree in 1972. When she returned she was hailed by the press as the first Malawian woman to be a medical doctor, even though she knew she was probably the third. After, working for several years in Malawi, she studied in Kenya for a master's degree in paediatrics at the University of Nairobi.

== Career and contributions ==
Upon returning to Malawi after completing her medical degree, she served at several districts in Southern Malawi including Chikwawa and Mulanje as DHO. After her postgraduate studies, she continued working as DHO in Mulanje. In 1988, she moved to Blantyre to take on the role of regional health officer for Southern Region in Malawi. She later served as the country Health Coordinator for the UNHCR for Mozambican civil war refugees in Malawi. During her work with the UNHCR, she conducted medical research and investigated health conditions affecting the refugee population in Malawi.

Malenga later worked at Queen Elizabeth Central Hospital and KUHES where she held several senior roles. She was director of the Malaria Alert Centre, at KUHES in Blantyre. She served at several roles at Malawi Medical Council including secretary and chair of the Malawi Medical Council.

Malenga has conducted research and published on Malaria challenges in Malawi . She also served on several advisory boards on Malaria both locally and internationally including member of Malaria Advisory Group at Against Malaria Foundation.

Malenga retired in 2007 after serving for 35 years. She had chosen to spend her career in Malawi. despite lucrative offers to work abroad. After retirement she relocated to NKhotakota to live with rural communities and study their understanding of health and medicine.

== See also ==
- Vida Mungwira
