= Catherine Chipembere =

Malawian gender activist and politician

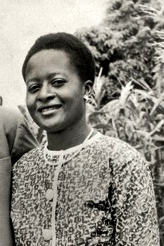
- from her wedding photograph to Masauko Chipembere
- Born: Catherine Ajizinga; 1935 (age 90–91); Domasi
- Education: University of California at Los Angeles
- Occupation: politician
- Known for: Government minister in 1994

Catherine Mary Ajizinga Chipembere (b 1935) is a Malawian gender activist and politician. She was elected as the first female member of the Malawian parliament. She was the wife of Malawian nationalist Henry Masauko Chipembere and is the mother of the jazz artist Masauko Chipembere Jr. She was exiled to the US from Malawi together with her husband, and later returned to Malawi and was the first woman elected to Malawi Parliament. She worked with AIDS orphans and ran twelve pre-schools, serving more than 1,000 AIDS orphans. She also runs a women's knitting cooperative in Mangochi.

== Early life ==
Chipembere was born in Domasi in 1935 in Malawi. Her father was a teacher. She met her future husband when they both attended Blantyre Secondary School during a time when education was not considered a priority for Malawian girls. She won a scholarship to study domestic science at Bath Domestic Science College in England. She met and married the Malawi nationalist Henry Masauko Chipembere in 1957 when she returned to Malawi. He became a leading activist and she helped other women make clothes as part of developing the community. She fled with their seven children to the United States under exile, after the dictatorial Kamuzu Banda severed their relationship with her husband. Masauko Chipembere died in the United States in 1975 from diabetes. Chipembere went on to pursue and earn a bachelor's degree in early childhood education from the University of California at Los Angeles. She also operated a childcare facility in her home and raised her own children.

== Political life ==
Catherine Chipembere was exiled from Malawi together with her husband and they lived outside the country for 29 years. In 1994, after the end of Banda's rule, she returned to Malawi as a hero. She was elected as the first female member of the Malawian parliament. Later she served as the first deputy minister of education, science and technology and then as deputy minister of health and population. She was able to use her degree to oversee primary and secondary school education.

She retired from her political career in 1998 and started the "Women's Initiative Network". In a widely publicised move, she decided to keep her husband's surname in spite of remarrying, as a political statement. She was sued by the Chipembere family for maintaining her Chipembere surname. Although ultimately winning the case, Catherine was removed from her post and residence in the government sector in 1998 by the Muluzi government.

== Women's Initiative Network ==
The Women's Initiative Network (WIN) is a non-profit network of Malawian women that holds empowerment workshops for young women which are led by her. The network collaborated with non-profit organisations like Global Soles in the US to bring shoes for orphans in Malawi in 2009. WIN Malawi operates in rural Mangochi and has built and sponsored twelve primary schools that educate, feed and care for over a thousand orphans. Most of the children are between two and six years old. Several of the orphans are AIDS orphans.

== Personal life ==
In what ensued as a public scandal and a celebrated court case, the Chipembere clan sued Catherine for maintaining her Chipembere surname, though she remarried. She won this case and she was able to keep the surname as a political widow.

She has seven children, including jazz musician Masauko Chipembere Jr.
