= Domasi =

- Location in Malawi
- Coordinates: 15°16′37″S 35°23′56″E
- Country: Malawi
- Region: Southern Region
- District: Zomba District
- Time zone: UTC+2
- Climate: Cwa

Domasi is a community in Malawi to the northeast of Zomba. It is the location of the Institute of Education, the Museum of Education, Domasi College of Education, and a prison. As of 2025, the prison has about 260 inmates.

The Domasi Institute of Management and Technology was founded in 2019. In 2024, over 200 students graduated, including a "good number" of women. Their courses included the management of agribusiness, data, health, human resources, hotels, and hospitality. Other courses included community development and social work, nutrition, and food security and sustainable development. At commencement, graduates were warned of the few jobs in government and encouraged to create rather than look for jobs.

== History ==
Teacher trainees rebuilding a barn in 1967

In 1883 the missionary Alexander Hetherwick began his career in Africa; he opened a mission in Domasi in 1884. After he went on furlough at the same time as ex-missionary Elizabeth Chisholm in 1888, she visited him there after their return. They married in 1893, and girls from Domasi walked the 50 miles to Blantyre to attend their wedding, which they shared with two other couples.

The Shallow Well Project funded by the First Presbyterian Church of Urbana in Urbana, Illinois, United States provided safe drinking water for the villages around Domasi in 2004. The project installed 68 wells, serving about 36,000 people, but in 2025 the borehole water supplying the college failed and the students began using river water.

== Notable people ==
Catherine Chipembere was born here in 1930. She was elected as the first female member of the Malawian parliament.
