= St Michael and All Angels Church, Blantyre =

Church in Malawi

Coordinates: 15°47′02.71″S 35°01′14.54″E

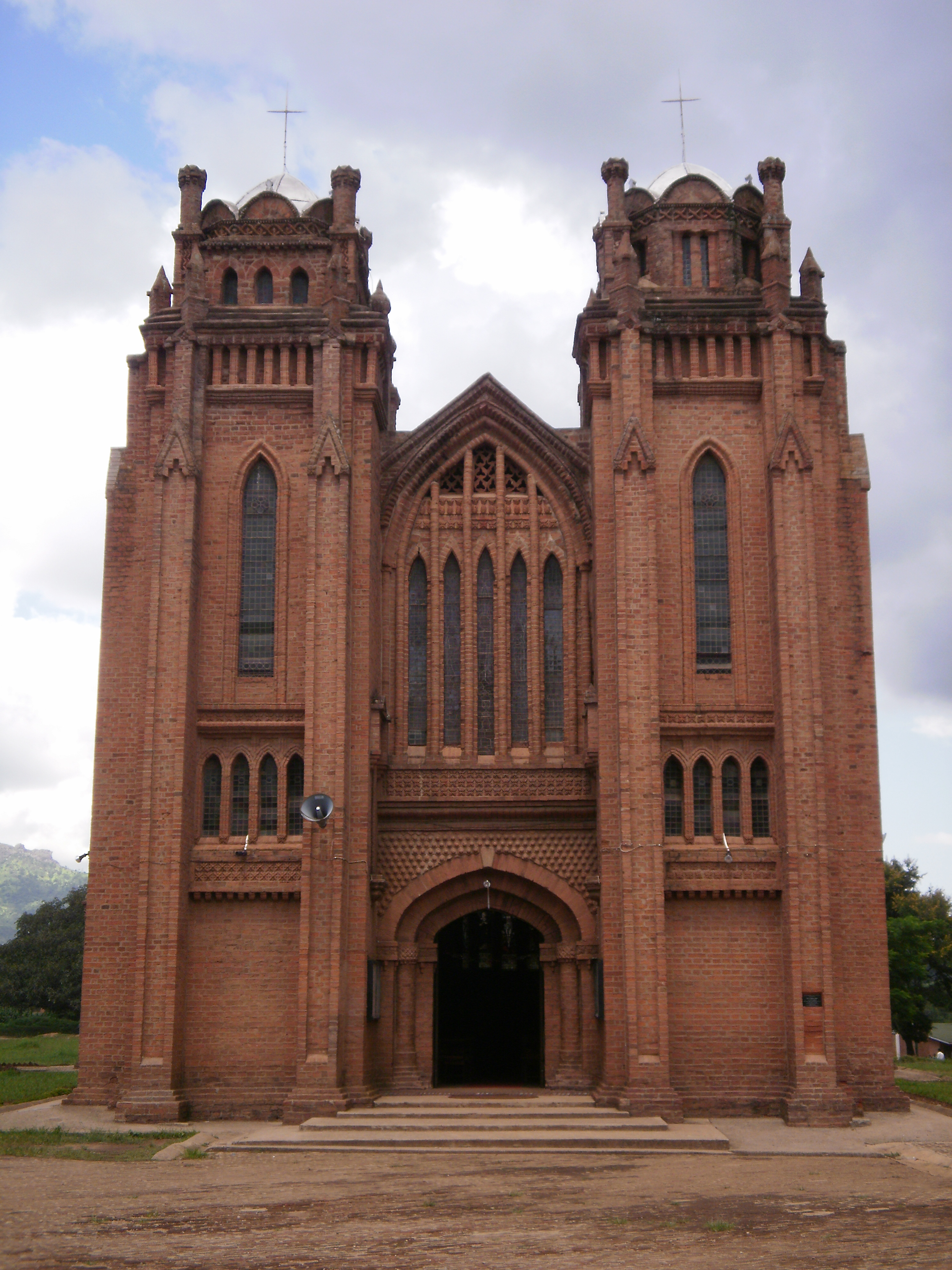
West-facing facade

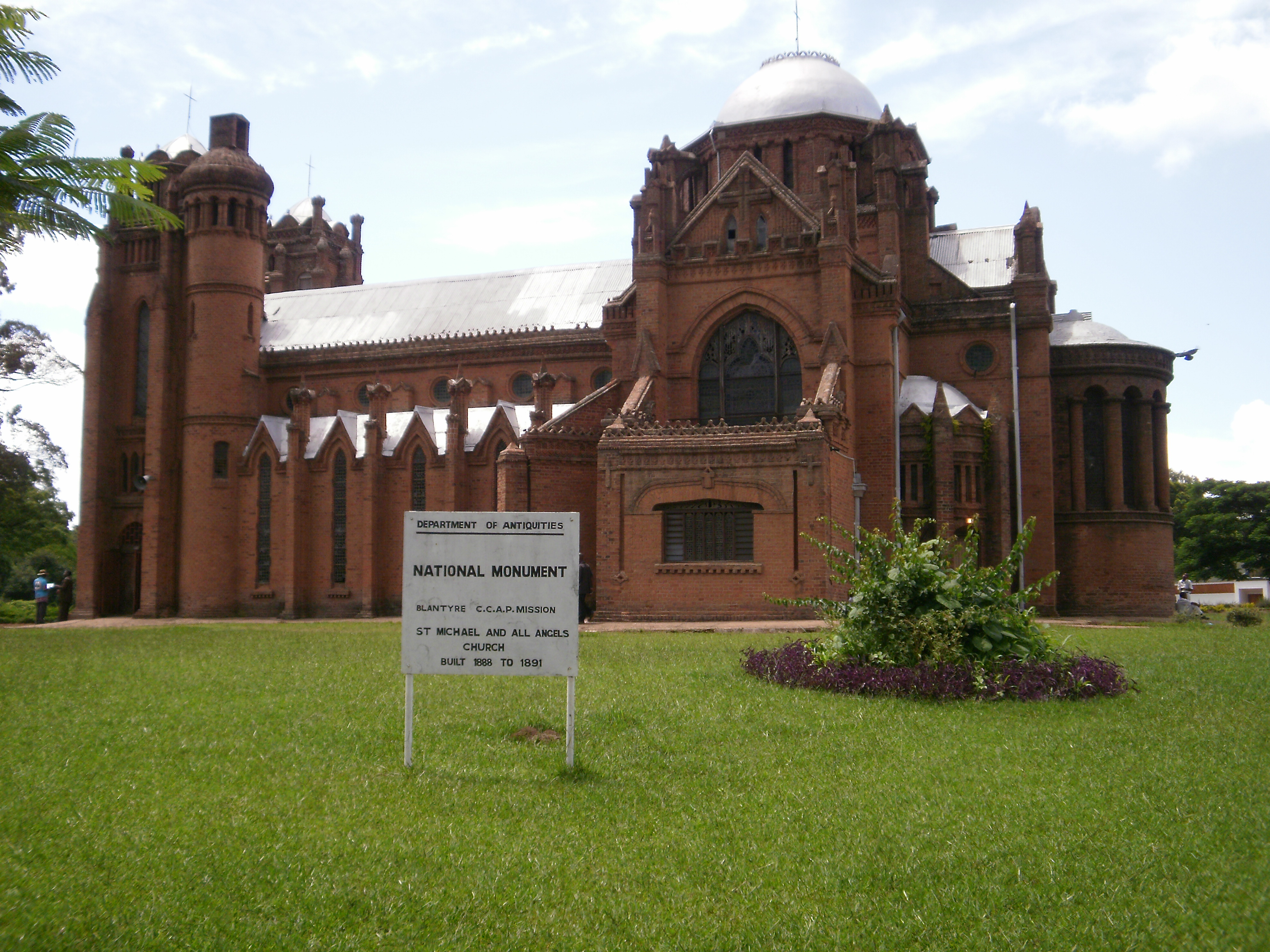
South side of St Michael and All Angels Church

St. Michael and All Angels Church is a church that was constructed from 1888 to 1891 of brick at the Blantyre Mission in Blantyre, Malawi. It is located on the original British mission site, off Chileka Rd, and is in the Church of Central Africa, Presbyterian’s Blantyre Synod. Since 1991, it has been partnered with Hiland Presbyterian Church in Pittsburgh, Pennsylvania. In 1885, Lieutenant H. E. O'Neil determined the longitude of Blantyre to be 2 hours 20 minutes 13.56 seconds east of Greenwich by means of a series of 365 sets of lunar observations, and a plaque installed in the side of the church commemorates this achievement. The church has been described as

the first permanent Christian Church erected ... between the Zambezi and the Nile. – Rev. Alexander Hetherwick C.B.E., D.D., F.R.G.S.

== Construction ==
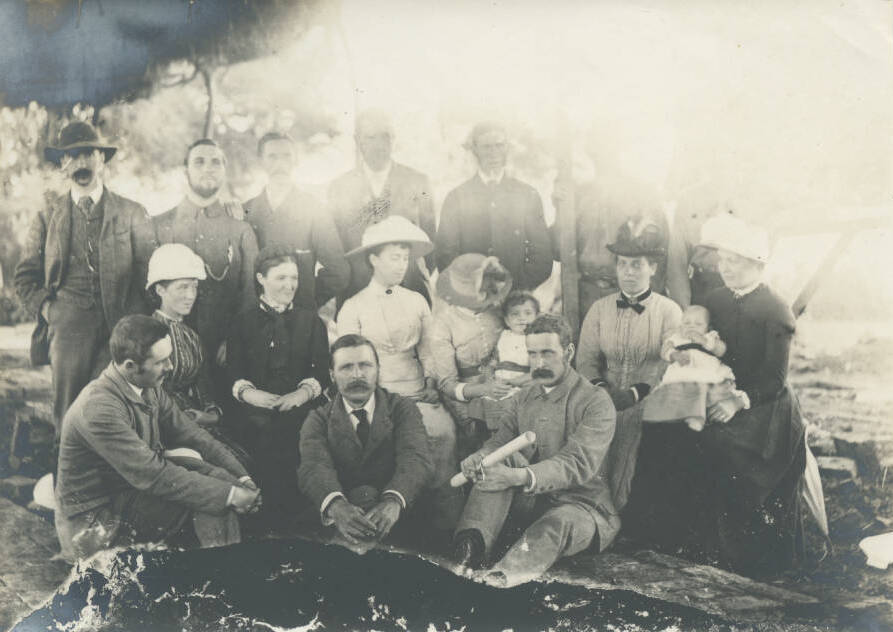
Laying the foundations of Blantyre church in November 1888. Dr. John Bowie is the one standing on the left with a hat. Grace Walker, front left on ground, Harriet Henderson is thought to be the one studying her baby. At the front:Rev. Robt. Cleland, at the centre is John Buchanan, next to him Rev. David Clement Scott then (behind) Janet S. Beck.

The church was designed, and its construction managed, by Rev. David Clement Scott, who had no formal architectural training. Labour was provided by local men without previous experience in this type of construction. All the bricks used were made on-site from local clay and fired in wood-fuelled kilns. It is estimated that eighty-one different forms of bricks were used in the building. The most common bricks are 12 by 6 by 3 inches, laid up in English bond.

Scott made no detailed drawings before construction began. Instead, each detail was tested with dry bricks before final assembly. The dimensions are approximately 106 feet long, 30 feet wide from aisle wall to aisle wall, and 37 feet high to the crest of the roof. Scott described his plan thus:

The form was a Latin cross with very short transepts, (10 feet outside measurement). A short choir, (12 feet outside measurement), and a semi-circular apse of 8 feet radius. The aim was to make a comely Presbyterian place of worship.

The design and structural elements include arches, domes, and flying buttresses. The two towers are not identical. A Moorish, domed bell tower, which contains a circular staircase, is built into the angle between the south-western tower and the wall of the south aisle. The interior consists of a Byzantine arcade of six arches.

== Modifications and renovations ==
An organ was installed in the North transept in 1907, and electric light was installed in 1912. The organ was replaced in 1954. The church underwent renovations in the 1970s, but has changed little in appearance since it was built. A large crack was found and repaired with flitch plates and turnbuckles.

== Surroundings ==
The church building itself is accompanied by a clock tower, about 30 metres to the north, and is surrounded by additional buildings that at one time housed a school, a hospital, a printing press, and a carpentry shop. The grounds now include both a modern multi-purpose hall and the Henry Henderson Institute, named in honour of the British missionary Henry Henderson (1843–91).

== Gallery ==
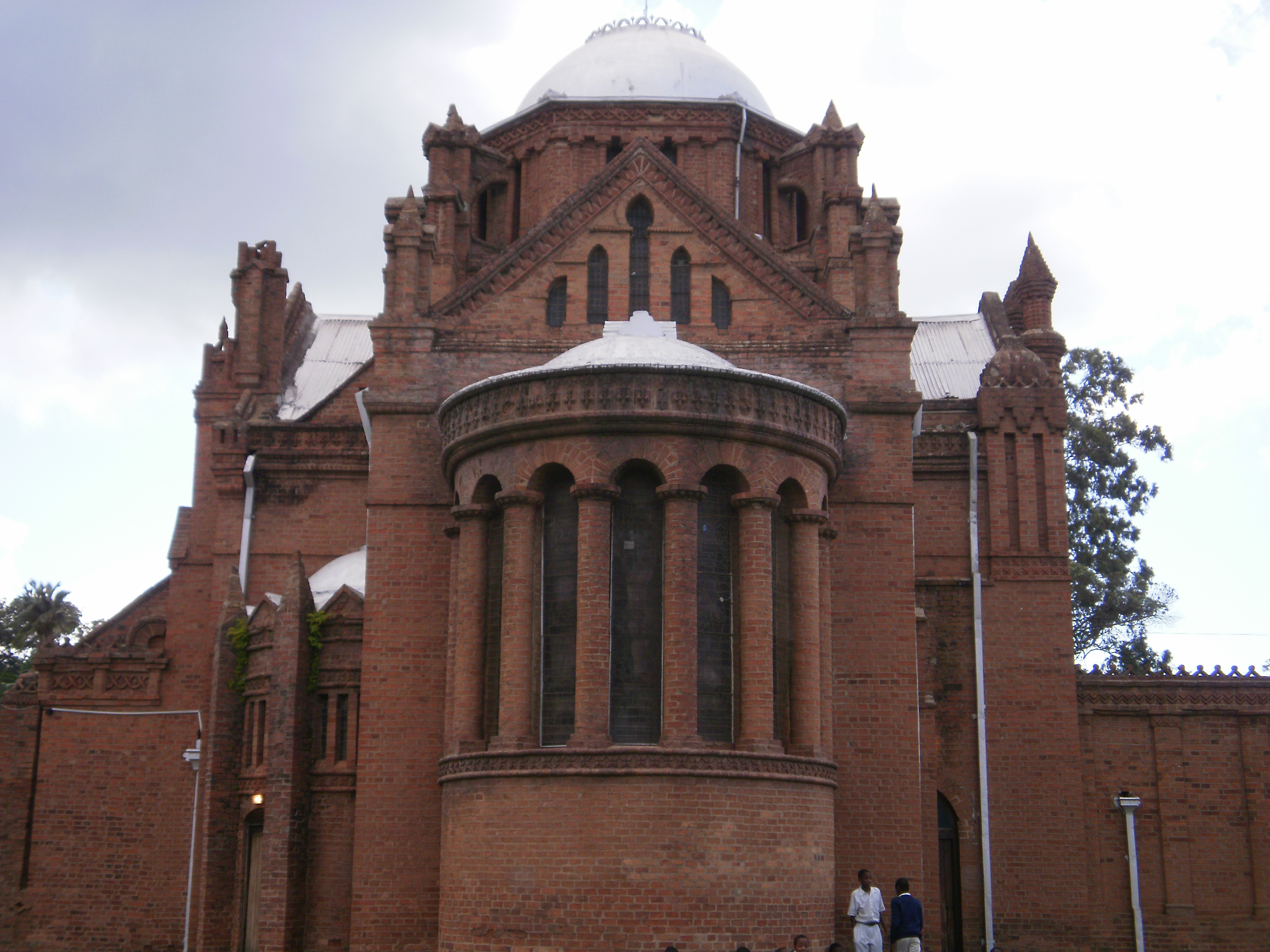
East end with semi-circular apse

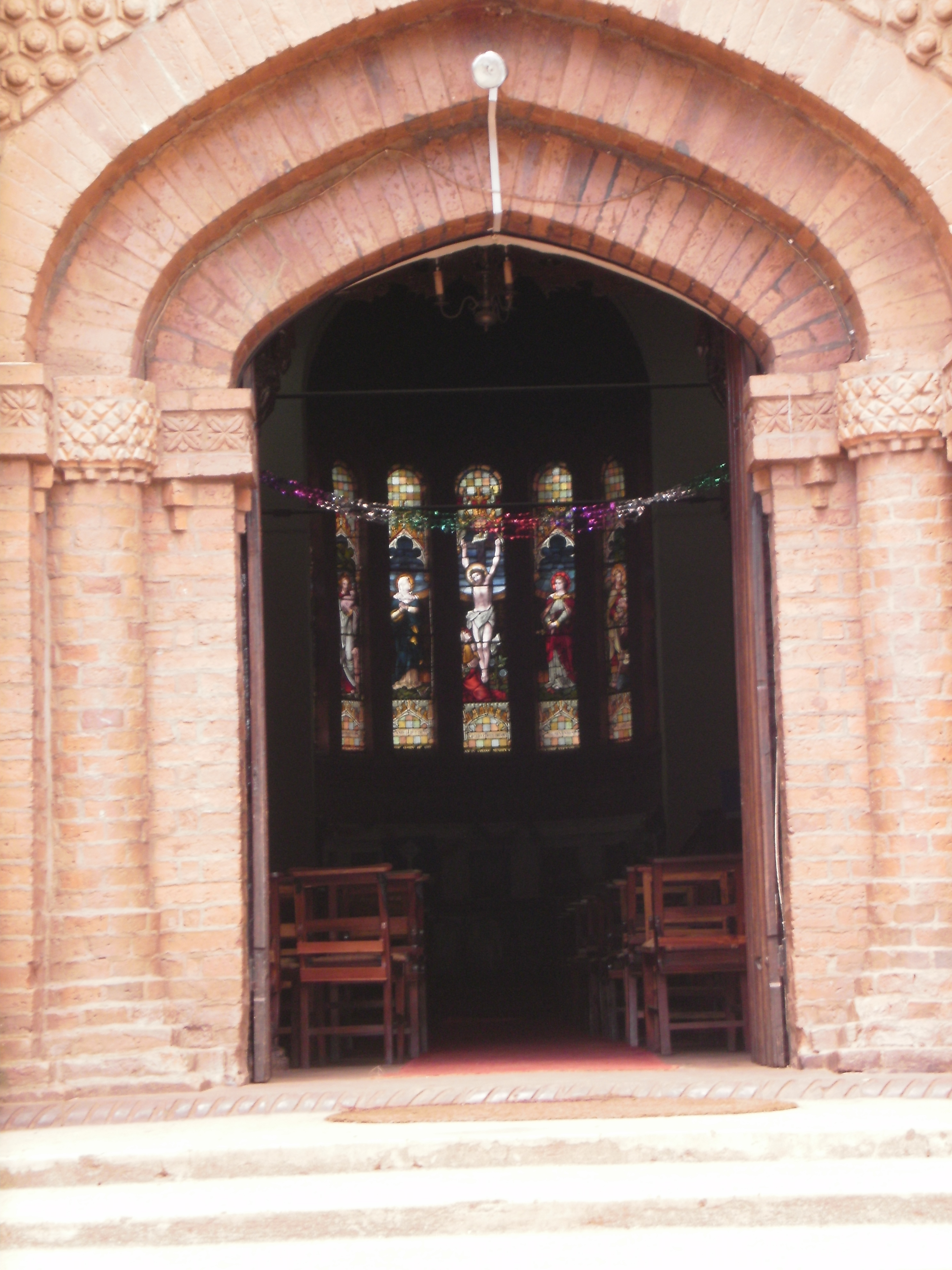
Stained glass in the apse as seen through door in facade

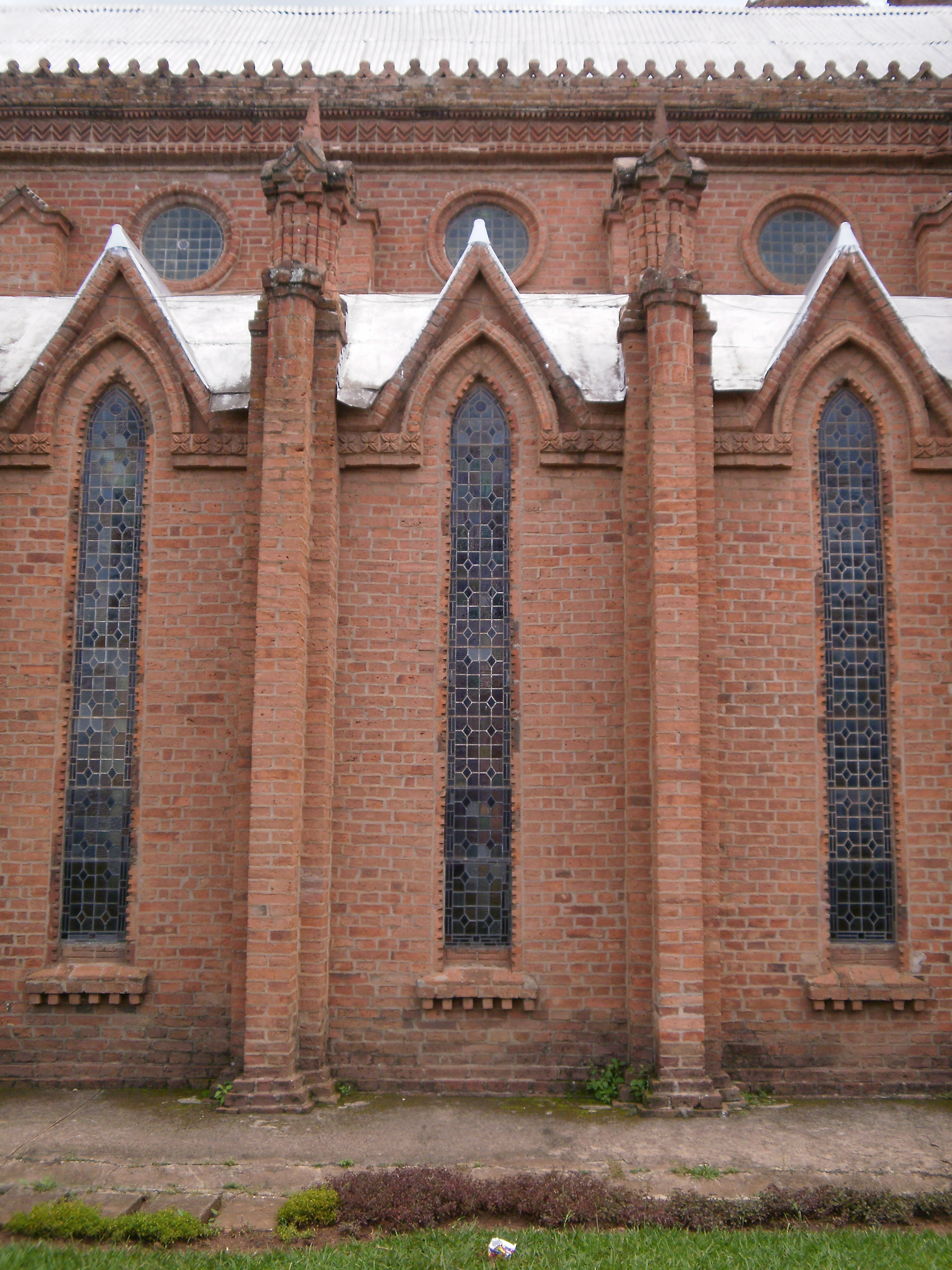
North side detail

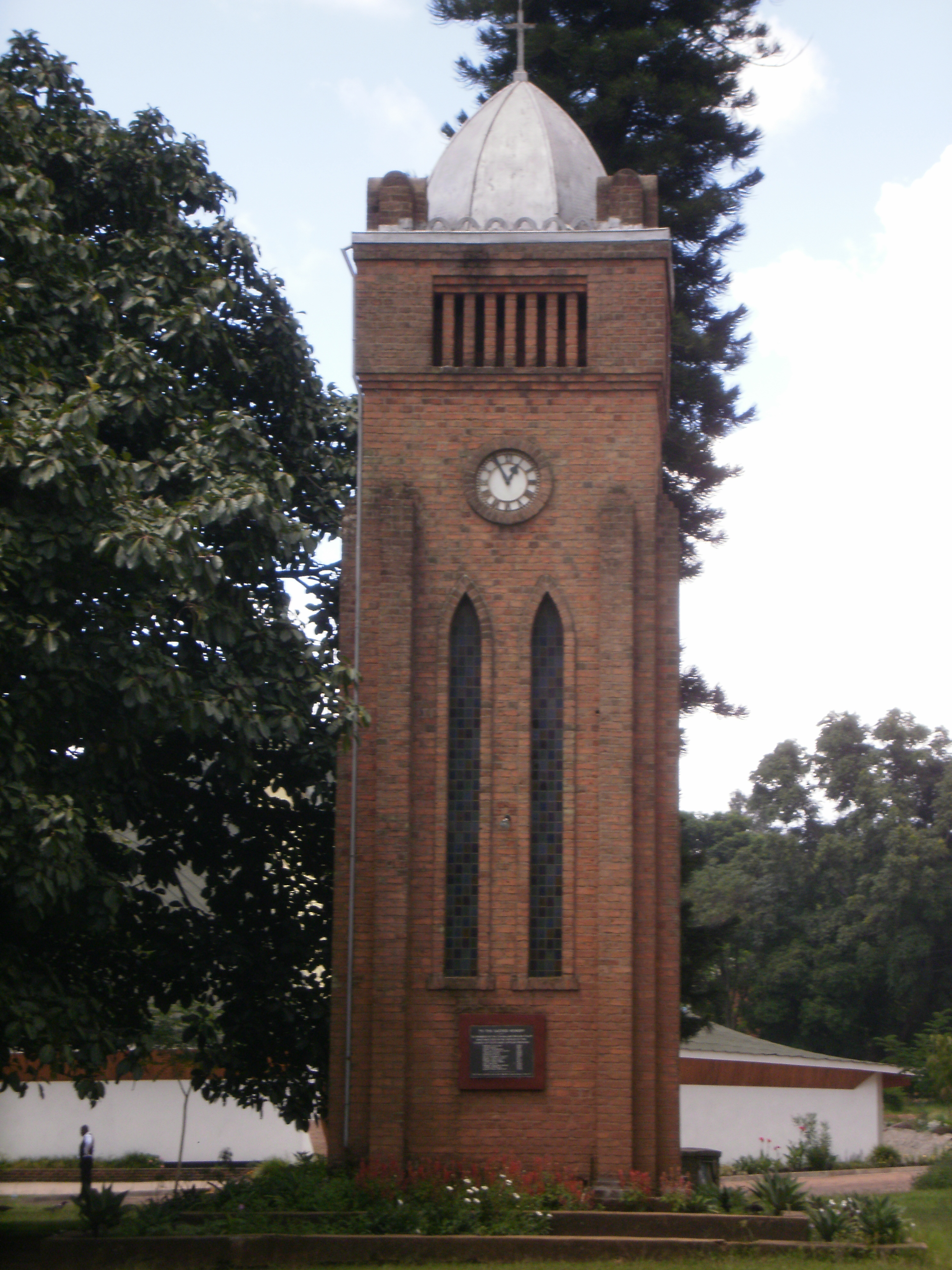
Clock tower

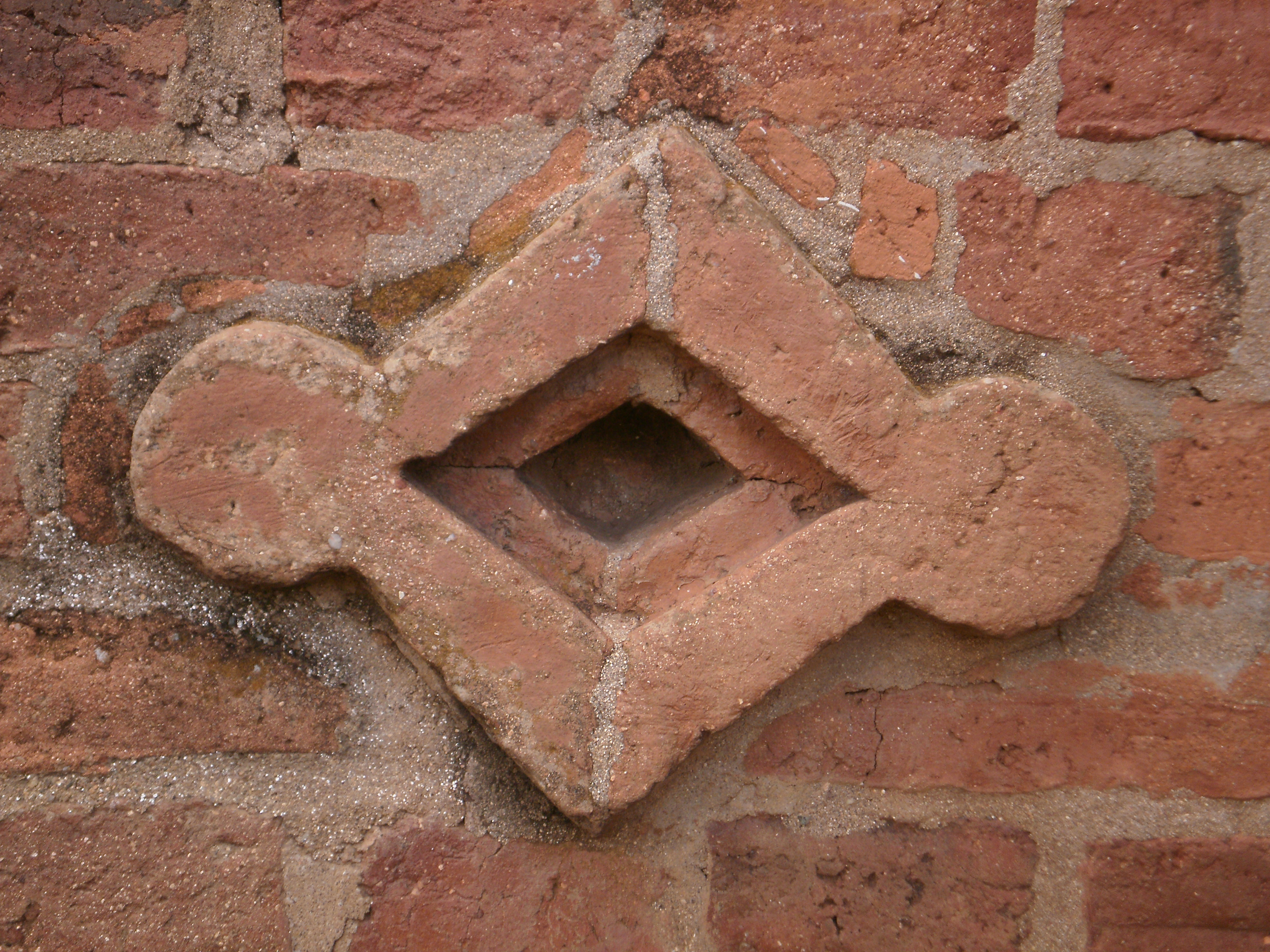
Brick detail

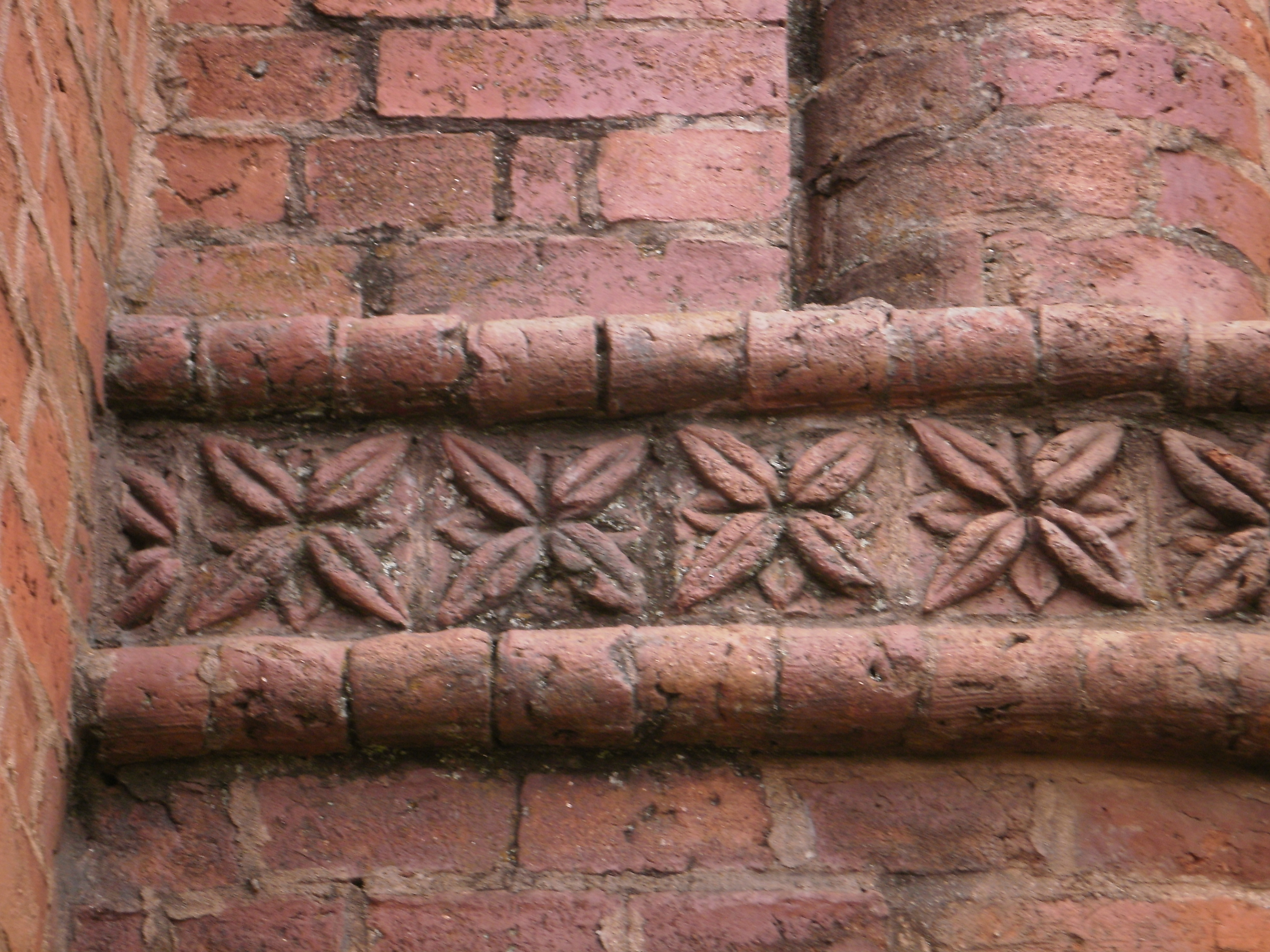
Brick detail

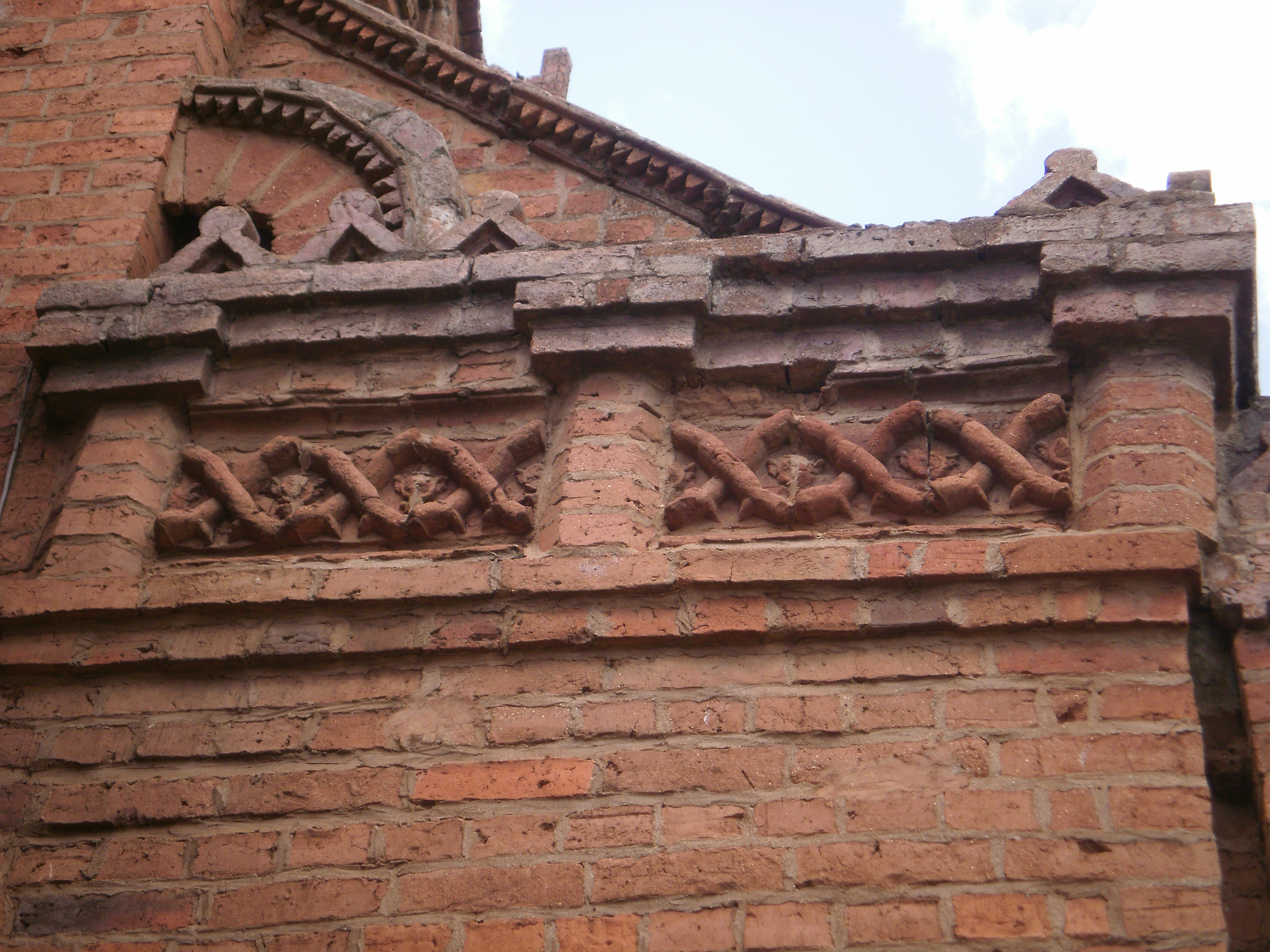
Brick detail

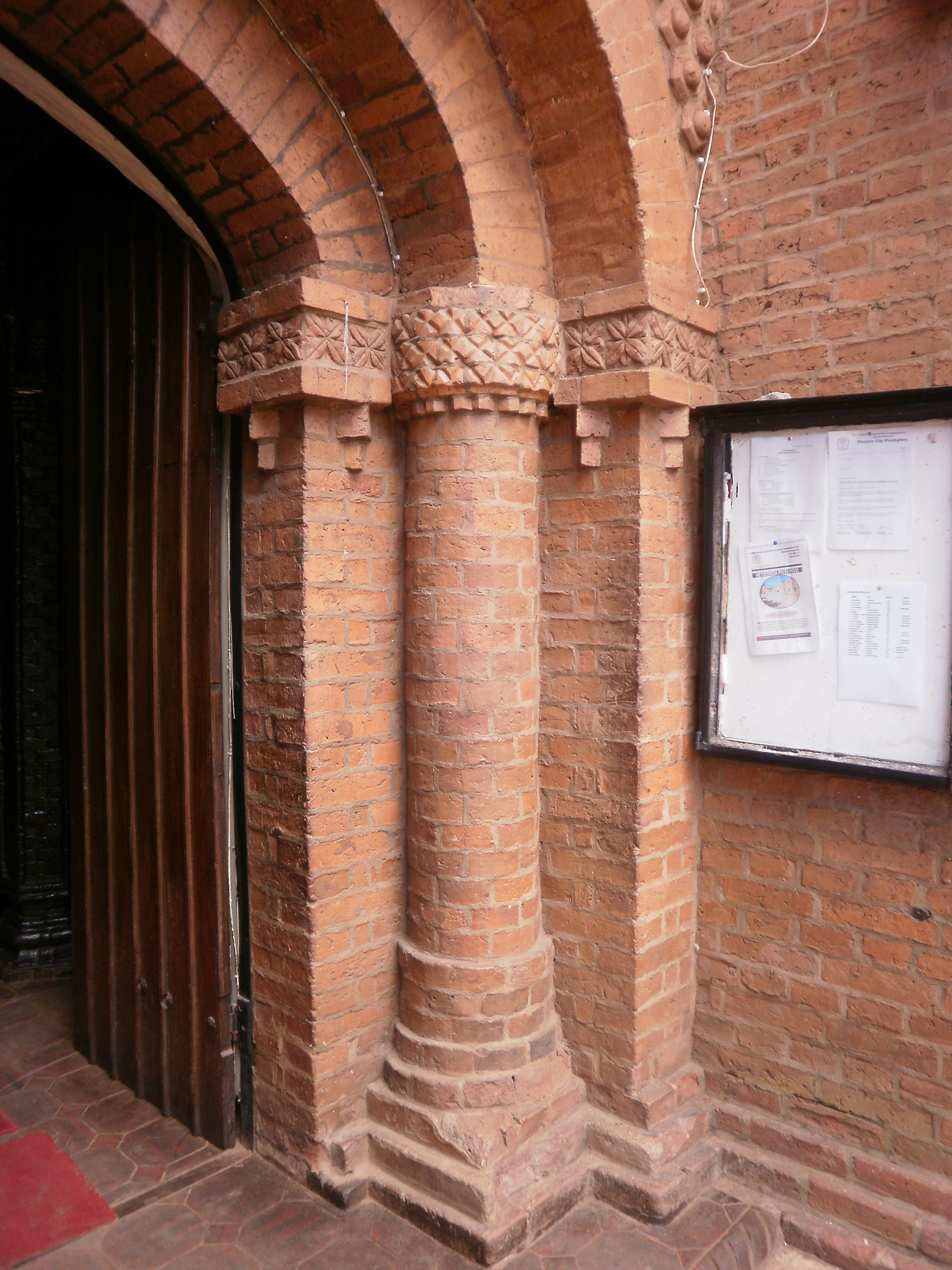
Brick detail

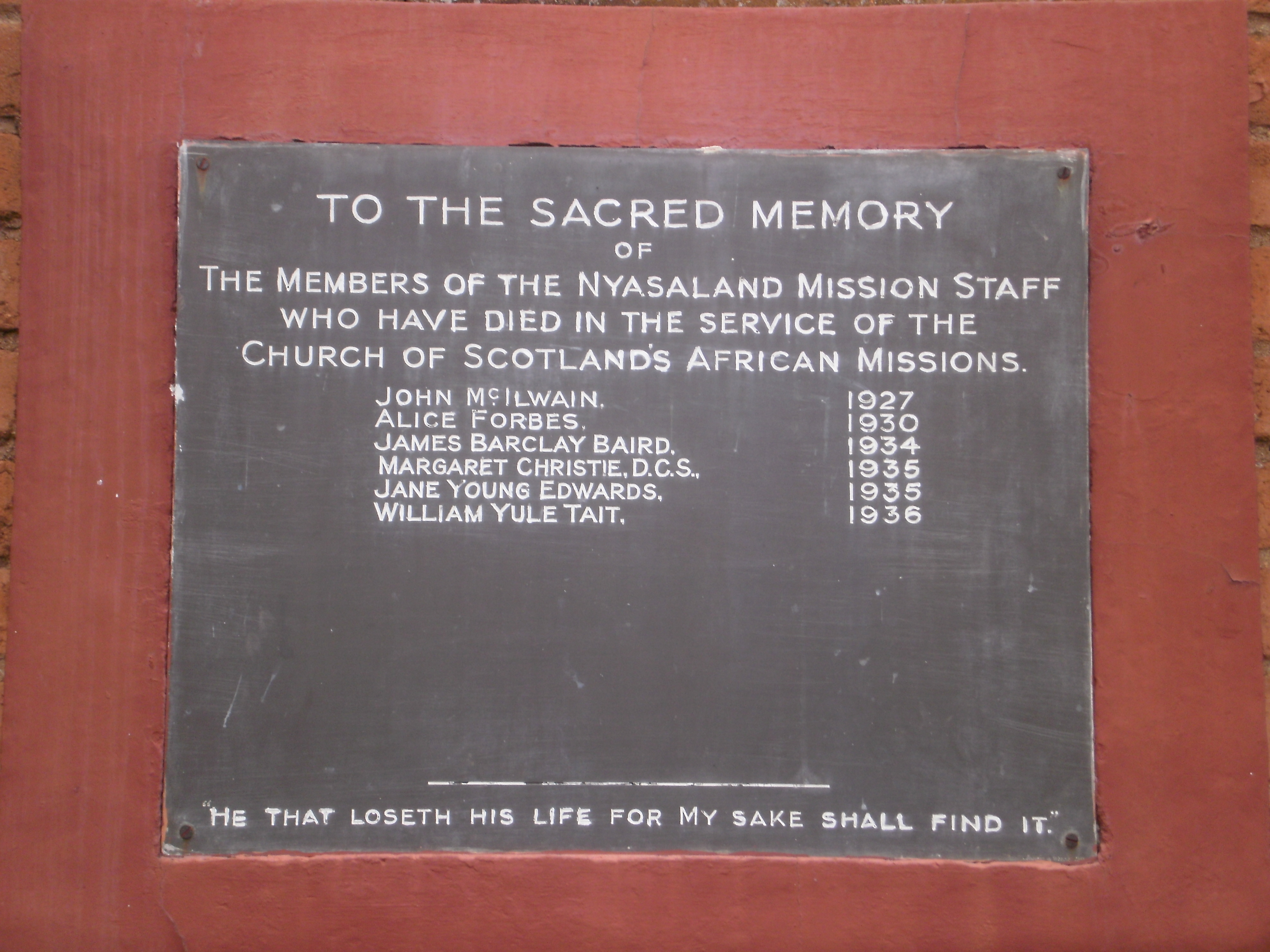
Plaque on clock tower

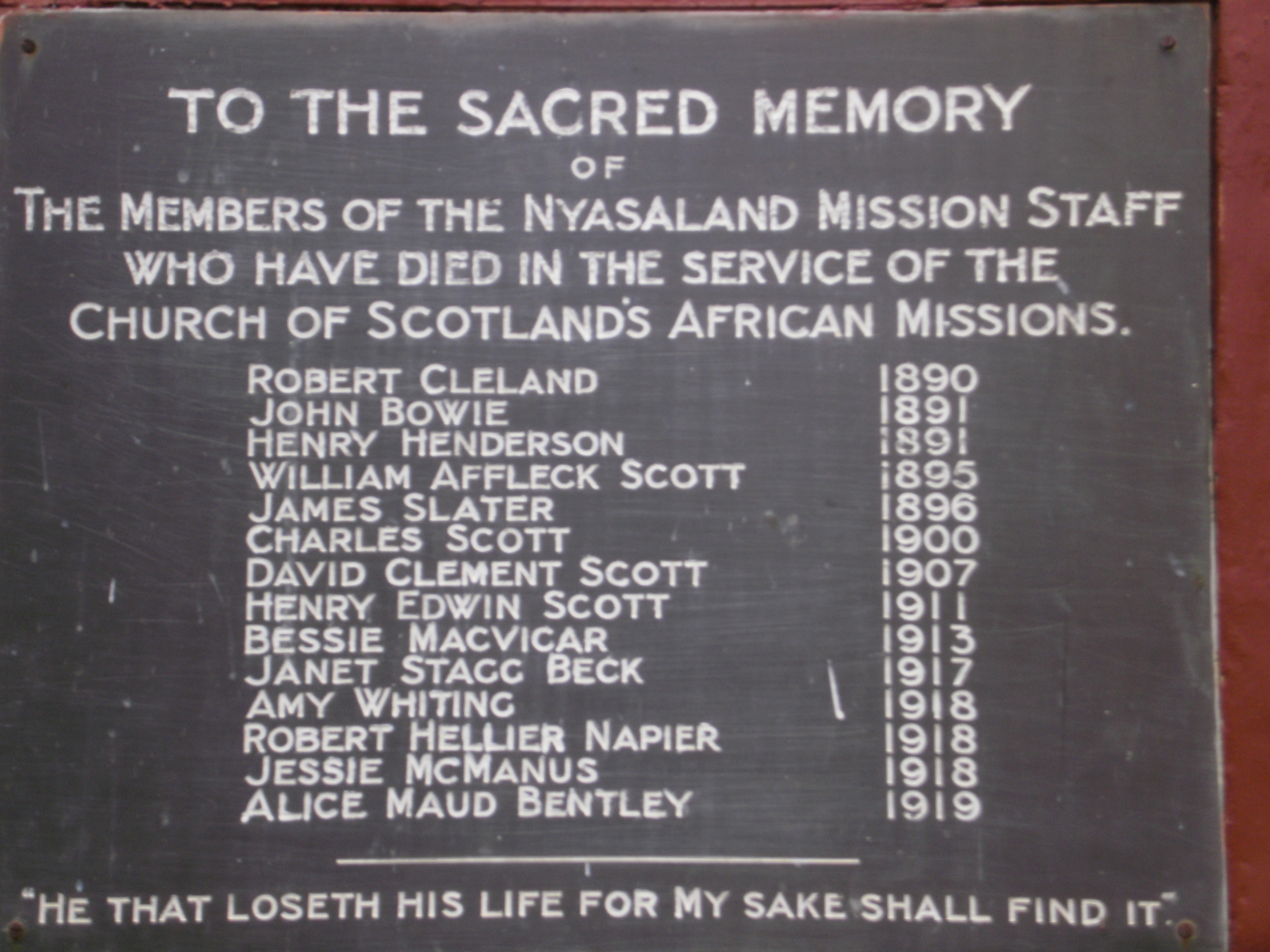
Plaque on clock tower

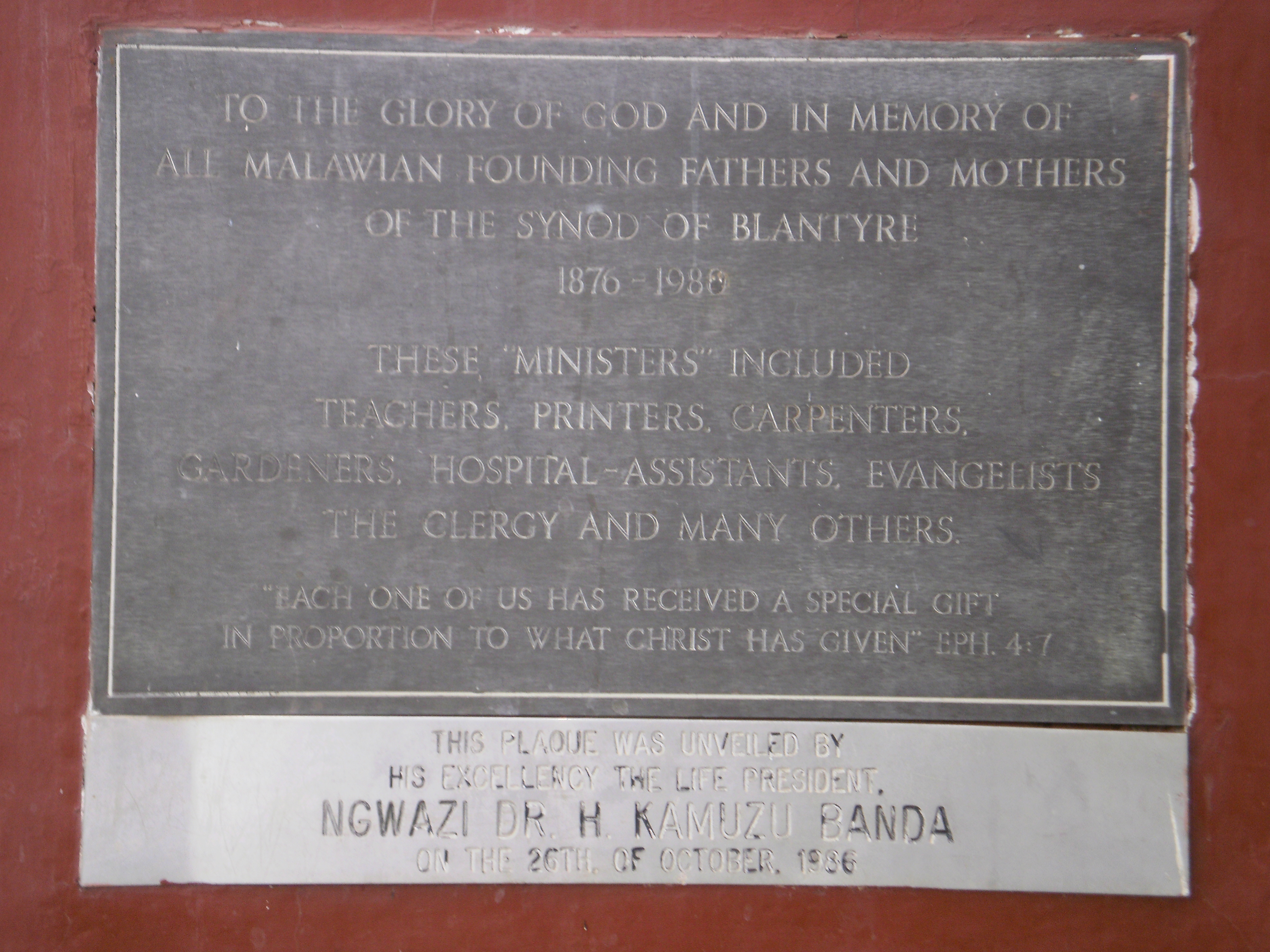
Plaque on clock tower

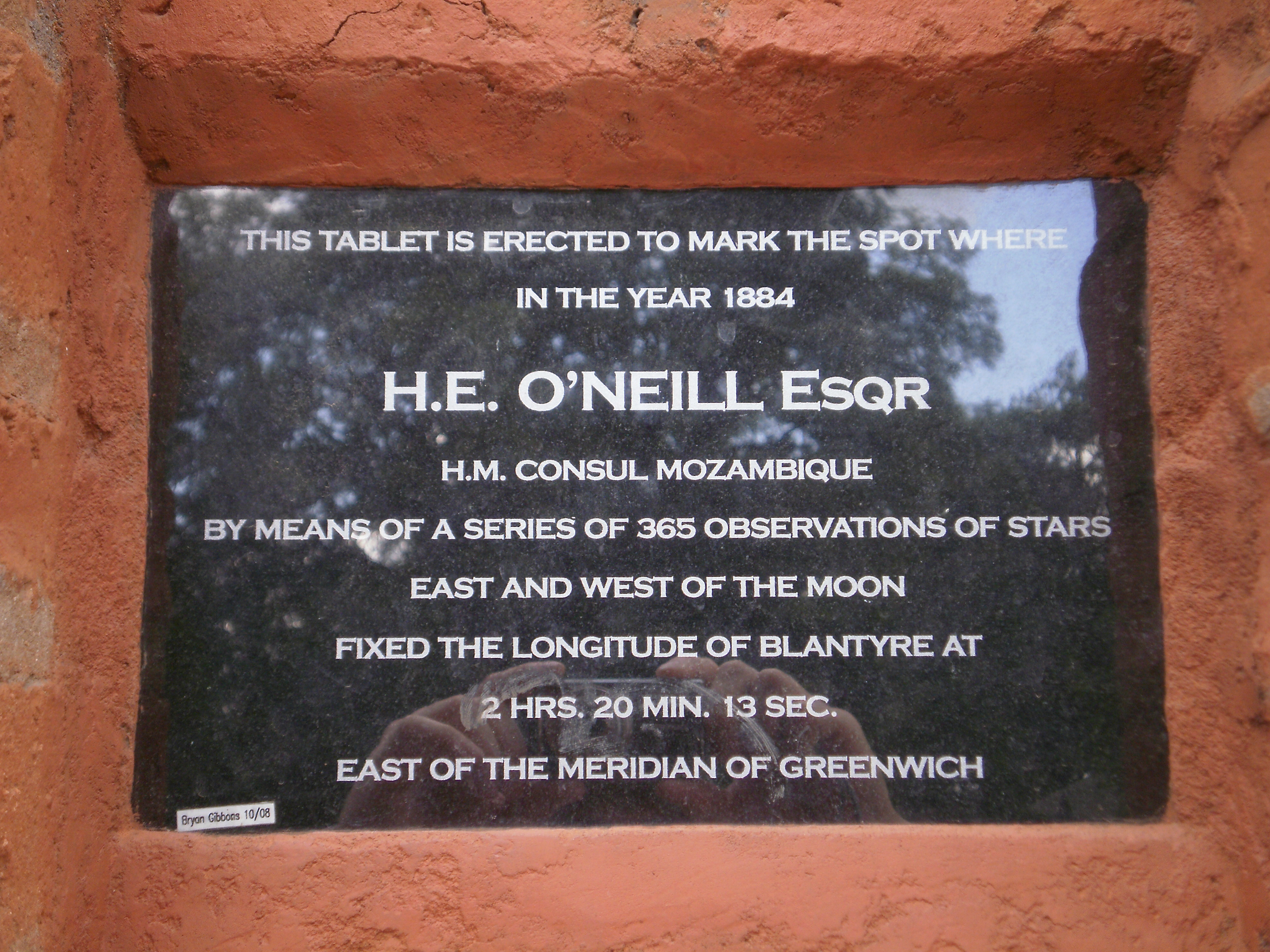
Plaque on front
