= Blk Sonshine =

Blk Sonshine is a jazz duo featuring Malawian-born Masauko Chipembere and the South African Neo Muyanga.

== Formation ==
The group was formed when Chipembere, who had been raised in the United States, traveled to South Africa to explore its jazz traditions, uniting with Muyanga to produce an album under Russell Pope. Released in 1998, their eponymous album was distributed by Fresh Records and BMC Music, achieving particular success in South Africa, where it peaked at number 6 and launched the #1 single, "Building." Their follow-up album, Good Life, was recorded internationally and released in 2009.

Muyanga and Chipembere do not live in the same country and pursue their own solo projects, but they continue to collaborate as Blk Sonshine, including live performances and guest appearances, such as on an upcoming album with RZA of the Wu-Tang Clan. Chimpembre is the son of Catherine Chipembere.

== Songs ==
- Borders
- Soul Smile
- Building
- Agitation
- Born in a taxi

== Discography ==
- Blk Sonshine - 1998, highest position: 20 weeks on Top 20, highest position was 6 on charts.
- Good Life - 2009 (Sony/BMG)
