= Lake Shirwa =

Lake in Mozambique

- Location within Mozambique
- Coordinates: 15°12′S 35°50′E
- Basin countries: Mozambique

Lake Shirwa is a lake located in Mozambique. It was discovered in 1859 by the Scottish explorer, David Livingstone.
