= Elizabeth Hetherwick =

Scottish missionary and teacher in colonial Malawi

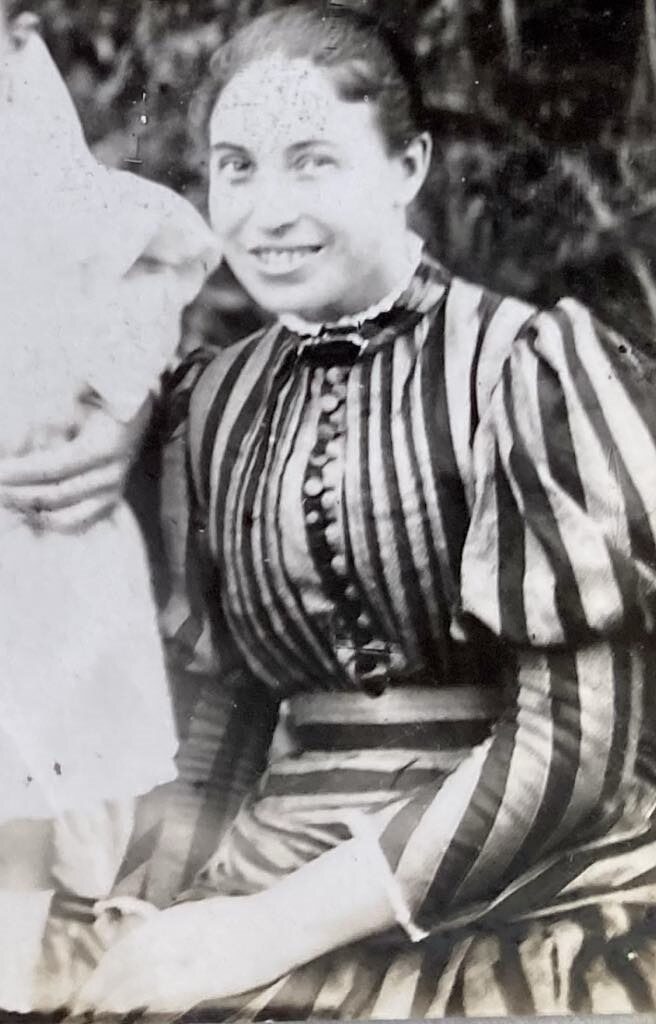
- Mrs Hetherwick
- Born: Elizabeth Barclay Pithie; 18 March 1861; Aberdeen
- Died: 13 February 1945 (aged 83); Edinburgh
- Other name: Elizabeth Fenwick
- Education: Aberdeen Industrial school
- Occupations: missionary and teacher
- Employer: Foreign Mission Committee of the Church of Scotland
- Known for: orphan, missionary, wife of murderer, leading missionary
- Spouse(s): George Fenwick, Alexander Hetherwick
- Children: four (two survived)

Elizabeth Hetherwick born Elizabeth Barclay Pithie also known as Elizabeth Fenwick (18 March 1861 – 1945) was an unmarried orphaned teenager who became a Scottish-born missionary in Malawi. She married a man accused of cruelty and torture and they had, and lost, two children. Her hot-tempered husband was fired from two different jobs and he was killed after he murdered his business partner, who was a tribal chief. The family of the chief demanded that his wife should be surrendered, but she was taken in by the mission at Blantyre. The man who had taken her in was later replaced for championing the rights of women and Africans. Hetherwick married his successor and they moved into the manse. Hetherwick returned alone to Scotland to supervise her children's education. She was eventually reunited with her husband for the last decade of his life.

== Life ==
Elizabeth Barclay Pithie was born in Aberdeen in 1861 and within a fortnight she was in a one parent family after her seaman father, James, was killed in an accident. Her mother, Isabella, was a shopkeeper and a weaver, and died when Elizabeth was young. Elizabeth is then believed to have been a student at the Industrial School in Aberdeen. Elizabeth was chosen as a prospective missionary in Blantyre in what is now Malawi. The mission did not accept single women or children but they were short of recruits and a group of well-wishers, led by Dr. Thomas Farquhar agreed to pay her wages. As a result she was sent out to Blantyre accompanied by Mr and Mrs Milne.

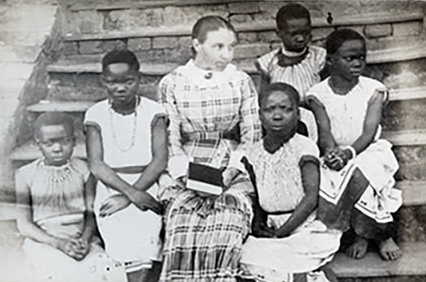
A young Elizabeth Pithie with students

The journey there was not easy. Janet S. Beck, who arrived later, started with a long voyage to Quelimane in what is now Mozambique followed by an 80 mile journey up the River Quaqua, a steamer up the Zambezi to the River Shire, and then a 28 mile trek. Elizabeth was not well received when she arrived. The inaugural leader of the mission, Duff Macdonald, whose main interest was linguistics, refused to accept her as a teacher, even though that was the reason she had been sent. She was given other work to do instead. The mission consisted of eight buildings which included the store and the school. The authority was administered largely by Dr Thomas Macklin, John Buchanan, George Fenwick and John Walker. The mission took in enslaved escapees which did not improve relations with the local Yao chief. The results of the poor relationship included arbitrary and cruel violence and Elizabeth at one point slept with eight small girls when a raid was expected. Her closest friends were the Milne couple until they left, with regret, after falling out with Duff Macdonald.

== Cruelty and marriage ==
In 1880 Dr Rankin arrived to find out about the cruelties that had been reported. Cruel whippings of the innocent had been accompanied by killing a man found guilty of murder - by repeated gunfire wounds. Regrettably, Rankin conducted a wedding between Elizabeth and George Fenwick. Fenwick was 27 and he was described as an adventurer and not a missionary. Scott believed that Fenwick gave the mission a poor reputation as he would go drinking at the mission with Chief Chipatula. He was cruel and his interest was in making money and gathering support with the locals. Rankin's enquiry revealed sufficient evidence to sack John Buchanan, John Walker and her husband. They were offered free passage home if they left within two months. They didn't. Her husband decided to become an elephant hunter for the African Lakes Corporation and Elizabeth went to live in a nearby village named Mandala.

At Christmas 1888, her hot-tempered husband decided to threaten his boss, John Moir, with a gun, and he was out of work again. Her husband then set himself up as an ivory trader leveraging his friendship with the local chief Chipatula who was based in Mbewe. Ivory was a lucrative trade and her husband was setting himself up in competition with the existing and rival exporters.

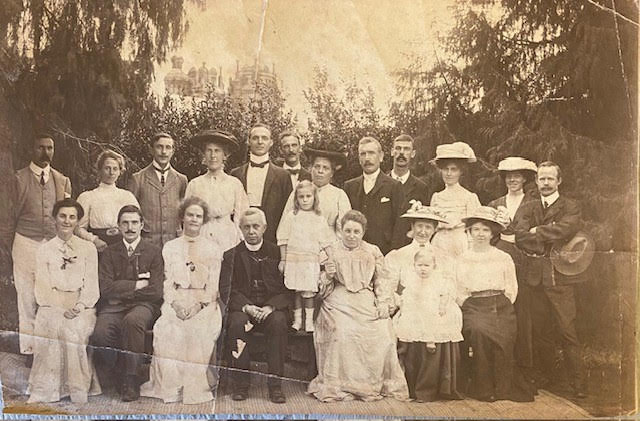
Blantyre missionaries: L to R Back Row:Frank Bowman, Mrs McFarland, Mr and Mrs Currie, Mr Armitage, Mr Wyllie, Miss Beck, Stuart Bowman, Mrs ???, Miss Priest, Mr Baird. L to R Front Row:Miss ?ow?, Mr R M McFarland, Miss McNab, Alexander Hetherwick. May Hetherwick (child standing), Elizabeth Hetherwick, Mrs Burnett (and Ian in front), Miss Anna Fange?

== Widow ==
Elizabeth was ill after her second child was born and this was followed by the death of her first child; and then that of her second. In 1884 her husband hired a crew to transport ivory and oil seeds to Quelimane. When he returned his partner Chipatul was unhappy with his share and her husband resolved the dispute by killing him. Her husband head's next appearance was on a stake in Mbewe. He had been hunted down by Chipatul's followers, killed and beheaded. The results also included a raid on the Africa Lakes Company. The village of Mandala prepared itself for an attack and Bella and David Clement Scott took the brave decision to take in Elizabeth. He had said that if there was a fight then the mission would retreat to Zomba. An initial demand for compensation for Chipatul's death was that all of Fenwick's possessions should be surrendered and that included Elizabeth.

Chipatul's son, Chikusi, then sank the steamer Lake Nyasa and demanded extensive reparations. The ALC's boss John Moir, managed to negotiate that his company would still be allowed free passage in the area but only after he had agreed to pay an annual fee to Chikusi and an even larger sum to Chief Ramakukan.

Elizabeth continued to live with the Scotts. She was not employed by the mission, but she became an assistant paid by and for the Scotts. It was not until 1888 that the situation was resolved. David Clement Scott wrote to the mission telling them of the valued contribution that Elizabeth had made and as a result they agree to pay £60 towards the cost of her returning on furlough to Scotland.

== Second marriage ==
In 1893 she married Alexander in a multiple wedding. Her journey home was in the company of Alexander Hetherwick who was also on leave and their friendship became romantic. When they returned Alexander was based fifty miles away at Domasi and Elizabeth would visit when she could. Their wedding on 22 June 1893 is seen as evidence of the integration that was apparent in the mission as they were only one of three couples married that day. All six of them were Christians and there was a shared reception for the guests which included girls who had walked fifty miles to attend. Their first child, born in 1895 was called Clement after their friend and their second child, May, was born in 1903.

David Clement Scott was brought before an enquiry in 1897. He had been appointing Africans to be deacons and he had encouraged girls to gain an education and for women to undertake a business. The enquiry found him largely blameless but he was put under strain. Scott had been named a "negrophile", Bella had died and Scott returned to Scotland where he was relieved of his position in 1898 under the guise of his ill health. His deputy Hetherwick took over and Elizabeth went to live at the manse.

== Goodbye to Blantyre ==
In 1900 W. A. Elmslie organised a missionary conference and he invited Elizabeth Hetherwick to speak because of her long service. She was "the most experienced lady worker in the country" as she remembered Blantyre in the 1870s. The honour of being an invited speaker was unusual as it was usually her husband who was given the awards. Her husband never mentioned her in his history of the mission. In 1910 she said goodbye to Blantyre for the last time. The Hetherwick's children were to be educated in Britain and she went to look after them. Alexander continued to lead the mission in Blantyre so they did not see each other frequently except when he twice took a furlough. He retired in 1928 and they lived together in their home town until his death in 1939.

Hetherwick later moved to be near her son in Edinburgh and she died on 13 February 1945. Her obituary in Blantyre recorded only that she was the "widow of Dr Hetherwick".
