= Janet S. Beck =

Scottish missionary (1861–1917)

Janet Beck
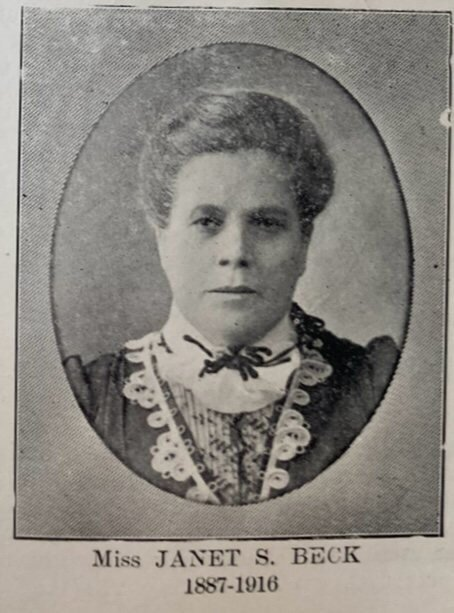
- Janet Stagg Beck
- Born: 18 March 1861; Edinburgh
- Died: 19 July 1917 (aged 56); Scotland
- Education: Moray House
- Occupation: missionary
- Employer: paid by her sisters
- Known for: honorary missionary to Blantyre

Janet Stagg Beck (18 March 1861 – 19 July 1917) was a Scottish missionary in Blantyre in what is now Malawi. She spent nearly thirty years teaching in Blantyre supported financially by her two sisters. She was appointed to the Order of Deaconesses in 1892 and she established and led the Girls’ and Women's Industrial Training Department in Blantyre whose influence was considerable.

== Life ==
She was born in Edinburgh in 1861 where she and her two sisters were members of the congregation of Greenside Church in Edinburgh. In 1861, another parishioner, David Clement Scott, was sent to Blantyre. This was an important location as it was named after David Livingstone's birthplace. David Clement Scott was followed out to what was then called Nyasaland by his brother.

Janet and her two younger sisters, Sarah Ann and Malzina Harriet, were followers of their church's inaugural minister William Glover whom died in 1871. The three decided that they wanted to help. It was agreed that one of them would be a missionary but the other two would commit to support that sister and they would make sure that the community continued to support their sister Janet took lessons in teaching at Moray House and she studied midwifery. She volunteered with the Foreign Mission Committee of the Church of Scotland.

She was accepted with the assurance that her costs would be covered by her sisters. She embarked in 1887 travelling out to central Africa escorted by David Clement Scott and his wife. The group consisted of the Scott's, his brother William Affleck Scott, the newly married Mr and Mrs McIlwain and John Bowie and his wife. It was a long journey, which started with a long voyage to Quelimane, in what is now Mozambique followed by an 80-mile journey up the River Quaqua. They were then to take a steamer up the Zambezi to the River Shire, but they had to take a break at Vicenti when the steamer broke down. Mrs McIlwain became ill and died in Janet's arms. Janet then had the same fever, but she recovered. They went on to Katungas, where the last 28 miles were a trek.

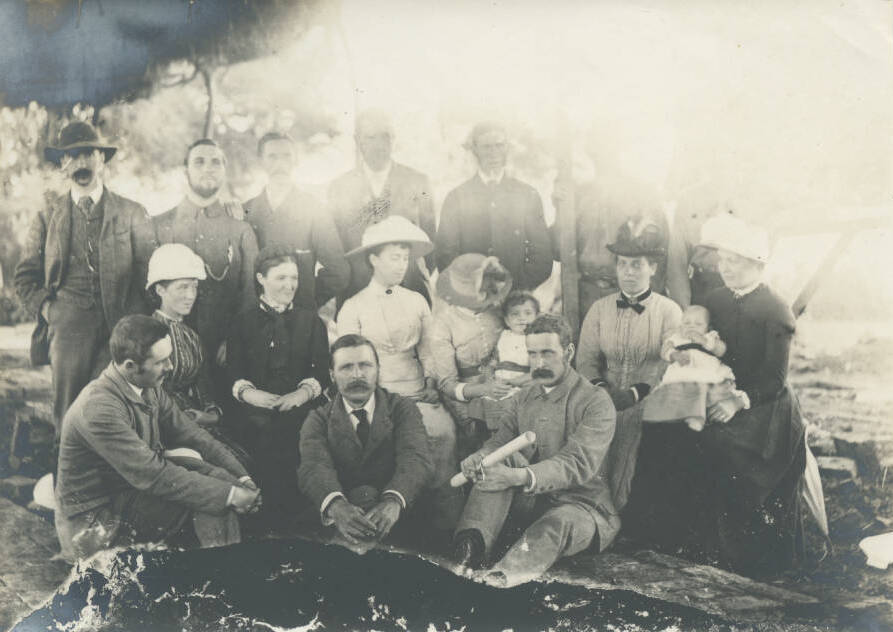
Laying the foundations of Blantyre church in November 1888. Dr John Bowie (standing far left) and David Clement Scott (right in the front row). Six women in a row. Walker is on the left, Harriet Henderson is thought to be the one studying her baby, and Janet Beck is the last but one.

Of the first twelve missionaries sent to Blantyre, five were women. In the following year they began bible lessons for women in Blantyre and in 1881 she assisted Rev MacDonald, Bella Scott and Mrs Hetherwick in creating a "school system". Girls were trained to be mothers. In 1887 she was in Blantyre as the head of the Girls’ and Women's Industrial Training Department in Blantyre. By 1888 the students also included women and 60 were being taught. This success encouraged the mission managers to send more women missionaries. The students were taught to cut, sew, read and write and it was said that the homes of these students became identifiable by their influence. The students studied the bible and they would go out and pass on their learning.

She and John McIlwain were loyal supporters of what was described as a double act of David Clement Scott and his deputy Alexander Hetherwick, although others were not so loyal. In 1892 she returned to Scotland on furlough and there she became a deaconess. The first deaconess had been appointed four years before and she was appointed at the Tolbooth Church before that year's General Assembly of the Church of Scotland.

The critics of Clement Scott in Malawi (e.g. Robert Spence Hynde) were gathering support in Scotland. He was accused of "ritualism" and being a "negrophile". In 1898 he was removed and Hetherwick was his natural successor. Beck led the training department in Blantyre until 1916 and during that time the influence of the women she had educated was seen outside Blantyre where the students went to work.

In 1892, the foreign missionaries in Blantyre were Rev. David Clement and Bella Scott, John McIlwain who had arrived with her in 1884. Mrs. Fenwick and John A. Smith had arrived a year after her and Mrs. Smith and Rev. William Affleck Scott had arrived in 1892. Other missionaries were George Adamson, James Reid and H. D. Herd.

== Return to Scotland, death and legacy ==
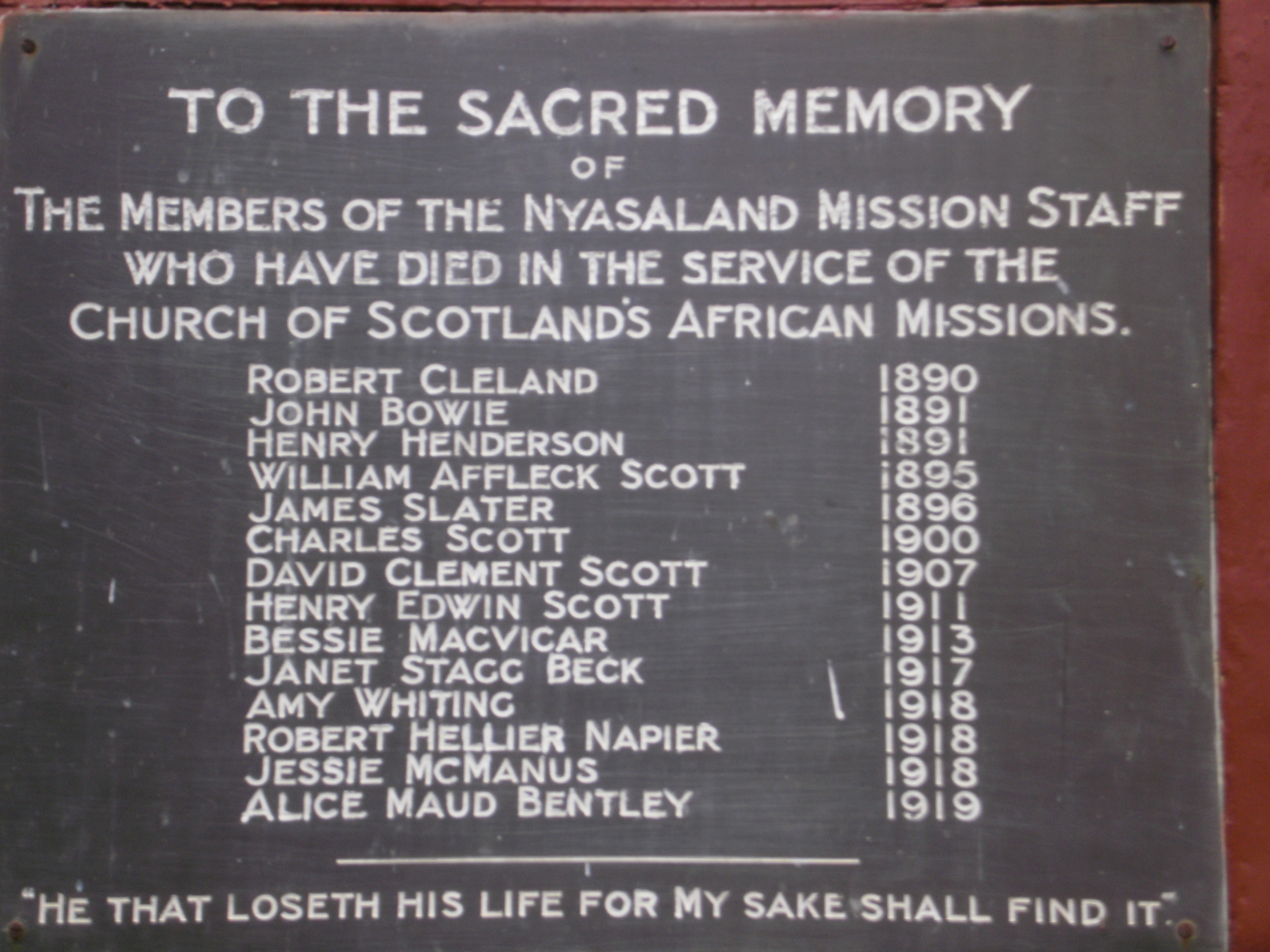
Plaque in St Michael and All Angels Church in Blantyre.

She was known as "Miss Beck" and she was an "Honorary Lady Missionary". Beck's time at the mission was brought to an end when she had an accident while riding in a motorbike's sidecar on Mandala Hill. She was badly injured and she never fully recovered from the accident. She went back to Scotland 18 months later.

The mission's leader, Alexander Hetherwick said that her contribution was the "finest bit of work it has been given to any woman missionary to do in this part of the mission field." She died in 1917 and she was buried in Corstorphine in Edinburgh where her gravestone records her 29 years in Nyasaland and the later deaths of her two unmarried sisters who had funded those 29 years.
