= Alexander Hetherwick =

Scottish minister

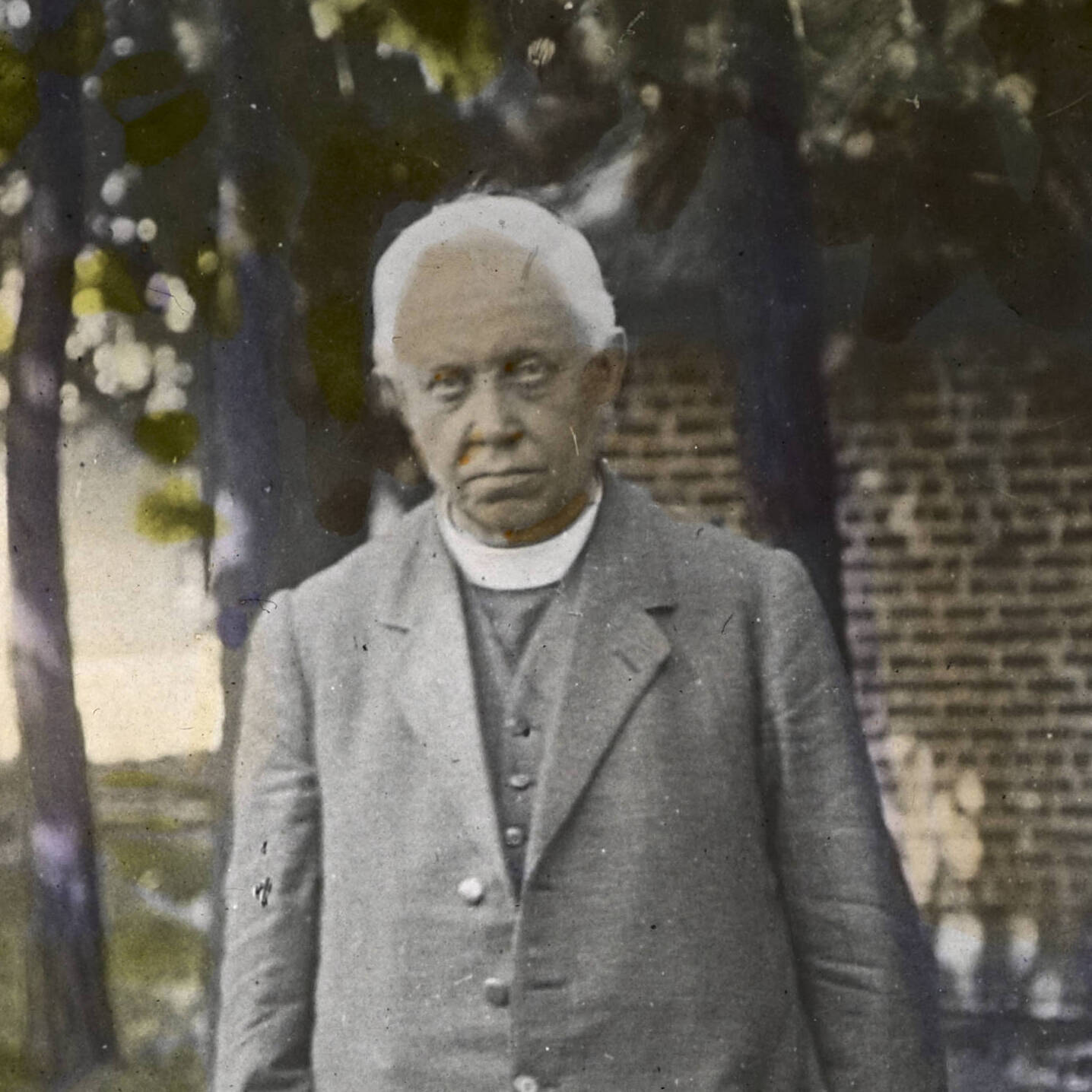
- Born: 12 April 1860; Savoch, Aberdeenshire
- Died: 3 April 1939 (aged 78); Aberdeen, Scotland
- Education: Aberdeen University
- Occupation: Missionary
- Predecessor: Rev David Clement Scott
- Spouse: Elizabeth Hetherwick
- Children: 2

Alexander Hetherwick CBE (12 April 1860 – 3 April 1939) was a Scottish minister remembered as a missionary in Africa. Based in Blantyre, Nyasaland (in present day Malawi) he wrote extensively on local languages and also was a competent map-maker. W. P. Livingstone described him as a "Prince of Missionaries".

== Life ==
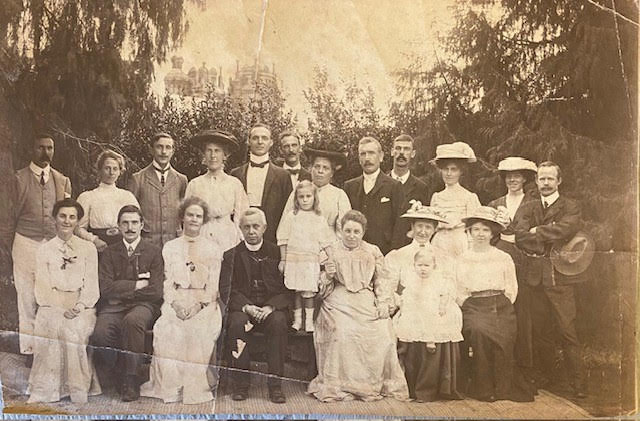
Blantyre missionaries: L to R Back Row:Frank Bowman, Mrs. McFarland, Mr. and Mrs. Currie, Mr. Armitage, Mr. Wyllie, Miss Beck, Stuart Bowman, Mrs. ???, Miss Priest, Mr. Baird. L to R Front Row:Miss ?ow?, Mr. R M McFarland, Miss McNab, Alexander Hetherwick. May Hetherwick (child standing), Elizabeth Hetherwick, Mrs. Burnett (and Ian in front), Miss Anna Fange?

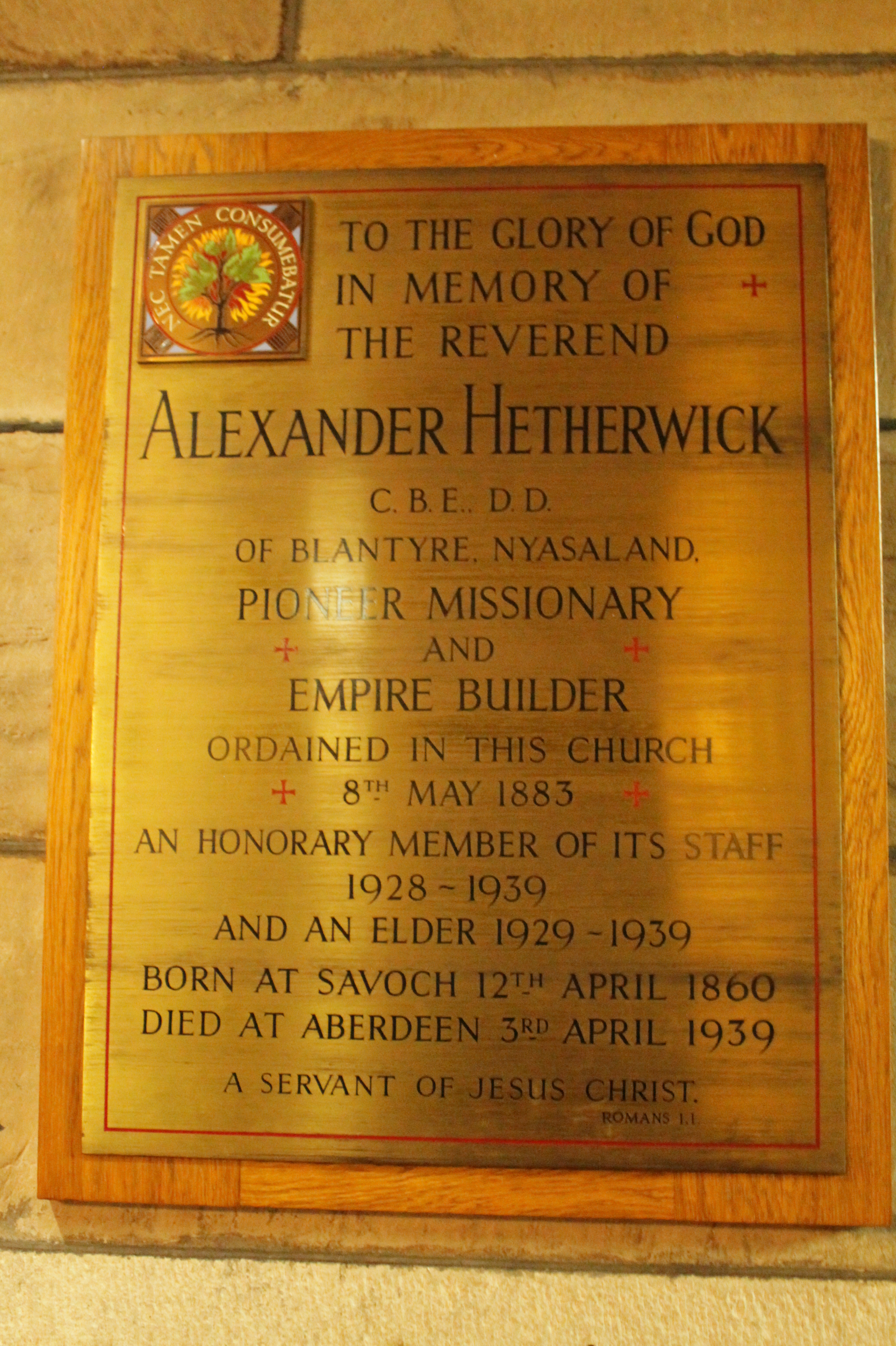
Plaque to Rev Alexander Hetherwick, Kirk of St Nicholas, Aberdeen

He was born in Savoch in Aberdeenshire on 12 April 1860. He originally studied Mathematics at Aberdeen University but after graduation (around 1880) decided to train for the ministry, despite having the highest marks in Mathematics. He was ordained by the Church of Scotland in the Kirk of St Nicholas in Aberdeen in 1883. He requested transfer to do missionary work in Africa in 1885 and moved to the mission in Blantyre in what is now known as Malawi. He was charged with working with the then hostile tribes of the Zomba plateau. He was a speaker at the International Mission Conference in London in 1888. In 1898, he succeeded Rev David Clement Scott as head of the Blantyre mission.

In 1893, he married Elizabeth Chisholm who he had met as a member of the Scotts' household. Elizabeth was the widow of George Fenwick had been killed after he had murdered the Makololo chief Chipatula. David and Bella Scott had taken Elizabeth into their home. Elizabeth had previously been a missionary and she had again become a valued teacher at the mission. In 1913, he oversaw the marriage of Grace Bismarck to Lewis Bandawe which attracted a multi-racial wedding party and a noted photo (said to be) by the Nyasaland photographer, Mungo Murray Chisuse.

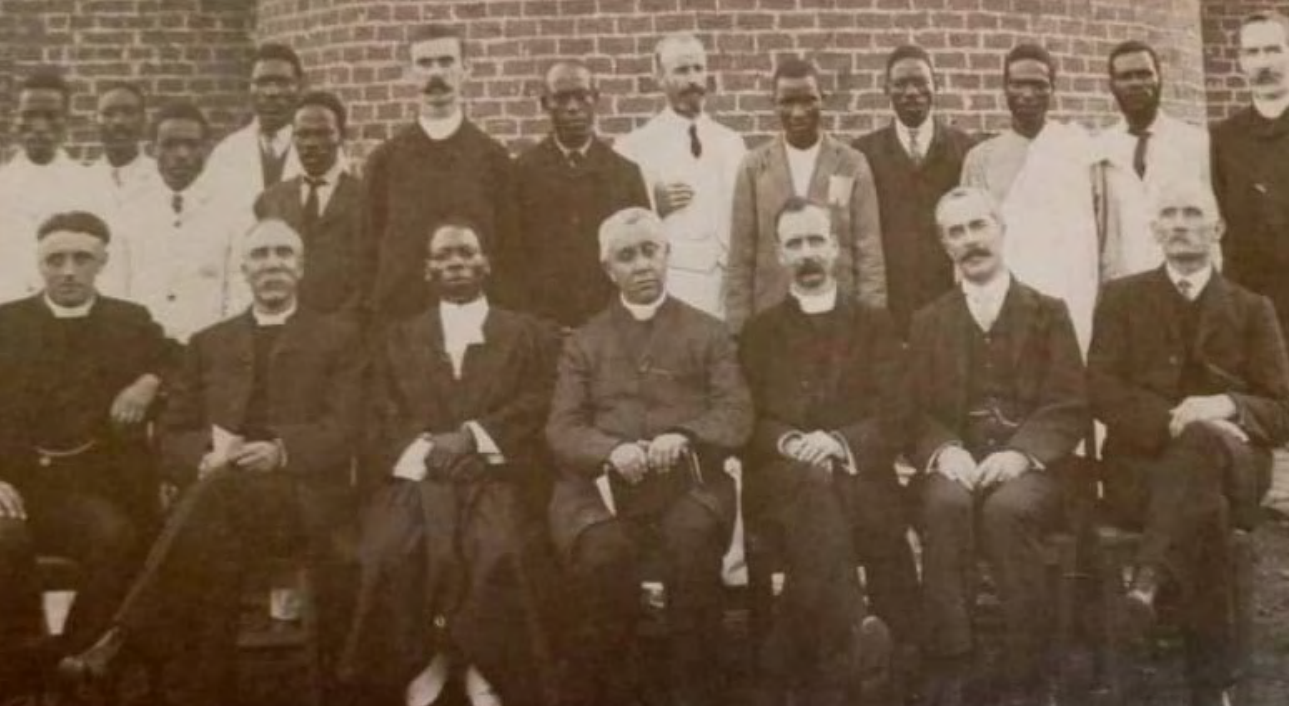
Ordination of Malawi’s first African Presbyterian Minister, Rev Harry Kambwiri Matecheta, 9 March 1911, Hetherwick at centre with Matecheta to his right.

In 1915, he was involved in the enquiry into the John Chilembwe Rebellion. In conjunction with Robert Laws he founded the Church of Central Africa Presbytery in 1924. He was appointed a Commander of the Order of the British Empire (CBE) in the 1925 Birthday Honours.

He retired in 1928 and returned to Aberdeen. Hetherwick showed his pugnacious character when he criticised W. P. Livingstone for his inaccuracy in his 1921 biography of Robert Laws. Hetherwick thought that Livingstone was incorrect in his recounting how Henry Henderson had chosen the site at Blantyre for the mission. He called Livingstone's account a travesty. W. P. Livingstone wrote Hetherwick's biography in 1931 in which he called him a "Prince of Missionaries".

Hetherwick died in Aberdeen on 3 April 1939.

== Memorials ==
A brass plaque to Hetherwick was placed in the Kirk of St Nicholas in the 1940s.

== Publications ==
- Introductory Handbook of the Yao Language (1889)
- Dictionary of the Chichewa Language
- Robert Hellier Napier (1926)
- The Romance of Blantyre (1931)
- A Practical Manual of the Nyanja Language (1920 reprinted 1932)
- The Gospel and the African (1932)

== Maps created ==
- Lake Shirwa and Neighbourhood (1888)
