= Henry Henderson Institute =

Coordinates: 15.784°S 35.022°E

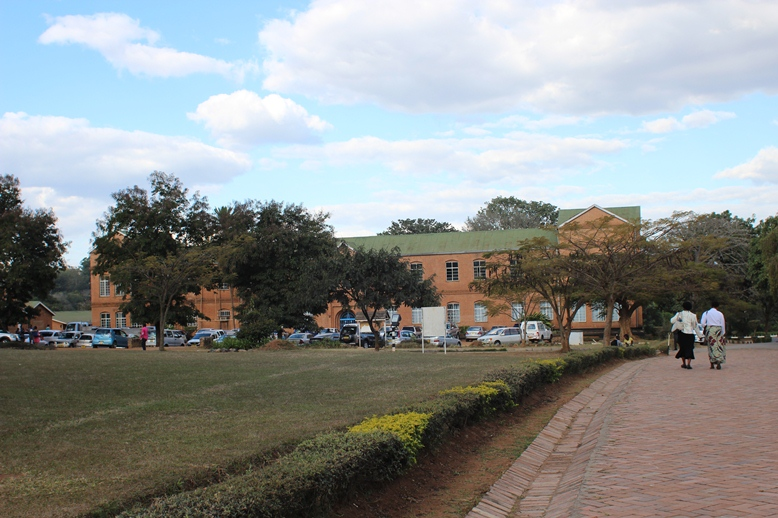
The Henry Henderson Institute in 2014

Henry Henderson Institute (HHI) is an educational establishment in Blantyre, Malawi, founded in 1909. It was named in honour of Henry Henderson (1843–91), lay missionary of the Church of Scotland, who founded the Blantyre Mission.

== History ==
The foundation included a primary school, a teacher training college, a theological college, and a technical college to teach practical skills such as carpentry, bricklaying and printing. It also served as printer for the Blantyre Mission; producing religious texts, school textbooks, and government and other daily and weekly publications.

Later, training in mechanical skills was added to the curriculum. In 1957, the Henry Henderson Institute Secondary School was opened. Willie Chokani became the first African headmaster in Nyasaland, and he held this post until he was imprisoned in 1959.

HHI is said to have "played a most significant role in religious, educational, and political developments in Malawi".

The Institute was in the grounds of St Michael and All Angels Church, Blantyre. In 2021 it was announced that the school would close indefinitely as a result of indiscipline, but it did not. The secondary school was relocated to Lunzu area where the old Kaphuka Private Secondary School was located, up to now that is where the Henry Henderson Institute is operating. The old HHI is currently operating as Blantyre Synod University and another High Institution Learning (HHS) was constructed and it is in operational. The HHS offers O level and A levels.

== Alumni ==
Jonathon Sandaya was educated here from 1913 when George Hall was the head teacher. Rev. Sandaya became the General Secretary of the Blantyre church synod.
