= David Clement Scott =

Church of Scotland missionary (1853–1907)

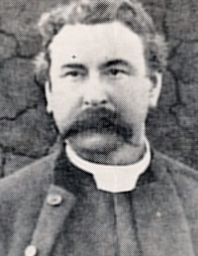
- Born: David Clement Ruffelle Scott; 23 April 1853; Edinburgh
- Died: 18 October 1907 (aged 54); Kikuyu
- Occupation: missionary
- Known for: ambitious missionary who built a church in Blantyre
- Spouse: Bella Bowie

David Clement Ruffelle Scott (23 April 1853 – 18 October 1907) was a Scottish born polymath who became a Church of Scotland missionary in Africa. He was the supervisor in Blantyre until he was relieved in 1898. He then went to Kenya in 1901 where his ambitious plans caused his financial ruin. He died there in 1907. Recent study regards Scott's regard for racial equality as important and documents how others plotted against him.

== Life ==
Scott was born in 1853 in Edinburgh. He was an exceptional student and a polymath who excelled at philosophy. He attended Greenside Church in Edinburgh. He led the mission at Blantyre in Nyasaland which is now Malawi from 1881 as the church was supportive of missionary work. His brother, William Affleck Scott, soon followed.

From 1881 to 1898, the mission in Blantyre was run by Scott. In 1883 a former missionary George Fenwick had been killed after he had murdered the Makololo chief Chipatula. Fenwick's wife Elizabeth had also arrived as a missionary and after the George's death, David and Bella took Elizabeth into their home. Elizabeth was to become a valued teacher and in time she married Scott's deputy and successor Alexander Hetherwick.

The three Beck sisters were parishioners at Scott's former Greenside Church in Edinburgh and they decided to send one of them to Blantyre. Scott escorted Janet S. Beck to join the mission in 1888. She served in Blantyre for nearly thirty years supported by her sisters.

Scott was not trained as a builder or an architect but he built the impressive St Michael and All Angels Church, between 1888 and 1891. The church was built by missionaries and a team of local workmen who had no knowledge of European architecture or building techniques. He also created his Encyclopaedic Dictionary of the Mang'anja Language, the foremost dictionary for Mang'anja and the closely related Chichewa language. Scott reverred the language comparing it to Greek. His dictionary was subsequently edited by Scott's successor in Blantyre, Alexander Hetherwick.

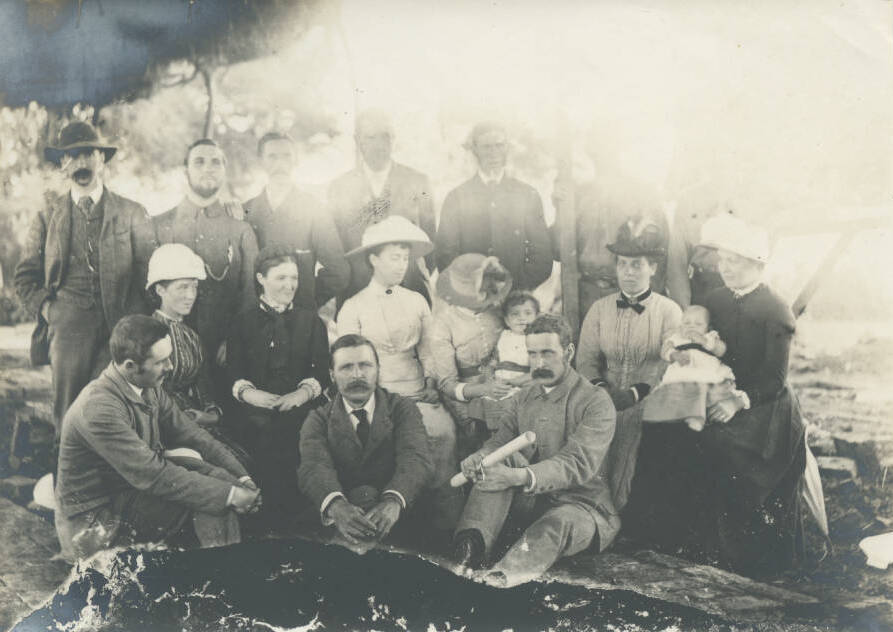
Laying the foundations of Blantyre church in November 1888. Dr. John Bowie is the one standing on the left with a hat. Grace Walker, front left on ground, Harriet Henderson is thought to be the one studying her baby. At the front:Rev. Robt. Cleland, at the centre is John Buchanan, next to him Rev. David Clement Scott then (behind) Janet S. Beck.

Robert Spence Hynde was a Scottish lay missionary who had served out his time and he then became a settler. Hynde disagreed with Scott who was an advocate of the ordination of Africans. From the early 1890s onwards, Hynde gathered support from other Scottish planters, and plotted against Scott with the help of James Rankin who was the minister of Muthill.

British moves to establish more control, and their high-handed approach to the land, provoked African resistance. Hynde and his business partner Robert Ross Stark were involved in a violent episode in 1895, reported on by Scott at Damosi. Scott wrote home to Scotland about an attack in early 1895 on the mission station. It was carried out by followers of Kawinga, a Yao chief, who started by molesting Malemia's people, taking some prisoner. Attacks by Kawinga aimed at the mission were driven off by Malemia, and then by British-led Sikhs and Atonga under Alfred Sharpe. On 27 January a boma was partially completed by Malemia's men with an NCO of the Royal Engineers named Fletcher, as a defensive work. A serious attack by Kawinga's forces came on 7 February, backed by other local chiefs, targeting the mission, the boma and Hynde and Stark's residence.

In 1895 Hynde and Starke founded the Central African Planter which voiced complaints from the white planters against Scott. In his introduction to a 1985 reprint of the Planter, McCracken credits Hynde's editorial line with prompting the Commission of Inquiry into Scott's mission work. Hynde wrote to The Scotsman on the matter under the name "The Planter", and with Dr James Rankin attended the 1897 meeting in Edinburgh of the Foreign Mission Committee of the Church of Scotland that nominated the Commission. Scott had been named a "negrophile" and he returned to Scotland after he lost his first wife. He was relieved of his position in 1898 under the guise of his ill health.

In 1901 Scott was sent to Kikuyu in Kenya. Here he cleared the land and to the annoyance of the Foreign Mission Committee he bought an estate of 3,000 acres which was managed by a Christian labour force. He lost his own and other peoples money and the Foreign Mission Committee again insisted on his obedience. He died in Kikuyu in 1907.

== Legacy ==
The church Scott designed and built is a national monument. His Encyclopaedic Dictionary of the Mang'anja Language was revised and reissued and in 2022 an academic book by Harri Englund was published based on his life and work. It was titled Visions for Racial Equality: David Clement Scott and the Struggle for Justice in Nineteenth-Century Malawi. Englund argues that Scott was a visionary in wanting to recognise the equality of Africans and to resist the colonial ambitions of people like Cecil Rhodes. In a time when colonialists are not well regarded, England argues that Scott should be revered.
