= Henry Henderson (missionary) =

British missionary in Malawi

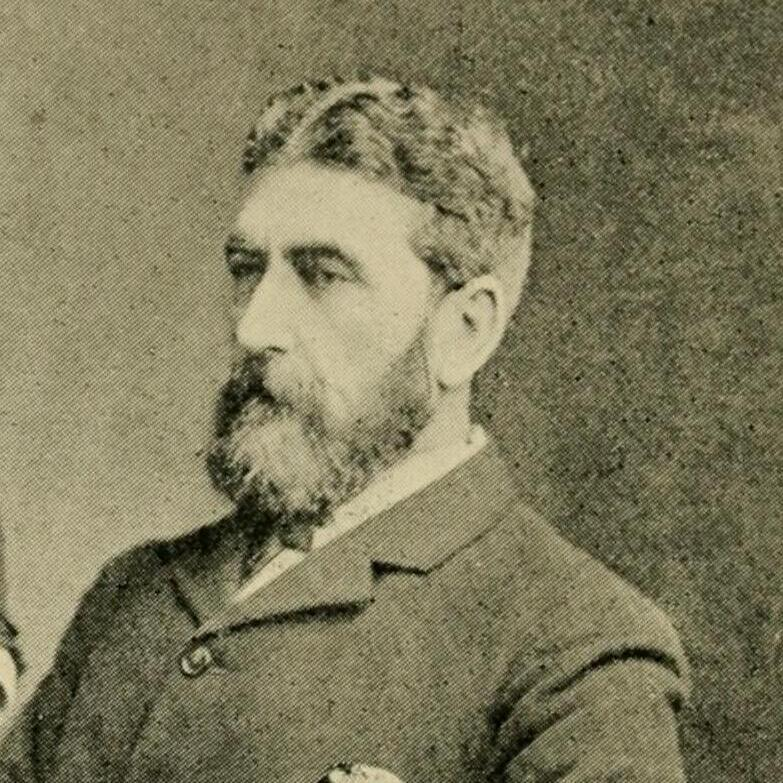
- A "martyrs of Blantyre" Henry Henderson

Personal life
- Born: 1843 Perthshire, Scotland
- Died: 12 February 1891 (aged 47–48) Quilimane, Mozambique
- Spouse: Harriet (born Bowie)

Religious life
- Religion: Christianity
- Denomination: Church of Scotland

Henry Henderson (1843, Perthshire, Scotland – 12 February 1891, Quelimane, Mozambique) was a lay Church of Scotland missionary in present-day Malawi. He founded the Blantyre Mission in Malawi, which in time became the city of Blantyre. He was identified as one of the three "Martyrs of Blantyre" even though his wife, Harriet Henderson and their son also died.

== Life ==
Henderson was the son of a Church of Scotland minister. He studied briefly at the University of Edinburgh, and then worked briefly in Queensland, Australia. In 1875, he volunteered to represent the Church of Scotland in an endeavour by the Free Church of Scotland to establish a mission in the Lake Nyasa region in memory of medical missionary and explorer David Livingstone (1813–73). He travelled to Malawi with several others including Rev Dr Robert Laws. In 1876, Chief Kapeni gave Henderson land at modern Blantyre (named after Livingstone's birthplace) to create a Church of Scotland mission. There were difficulties in the early years: some of the missionaries had unrealistic expectations, and were indisciplined. In 1881, Rev. Duff MacDonald (who had headed the mission since 1878) and some other missionaries were dismissed. After the appointment of Rev. David C. Scott to head the mission, Henderson expanded its activities to Zomba, Domasi and Mulanje.

In February 1888 he was in London where he married Harriet Bowie in a Presbyterian church. They had a son in Malawi whom Henry called "The little cardinal".

== Deaths and legacy ==
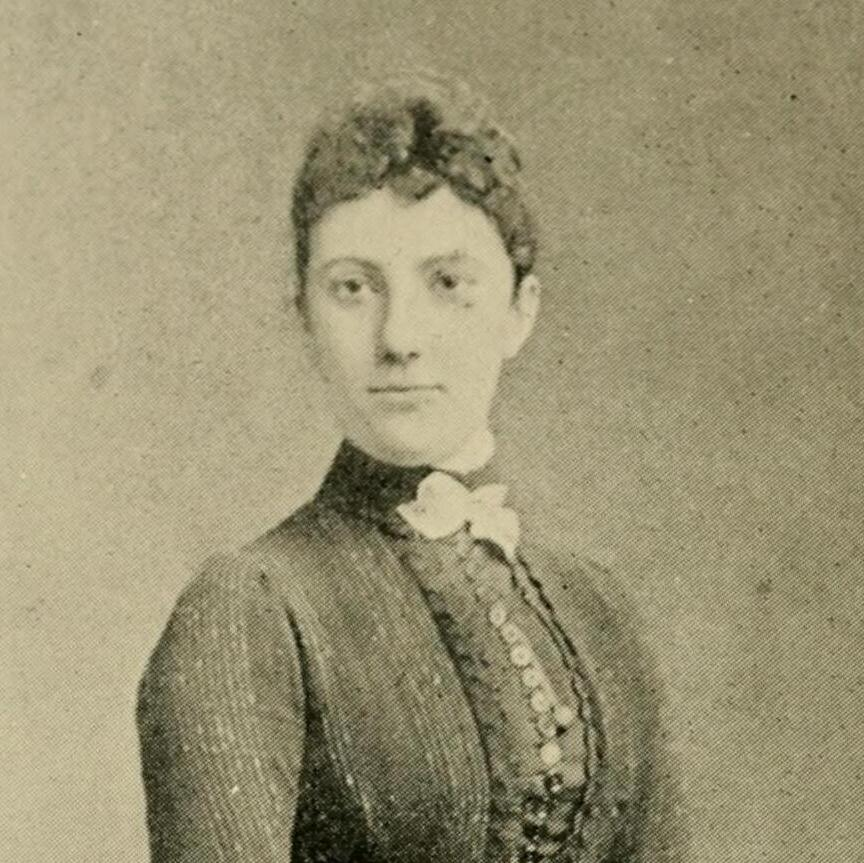
Henderson's wife, Harriet, a forgotten "martyr of Blantyre."

"The little cardinal" was to die from diphtheria despite an operation to restore his airway by Harriet's brother, Dr John Bowie. Within days Harriet and John also died from diphtheria. Henry became ill and he died in 1891, on a return journey to Britain.

A river steamer, Henry Henderson, acquired by the Blantyre Mission in 1892, was named in his honour. She was crewed by African graduates of the Mission, and operated as a floating church and school on Shire River, the biggest river in Malawi. The Henry Henderson Institute, an educational institute in Blantyre, was named in his honour; it opened in 1909 within the grounds of St Michael and All Angels Church, Blantyre. The institute had an infant and secondary school, a theology and a teacher training college. Trades taught included printing, which enabled the institute to publish a wide variety of texts. In 2021 it was announced that the school would close indefinitely as a result of indiscipline.

In 1892, William Robertson published The Martyrs of Blantyre which he identified as Henry Henderson, Dr. John Bowie and Robert Cleland. A plaque also appears on the church recording the people from the mission who lost their lives. The first three are Robert Cleland, John Bowie and Henry Henderson.
