= Diocese of Upper Shire =

Anglican diocese in the Shire Valley of Malawi

Location
- Country: Malawi
- Ecclesiastical province: Central Africa

Statistics
- Parishes: 41
- Schools: 69

Information
- Rite: Anglican
- Established: 2002
- Cathedral: Sts. Peter and Paul Cathedral Church, Mangochi
- Secular priests: 58

Current leadership
- Bishop: William Mchombo

Map
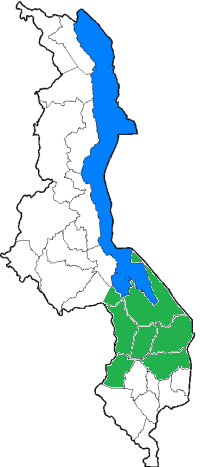
- Location of the diocese within Malawi

The Diocese of Upper Shire is a diocese of the Church of the Province of Central Africa. One of the church's four dioceses in Malawi, it was formed in 2002 out of the Diocese of Southern Malawi. As of 2025, the diocese had 58 priests serving in 41 parishes.

== History ==
The diocese was split from the Diocese of Southern Malawi and its first bishop was Bernard Malango, a Zambian bishop who also served as archbishop of Central Africa during his tenure. The diocese inherited much of the physical infrastructure of the Diocese of Southern Malawi, including the diocesan headquarters and bishop's residence in Malosa. The second bishop, Brighton Vita Malasa, was elected by the episcopal synod of the province in 2008 after six votes at the diocesan level failed to achieve the required two-thirds majority.

Malasa's 14-year tenure included significant controversy. In 2019, with some members of the diocese seeking Malasa's ouster over charges of abuse of power and financial impropriety, Malasa called police on his critics within the diocese. Later that year, 39 of 41 parishes in the diocese signed a petition alleging corruption, harassment and "maladministration" and demanding the bishop's resignation. In response, Malasa excommunicated 28 priests and additional laity who had opposed his decisions. He later reversed this action after consulting with Archbishop Albert Chama. Protests against Malasa continued throughout 2020 and 2021. Malasa refused to resign without receiving a K1 billion (US$1053697.48) severance package.

In October 2022, Chama excommunicated Malasa under the canons of the church for refusing to meet with him over the charges, which in addition to financial impropriety also included adultery. Following Malasa's excommunication and after the diocese was unable to reach agreement on a new bishop, Bishop of Eastern Zambia William Mchombo was selected by the province's episcopal synod as the third bishop of Upper Shire. He was enthroned at Sts. Peter and Paul Cathedral on May 18, 2024.

After the Province of Central Africa allowed individual dioceses to ordain women as priests in 2024, the Diocese of Upper Shire reaffirmed its policy of ordaining only men to priesthood.

== Activities ==
Under Bishop Malasa, the diocese participated in the Gates Foundation-funded Health Population Project and observed August 25, 2013 as "a special day for teaching people on the effects of overpopulation." The diocese also operates several health facilities, including a health sciences college, two hospitals and eight community health centres.

The diocese has promoted tree planting as part of its environmental stewardship activities. In 2016, Beautify Malawi Trust patron Gertrude Mutharika announced a K3.5 million (US$4874.62) donation to the diocese for its tree-planting activities. These activities continued under Mchombo with a focus on mitigating contributing factors to and effects of climate change.

Starting in 2017, the diocese has operated an ecumenical scholarship programme with the Roman Catholic Diocese of Mangochi. Funded by overseas donors, the programme provides €600 scholarships for tuition, room, board, uniform and other expenses for poor children to attend boarding schools.

In 2025, the diocese launched a savings ministry in 19 parishes funded by British charity Five Talents. The initiative is intended to provide financial literacy training and encourage participants to form savings groups.

== Bishops ==
No.	Name	Dates	Notes
1	Bernard Malango	2002–2007	Translated from Northern Zambia; also Archbishop of Central Africa
2	Brighton Vita Malasa	2009–2022	Excommunicated by provincial episcopal synod
3	William Mchombo	2024–present	Translated from Eastern Zambia

== Companion diocese and partnerships ==
The Diocese of Birmingham in the Church of England
St. John's Vancouver in the Anglican Church in North America's Diocese of Canada (since 2003)
