= Jackson Biggers =

American Anglican bishop in Africa

The Right Reverend Jackson Biggers D.D.
- Bishop of Northern Malawi
- Church: Church of the Province of Central Africa; Episcopal Church
- Diocese: Northern Malawi
- In office: 1995 – 2000
- Successor: Christopher Boyle

Orders
- Ordination: 1963 (diaconate); 1964 (priesthood) by John Allin
- Consecration: 4 April 1995 by Walter Khotso Makhulu

Personal details
- Born: 16 May 1937 (age 89) Corinth, Mississippi, USA
- Denomination: Anglican
- Education: University of Mississippi (B.A.); Sewanee: The University of the South (B.D.)

Jackson Cunningham Biggers (born 16 May 1937) is an American Anglican missionary bishop. Ordained as an Episcopal priest, he spent much his career in Malawi and served as the first Bishop of Northern Malawi in the Church of the Province of Central Africa in the 1990s.

== Early life, education and ordination ==
Biggers was born in 1937 in Corinth, Mississippi to a farmer and hardware store owner. After graduating from public schools in Corinth, he attended Georgetown University before receiving a B.A. from the University of Mississippi in 1960. Biggers went on to the School of Theology at the University of the South, graduating in 1963. Biggers was ordained to the diaconate in the Episcopal Diocese of Mississippi in 1963 while serving at St. James' Episcopal Church in Jackson, then to the priesthood by Bishop John Allin in 1964.

== Missionary to Malawi ==
Sermons preached at Sewanee by Bishops Stephen Neill and Donald Arden fueled Biggers' interest in overseas missions and Malawi in particular. He relocated to the Diocese of Malawi in 1964, initially serving for two years as rector of St. Peter's, Lilongwe, as well as chaplain to suffragan bishop Josiah Mtekateka. Biggers returned to the United States after being called as rector of Church of the Redeemer in Biloxi in 1970, then returned to Malawi as the first archdeacon of Lilongwe in 1972. He was the only non-Malawian priest in the diocese at that time.

In July 1974, Biggers' work permit was abruptly revoked and he was exiled by the autocratic Hastings Banda government. He returned to the United States, where he assisted then-Presiding Bishop John M. Allin in New York. He briefly served in the Diocese of the Bahamas and the Turks and Caicos Islands before accepting a call to return as rector of Church of the Redeemer in Biloxi, where he remained until 1994.

== Return to Malawi as bishop ==
In 1994, the decision was taken to divide the Diocese of Lake Malawi, with the northern portion becoming the Diocese of Northern Malawi. Following the transition to multiparty democracy and end of Banda's government, Biggers was asked by several people in the Malawian church to stand for election as the new diocese's first bishop. "I asked them to try to find a Malawian," he later said, "but I also said if they thought I had anything that would be helpful to them at this time, I would agree to let them put my name in."

Biggers was consecrated by Archbishop Walter Khotso Makhulu on 4 April 1995 in Mzuzu, where he preached to a crowd of 3,000 in Chewa. He spent much of his time at St Peter's Cathedral, Likoma, commuting via boat to the mainland for episcopal duties. During his episcopacy, he raised funds for facilities in Likoma and Mzuzu. He invited the Anglican sisters of the Community of St. Mary to establish a house in Malawi. He also developed health services, primary and secondary schools, relief programs and clergy training in the diocese. Biggers left Malawi in 2000, stepping down as bishop, to receive successful cancer treatment.

== Later life ==
After his cancer treatment, Biggers returned to Malawi, where he lives most of the year, dividing his time between Zomba and a retirement community in Florida.

The 50th anniversary of Biggers' ordination was celebrated in 2013 during a service at Likoma Cathedral, where the diocese's newly formed Bishop Biggers Secondary School was named in his honor.

Anglican Communion titles
New title	Bishop of Northern Malawi; 1995–2000	Succeeded by Christopher Boyle
