= William Mchombo =

Malawian Anglican bishop (born 1962)

The Right Reverend William Mchombo
- Bishop of Upper Shire
- Church: Church of the Province of Central Africa
- Diocese: Upper Shire
- In office: 2024–present
- Predecessor: Brighton Vita Malasa
- Previous post: Bishop of Eastern Zambia (2003–2024)

Orders
- Ordination: 14 June 1992 (diaconate); 4 July 1993 (priesthood) by Bernard Malango
- Consecration: 8 June 2003 by Bernard Malango

Personal details
- Born: August 21, 1962 (age 63) Mufulira District, Zambia
- Denomination: Anglicanism
- Education: University of the Western Cape (BTh)

William Joseph Mchombo (born 21 August 1962) is a Zambian-born Malawian Anglican bishop. He was bishop of Eastern Zambia in the Church of the Province of Central Africa from 2003 until 2024, when he was enthroned as bishop of Upper Shire in Malawi.

== Early life, education and ordained ministry ==
Mchombo was born to Malawian parents in Mufulira District, Zambia, in 1962, and raised in Zambia. He received a bachelor's degree in theology from the University of the Western Cape and was ordained to the diaconate in 1992 and the priesthood in 1993.

== Episcopacy ==
Mchombo was elected the second bishop of Eastern Zambia in 2003 and consecrated to the episcopacy by Archbishop Bernard Malango at St. Luke's Cathedral in Msoro on 8 June 2003. As bishop, he became known as "the green bishop of Zambia" for his advocacy for tree planting and environmental clubs in schools.

After 21 years in the Diocese of Eastern Zambia—and following the excommunication of Brighton Vita Malasa as bishop of Upper Shire and the failure of the Malawian diocese to agree on a new bishop—Mchombo was selected by the province's episcopal synod as the third bishop of Upper Shire. He was enthroned at Sts. Peter and Paul Cathedral in Mangochi on 18 May 2024. Malawian President Lazarus Chakwera, Vice President Saulos Chilima and National Assembly Speaker Catherine Gotani Hara were among the dignitaries present.

As bishop of Upper Shire, Mchombo continued to promote tree planting and environmental initiatives. In 2025, Mchombo launched a savings ministry in 19 parishes, funded by British charity Five Talents, intended to provide financial literacy training and encourage participants to form savings groups.

After the Province of Central Africa allowed individual dioceses to ordain women as priests in 2024, the Diocese of Upper Shire reaffirmed its policy of ordaining only men to priesthood. However, Mchombo also said the diocese will expand its training for women to hold lay leadership roles in the church.

Anglican Communion titles
Preceded by John Osmers	Bishop of Eastern Zambia; 2003–2024	Succeeded by Dennis Milanzi
Preceded by Brighton Vita Malasa	Bishop of Upper Shire; Since 2024	Incumbent
