= John Osmers =

New Zealand-born anti-apartheid activist and bishop (1935–2021)

The Right Reverend John Osmers CNZM
- Bishop of Eastern Zambia
- Church: Anglican Church of Southern Africa; Central Africa
- Diocese: Eastern Zambia
- Successor: William Mchombo

Personal details
- Born: John Robert Osmers; 23 February 1935 Ashburton, New Zealand
- Died: 16 June 2021 (aged 86) Lusaka, Zambia

John Robert Osmers CNZM (23 February 1935 – 16 June 2021) was a New Zealand anti-apartheid activist. He was Anglican Bishop of Eastern Zambia from 1995 to 2002.

== Early life and education ==
Osmers was born in Ashburton on 23 February 1935, the son of the Reverend Eric A. Osmers, and was raised in Anglican vicarages in New Zealand. After completing his schooling at Christchurch Boys' High School, Osmers obtained a BA, and an MA(Hons) in English language and literature, at Canterbury University College, Christchurch.

Osmers read about apartheid in South Africa in Trevor Huddleston's book Nought for our Comfort. In 1958, he travelled to South Africa by ship and toured the country by motorbike for six weeks. This visit determined his wish to work eventually in Southern Africa. For one year, he studied anthropology at the London School of Economics (LSE), as well the Sesotho language at School of Oriental and African Studies (SOAS), London.

== Career ==
With the encouragement of Father Huddleston, Osmers decided to study to become an Anglican priest, and studied for two years at Mirfield Theological College, Yorkshire, England, run by monks of the Community of the Resurrection, a community with a long history of involvement in southern Africa. He was ordained in 1961, and worked as a priest for three years in the Yorkshire working-class parish of Rawmarsh near Rotherham. Huddleston encouraged Osmers to join the Diocese of Lesotho in the Anglican Church of Southern Africa. He worked in Lesotho as a parish priest for 15 years in the mountain parishes of Quthing and Masite. He was also Travelling Secretary of the Lesotho Student Christian Movement, as well as a member of the anti-apartheid South African University Christian Movement, which was forced to close down in 1972. Osmers was made a prohibited immigrant to South Africa from 1970 to 1991. In 1976, he became closely involved with South African students who came to Lesotho following state violence against the student demonstrations in Soweto. He helped them to enter schools in Lesotho, and encouraged them to become cadres of the African National Congress (ANC).

In 1979, Osmers was attacked by a bomb planted by South African Security in a parcel of the ANC magazine Sechaba; he lost his right hand and the front of his legs in the blast. There were six people in the room where the bomb exploded. Another victim was Phyllis Naidoo, a renowned anti-apartheid activist in exile in Lesotho; the parcel bomb was opened in her house. As a result of this attack, the ANC president Oliver Tambo and the ANC leadership in exile saw that members of the faith communities were actively involved in the liberation struggle and opened 'the church front', which later became the multifaith ANC chaplaincy. This involved supporters working underground in South Africa, and church leaders and institutions outside the country.

Through pressure from the South African government on the government of Lesotho, Osmers was forced to leave Lesotho in 1980. He worked for some months in the ANC office in London, then spent several months in New Zealand doing a national tour for Halt All Racist Tours (HART), speaking against the Springbok rugby tour of New Zealand in 1981.

In the same year, Osmers became a parish priest in Botswana, where he worked for eight years in Gaborone and the parish of Molepolole. In 1985, the South African forces attacked and killed ANC members in their homes in Botswana. At the time, Osmers was in New Zealand, and when he returned to Botswana, he was the only ANC member in the country who was not underground. In 1988, Botswana security warned Osmers that he was being targeted by a South African death squad, and he was obliged to leave the country immediately for his own safety.

Osmers moved to Lusaka, Zambia, where for five years he was chaplain to the ANC, as well as helping in the Anglican Diocese of Lusaka. In those years, the ANC had a large community in Lusaka of 3000 cadres, the government-in-waiting for the new South Africa. Osmers officiated at ANC funerals, weddings, and national services, as well as providing pastoral care for those who were sick and in prison. When cadres returned to South Africa from 1991 onwards, Osmers decided to remain in Zambia helping with Anglican diocesan administration. In 1995, he was elected as the first Bishop of the new diocese of Eastern Zambia, and retired in 2002. Subsequently, he was Rector of St. John's Anglican Seminary in Kitwe until 2011. He was Assistant Bishop of Lusaka, helped as an assistant priest at the Holy Cross Cathedral in Lusaka, and was involved with the welfare of Rwandan former refugees, especially with their tertiary education and advocating for their local integration in Zambia.

In 2013, the South African Broadcasting Corporation broadcast a documentary called "A Helping Hand: the Story of Bishop John Osmers" as a tribute to his contribution to the liberation of South Africa.

== Death ==
Osmers died in Lusaka on 16 June 2021, from complications from COVID-19.

== Honours and awards ==
In the 2007 Queen's Birthday Honours, Osmers was appointed a Companion of the New Zealand Order of Merit, for services to the Anglican Church. In 2012, he was given a special Centennial Award in Wellington, New Zealand, by the ANC for his involvement in the anti-apartheid movement. Along with Archbishop Desmond Tutu and former President Kenneth Kaunda, Osmers received the Archbishop of Cape Town's Award for Peace with Justice in 2016.

Anglican Communion titles
| New title | Bishop of Eastern Zambia; 1995–2002 | Succeeded by William Mchombo |
