= Fanuel Magangani =

Malawian Anglican bishop

The Right Reverend Fanuel Magangani
- Bishop of Northern Malawi
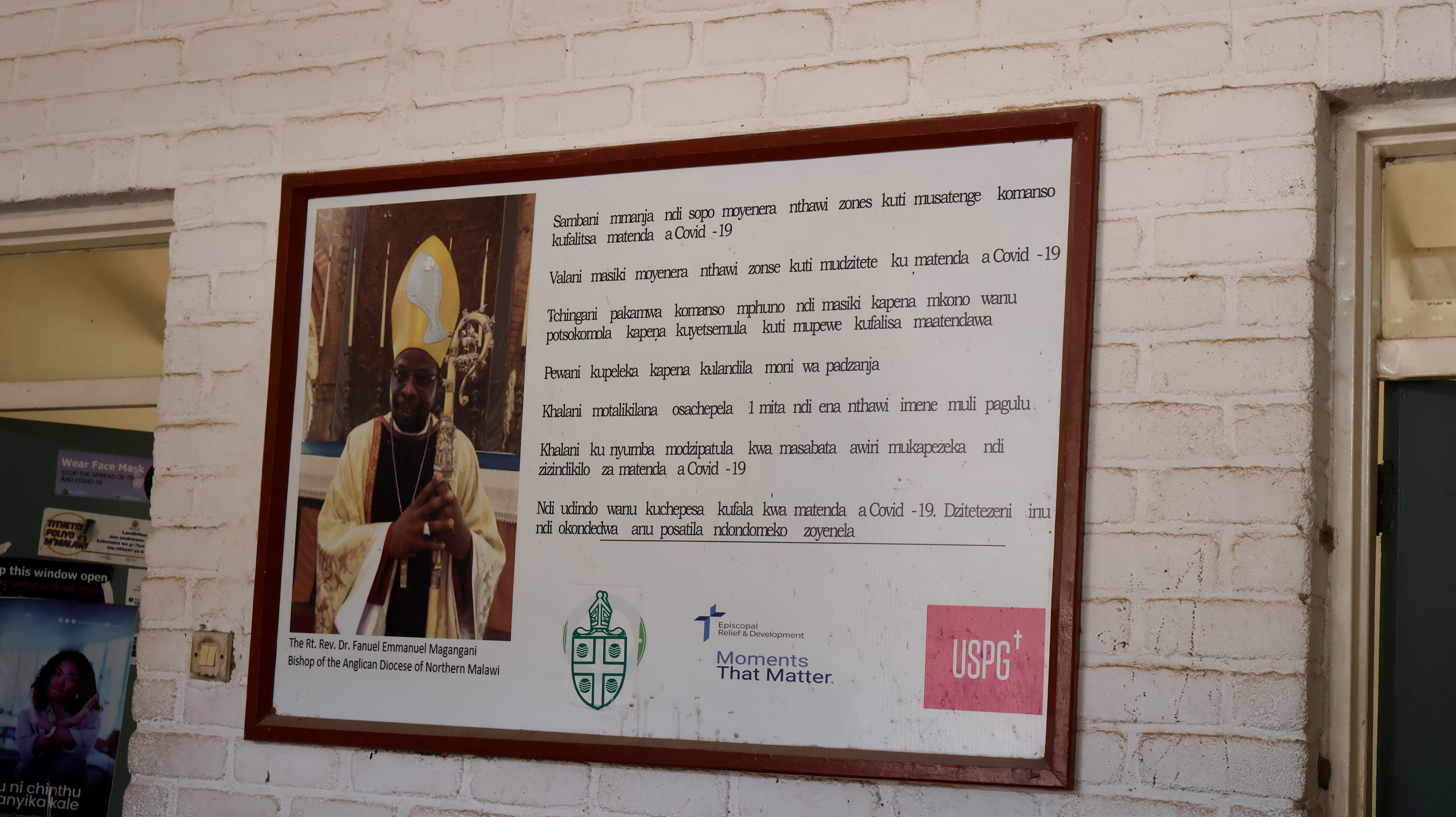
- in 2026
- Church: Church of the Province of Central Africa
- Diocese: Northern Malawi
- In office: 2010–present
- Predecessor: Christopher Boyle
- Previous post: Dean of St Peter's Cathedral, Likoma

Orders
- Ordination: 1999 (diaconate); 2000 (priesthood)
- Consecration: 7 November 2010

Personal details
- Born: 1971 or 1972 (age 54–55)
- Denomination: Anglicanism
- Education: Zomba Theological College; Mzuzu University; Nashotah House

Fanuel Emmanuel Chioko Magangani (born 1971 or 1972) is a Malawian Anglican bishop. Since 2010, he has been bishop of the Diocese of Northern Malawi in the Church of the Province of Central Africa. He was the first indigenous Malawian to become bishop of the diocese.

== Education and early ministry ==
Magangani received his education at Zomba Theological College and Mzuzu University and ordained a deacon in the Anglican church in 1999, then as a priest in 2000. He was dean of St Peter's Cathedral, Likoma, from 2003 to 2007. In 2018, he completed a doctor of ministry degree at Nashotah House.

== Episcopacy ==
In June 2010, Magangani was elected the third bishop of the Diocese of Northern Malawi. He was consecrated a bishop during a five-hour service at in Mzuzu on 7 November 2010, becoming the first indigenous African bishop of the diocese.

Under Magangani, the Bible Society of Malawi completed the translation of the New Testament into Lambya, marking the final New Testament translation project for a Malawian tribal language. (The diocese conducts services in Lambya at its church in Chitipa.) As bishop, Magangani also promoted voluntary medical male circumcision as a means of reducing the risk of HIV transmission, and he underwent the procedure himself to set an example. (Note: According to the World Health Organization, there is "strong evidence" that voluntary medical male circumcision (VMMC) can significantly reduce the risk of HIV infection.) He served as chairman of the Anglican Council in Malawi, as vice chairperson and chairperson of the Malawi Council of Churches, and as a member of the board of the Malawi Roads Authority.

In 2024, amid reports that the Malawian government was considering selling Likoma and Chizumulu islands in Lake Malawi—the heartland of Malawian Anglicanism—to a foreign investor, Magangani advocated against any sale and called on those who wished to do business in Likoma to listen to residents and respect their culture.

== Bibliography ==
- Magangani, Fanuel (2021). "The Laity as Church in the World: The Need to Equip them in their Apostolate". In Glissmann, Volker (ed.). Towards a Malawian Theology of Laity. Luviri Press. pp. 51–59. doi:10.2307/j.ctv1k76jpp. ISBN 978-99960-66-61-0. JSTOR j.ctv1k76jpp.
