= Francis Kaulanda =

Malawian Anglican bishop (born 1959)

The Right Reverend Francis Kaulanda
- Bishop of Lake Malawi
- Church: Church of the Province of Central Africa
- Diocese: Lake Malawi
- In office: 2010–2024
- Predecessor: Jameson Mwenda
- Successor: Daniel Kalonga

Orders
- Consecration: 9 May 2025

Personal details
- Born: December 29, 1959 (age 66) Likoma, Malawi
- Denomination: Anglican
- Spouse: Nelly Kaulanda
- Children: 6
- Education: Zomba Theological College

Francis Kaulanda (born 29 December 1959) is a Malawian Anglican bishop. From 2010 to 2024, he was bishop of Lake Malawi in the Church of the Province of Central Africa.

== Early life and ordained ministry ==
Kaulanda was born in 1959 on Likoma Island. After completing secondary school, he attended Zomba Theological College, graduating in 1986, and also studied at Mindolo College in Kitwe, Zambia. Following his ordination, he was a parish priest in Ntchisi, Nkhotakota and Lilongwe. He also served as diocesan youth coordinator, diocesan secretary and as archdeacon of Nkhotakota and Lilongwe in the Diocese of Lake Malawi.

== Episcopacy ==
From 2005 to 2009, the Diocese of Lake Malawi was divided in a conflict over the appointment of its bishop. Nicholas Henderson, a British priest, was elected, but his selection was vetoed by the bishops of the Province of Central Africa over his membership in Modern Church, a liberal Christian organization, and Henderson's support for same-sex blessings. For four years, the diocese was led by Jameson Mwenda, a Zambian bishop appointed by the province whose authority was challenged in court. In 2009, Henderson urged his supporters to rally behind Kaulanda as bishop. Kaulanda was elected and consecrated in May 2010.

During his episcopacy, Kaulanda celebrated the centennial of Mothers' Union in Malawi and founded Lake Malawi Anglican University. Kaulanda retired in late 2024. His retirement ceremony was presided over by Malawian Vice President Michael Usi.

== Personal life ==
Kaulanda is married to Nelly; they have six children.
