= Daniel Kalonga =

Malawian Anglican bishop

The Right Reverend Daniel Kalonga
- Bishop of Lake Malawi
- Church: Church of the Province of Central Africa
- Diocese: Lake Malawi
- In office: Since 2025
- Predecessor: Francis Kaulanda

Orders
- Consecration: 13 July 2025 by Albert Chama

Personal details
- Born: 1980 or 1981 (age 44–45)
- Denomination: Anglican

Daniel Kalonga is a Malawian Anglican bishop. Since 2025, he has been bishop of Lake Malawi in the Church of the Province of Central Africa. He hails from Ntchisi District and holds qualifications in management. He was a parish priest and vicar general of the diocese prior to his election as diocesan bishop in April 2025. Archbishop Albert Chama consecrated Kalonga a bishop in July 2025 during a service at Silver Stadium in Lilongwe attended by President Lazarus Chakwera.
