= Bernard Malango =

Zambian Anglican prelate (1941–2021)

The Most Reverend Bernard Malango
- Archbishop emeritus of Central Africa
- Church: Church of the Province of Central Africa
- Successor: Albert Chama

Orders
- Ordination: 1971
- Consecration: 1988

Personal details
- Born: 1941
- Died: 30 October 2021 (aged 79–80)

Bernard Amos Malango (1941 – 30 October 2021) was a Zambian Anglican prelate. He was the Anglican Archbishop of Central Africa from 2000 to September 2006, when he retired.

== Early life and education ==
Malango started his career as a draughtsman. He attended St John's Seminary in Lusaka, Zambia, and graduated there in 1971, obtaining a Diploma in Theology. He was later sent to Trinity College, Dublin, where he graduated with the degree of M. Phil.

== Positions held ==
He was ordained in 1971, became a priest in 1972 and was consecrated in 1988. He obtained a Master of Philosophy at University of Dublin in 1984.

From 1974 to 1988, Malango was in Malawi. He was Bishop's Chaplain in Malosa from 1974 to 1976; from 1978 to 1981 he was Executive Secretary/Treasurer of ACLCA; and from 1984 to 1988 he was Convenor in Malawi of the Islam Project in Africa.

From 1988 to 2001, he was Bishop of Northern Zambia, became Archbishop of Central Africa in 2000 until his retirement in 2006. He was also the Bishop of Upper Shire since 2001.

His office was located in Chilema, near Zomba, Malawi.

== Windsor Report ==
Malango was a member of the Lambeth Commission on Communion which drafted the Windsor Report.

His views on trying to keep the Anglican Communion together in spite of differences over homosexuality have put him at odds with other bishops in the province, specifically former bishop Nolbert Kunonga of Zimbabwe.

== Publications ==
- Christian-Muslim Dialogue in Malawi 1989

Anglican Communion titles
Preceded by Joseph Mabula	Bishop of Northern Zambia; 1988–2002	Succeeded by Albert Chama
Preceded by Walter Khotso Makhulu	Archbishop of Central Africa; 2001–2006	Succeeded by Albert Chama
New title	Bishop of Upper Shire; 2002–2006	Succeeded by Brighton Vita Malasa
