= Diocese of Northern Malawi =

Malawian diocese in the Church of the Province of Central Africa

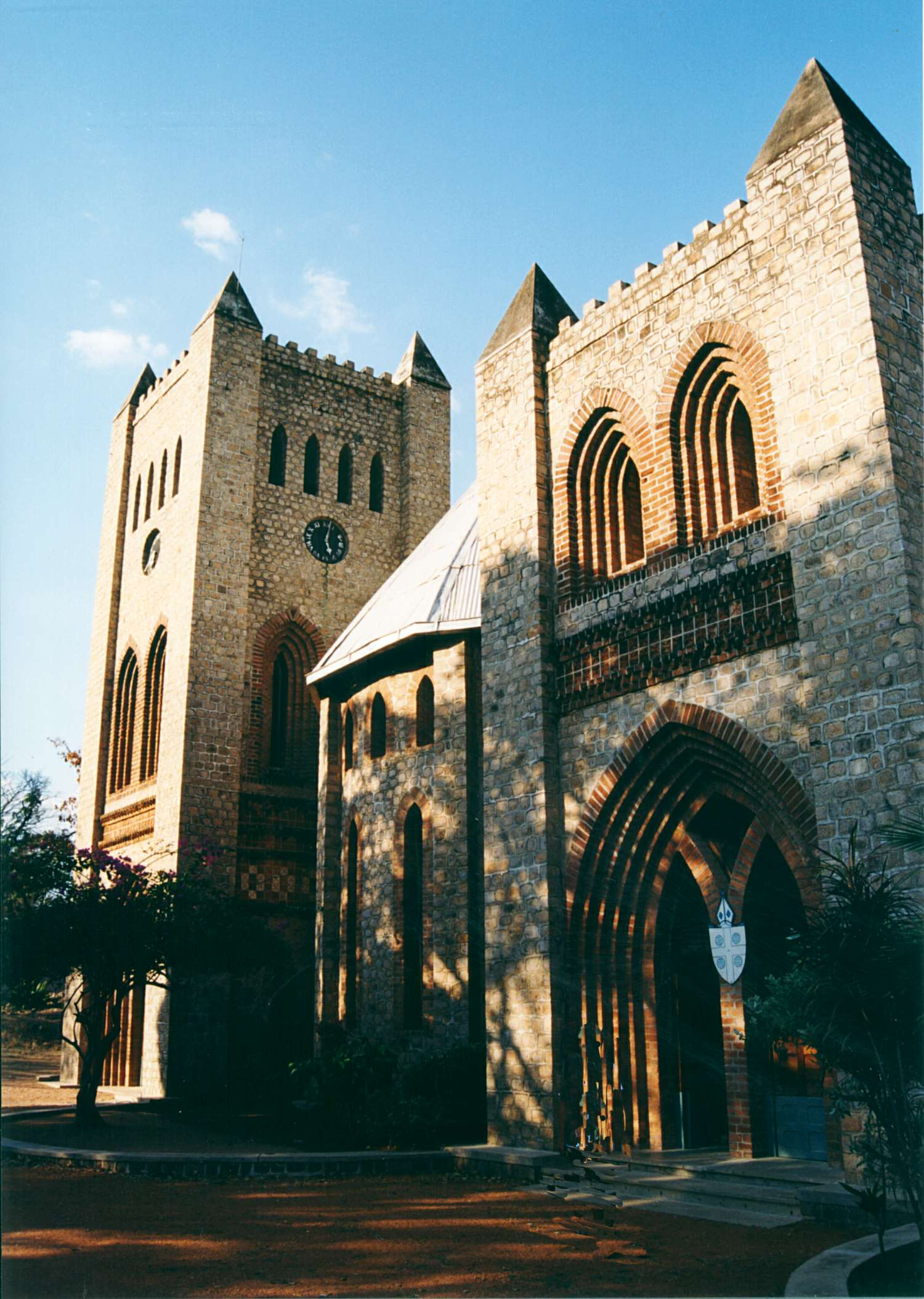
- St Peter's Cathedral on Likoma Island

Location
- Ecclesiastical province: Church of the Province of Central Africa
- Archdeaconries: 6

Statistics
- Parishes: 32

Information
- Rite: Anglican
- Established: 1995
- Cathedral: St Peter's Cathedral, Likoma

Current leadership
- Bishop: Fanuel Magangani

Map
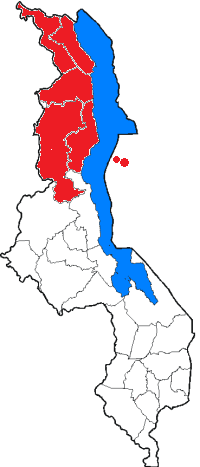
- Location of the diocese within Malawi

Website
- nmalawianglican.org

The Diocese of Northern Malawi is one of the four dioceses of the Church of the Province of Central Africa in Malawi. Its third bishop, since 2010, has been Fanuel Magangani. While the diocese itself only dates to 1995, its territory includes the heartland of Anglicanism in central Africa. The diocese's cathedral is St Peter's Cathedral on Likoma Island; it was built from 1903 to 1911 and was the hub of the Universities' Mission to Central Africa in the late 19th and early 20th centuries.

== History ==
Anglicanism in Malawi dates back to the 19th century and the missionary activity of David Livingstone and the Universities' Mission to Central Africa. It took organizational form in 1892, when the first bishop of Nyasaland was appointed with his see on Likoma Island, where St Peter's Cathedral was completed in 1911. Over the course of the 20th century, the diocese's territory narrowed to the boundaries of present-day Malawi. In 1971, the diocese was divided between the Diocese of Lake Malawi (based at Likoma) and the Diocese of Southern Malawi.

Josiah Mtekateka, who had become the first indigenous Malawian Anglican bishop when he was made suffragan bishop of Malawi in 1965, became the first diocesan bishop of Lake Malawi. Mtekateka was succeeded by Peter Nyanja in 1978, and under Mtekateka and Nyanja's indigenous Malawian leadership the diocese became more representative. Synods began to conduct business in Chewa, lay participation and women's participation in governance rose, and worship began to include locally composed hymns set to Malawian tunes.

In 1995, the Diocese of Northern Malawi was created out of the Diocese of Lake Malawi. St Peter's Cathedral became the cathedral of the northern diocese. The first bishop of the new diocese was American priest Jackson Biggers, who had served extensively in Malawi. During Biggers' tenure, a partnership was formed with the Episcopal Diocese of Fort Worth. Biggers also invited the Anglican sisters of the Community of St. Mary to establish a house in Malawi.

Biggers was succeeded by British priest Christopher Boyle, who was followed in 2010 by Fanuel Magangani, the diocese's first indigenous African bishop. Under Magangani, the Bible Society of Malawi completed the translation of the New Testament into Lambya, marking the final New Testament translation project for a Malawian tribal language. The diocese conducts services in Lambya at its church in Chitipa.

In 2023, the Church of the Province of Central Africa approved plans for the Malawian dioceses to become recognized as an autonomous province of the Anglican Communion. As part of these plans, the Diocese of Northern Malawi would be divided into two. These plans were announced in 2026, with Likoma and Chizumulu islands set to form the new Diocese of Likoma. A new bishop was scheduled to be elected in 2026, with his installation to take place by the beginning of 2027.

== Bishops of Northern Malawi ==
No.	Name	Dates	Notes
1	Jackson Biggers	1995–2000	
2	Christopher Boyle	2001–2009	Translated to Leicester
3	Fanuel Magangani	Since 2010	

== Companion dioceses ==
- The Diocese of Birmingham in the Church of England
- (United States) The Diocese of Dallas in the Episcopal Church
- (United States) The Diocese of Fort Worth in the Anglican Church in North America
