= Diocese of Luapula =

The Diocese of Luapula is one of five dioceses in Zambia within the Church of the Province of Central Africa: the current bishop is Robert Mumbi.
