= Peter Nyanja =

Malawian Anglican bishop (1940–2005)

The Right Reverend Peter Nyanja
- Bishop of Lake Malawi
- Church: Church of the Province of Central Africa
- Diocese: Lake Malawi
- In office: 1978–2005
- Predecessor: Josiah Mtekateka
- Successor: Jameson Mwenda

Orders
- Ordination: 1972 (priesthood)
- Consecration: 25 June 1978 by Donald Arden

Personal details
- Born: 1940 Ntchisi, Malawi
- Died: March 8, 2005 (aged 64–65) Lilongwe, Malawi
- Denomination: Anglican
- Children: 9

Peter Nathaniel Nyanja (1940 – 8 March 2005) was a Malawian Anglican bishop. From 1978 until his death in 2005, he was the second bishop of Lake Malawi in the Church of the Province of Central Africa.

== Biography ==
Nyanja was born in 1940 in Ntchisi to non-Christian parents. He converted to Christianity in 1962 while studying at a teacher training college and came to the attention of Bishop Donald Arden and trained for ordination in Tanzania and Zambia.

He was ordained a priest in 1972 and appointed archdeacon of Nkhotakota in 1977. Not long after, he was appointed the second bishop of Lake Malawi, succeeding Josiah Mtekateka, in 1978. Nyanja's election was controversial; clergy from Likoma Island, the heartland of Malawian Anglicanism, opposed the election of a mainlander and boycotted the elective assembly. After no candidate achieved the required two-thirds support, the election was sent to the bishops of the Province of Central Africa, who selected Nyanja. Nyanja was consecrated at All Saints Church in Nkhotakota in June 1978, but due to objections from Likomans, Nyanja was not enthroned at St Peter's Cathedral until January 1979.

During his episcopacy, Nyanja angered Anglicans in Nkhotakota by relocating the diocesan headquarters to Lilongwe. He chaired the Malawi Council of Churches during the 1980s. According to future bishop Alinafe Kalemba, whom Nyanja confirmed in 1981, Nyanja began his episcopacy with an administrative focus, but after experiencing spiritual renewal in the 1990s, he grew into a role of spiritual fatherhood later in his tenure.

He died of prostate cancer at Kamuzu Central Hospital in Lilongwe on 8 March 2005, a few months before his planned retirement as bishop.
