= Christopher Boyle =

English Anglican bishop

The Right Reverend Christopher Boyle
- Bishop of Northern Malawi
- Church: Church of England; Church of the Province of Central Africa
- Diocese: Northern Malawi
- In office: 2001 – 2009
- Predecessor: Jackson Biggers
- Successor: Fanuel Magangani
- Other post: Assistant Bishop of Leicester (2009–2017)

Orders
- Ordination: 1976 (deacon); 1977 (priest)
- Consecration: 22 April 2001

Personal details
- Born: 8 November 1951 (age 74) Birmingham, Warwickshire, United Kingdom
- Denomination: Anglican
- Education: King's College London

Christopher John Boyle AKC (born 8 November 1951) is a retired Anglican bishop. He was Bishop of Northern Malawi in the Church of the Province of Central Africa (2001–2009) and the last Assistant Bishop of Leicester in the Church of England (2009–2017).

== Early life and priestly career ==
Born and raised in Birmingham, Boyle studied at King's College London and was ordained a deacon in the Church of England in 1976. He was ordained priest a year later, one year into serving his four-year title as assistant curate at Emmanuel, Wylde Green. In 1980, Boyle became Chaplain to Hugh Montefiore, Bishop of Birmingham until 1983, when he became Rector at St Mary and St Margaret, Castle Bromwich. While in Castle Bromwich, he also served as Area Dean of Coleshill (1992–1999), Priest-in-charge at All Saints, Shard End (1996–1997) and Honorary Canon of St Philip's Cathedral, Birmingham (from 1996), until his emigration in 2001.

== Episcopal career ==
In 2001, he became an Anglican bishop when he was consecrated Bishop of Northern Malawi, following his 2000 election to the post. He served in Africa for eight years before resigning to return to Britain – his successor as diocesan bishop was the first African bishop to serve in that role. He became Assistant Bishop of Leicester, and the first full-time stipendiary assistant bishop, acting as if a suffragan bishop, in the Diocese of Leicester, upon his installation on 6 September 2009. He retired effective 31 May 2017.

== Styles ==
- The Reverend Christopher Boyle (1976–1996)
- The Reverend Canon Christopher Boyle (1996–2001)
- The Right Reverend Christopher Boyle (2001–present)

Anglican Communion titles
| Preceded by Jackson Biggers | Bishop of Northern Malawi; 2001–2009 | Succeeded by Fanuel Magangani |
| Vacant Title last held by John Austin | Assistant Bishop of Leicester; 2009–2017 | Succeeded by Guli Francis-Dehqani as Bishop of Loughborough |
