= Ishmael Mukuwanda =

Zimbabwean Anglican bishop

Ishmael Mukuwanda is an Anglican bishop in Zimbabwe: he was Bishop of Central Zimbabwe until 2018 when he was succeeded by Ignatius Makumbe.
