= Jameson Mwenda =

Malawian-Zambian Anglican bishop (1939–2016)

The Right Reverend Jameson Mwenda
- Bishop of Lusaka
- Church: Church of the Province of Central Africa
- Diocese: Lusaka
- Predecessor: Filemon Mataka
- Successor: David Njovu
- Other post: Bishop of Lake Malawi

Personal details
- Born: 10 May 1939 Malawi
- Died: December 6, 2016 (aged 77) Lusaka, Zambia
- Denomination: Anglican

Leonard Jameson Mwenda (10 May 1939 – 6 December 2016) was a Malawi-born Zambian Anglican bishop. He was bishop of Lusaka in the Church of the Province of Central Africa, after which he was appointed bishop of Lake Malawi.
