= Oliver Green-Wilkinson =

Anglican bishop (1913–1970)

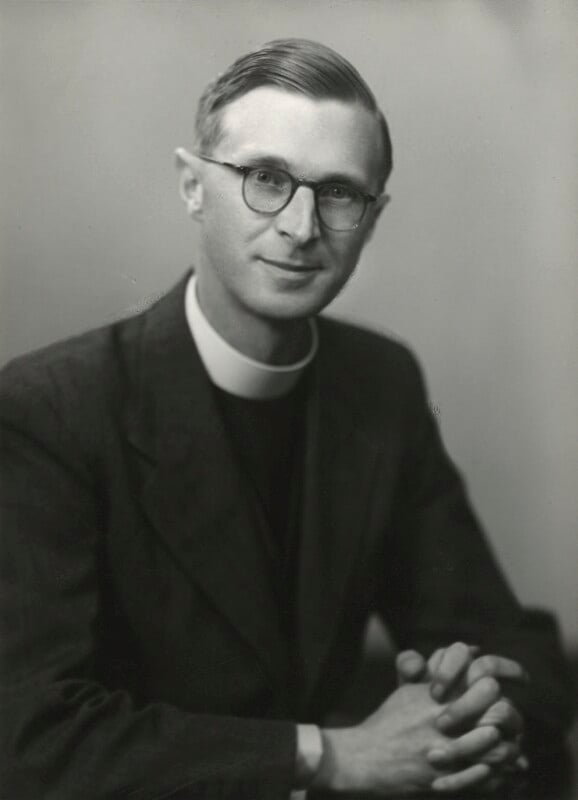
Green-Wilkinson in 1951

Francis Oliver Green-Wilkinson CBE MC (called Oliver; 7 May 1913 – 26 August 1970) was an eminent Anglican bishop in the third quarter of the 20th century.

== Early life and education ==
Green-Wilkinson was born on 7 May 1913 in the Rectory at Aston Tirrold, the second of five children of Rev. Lumley Green Wilkinson and Myfanwy, daughter of Sir Francis Edwards, 1st Baronet. His paternal grandfather was Lieutenant-General Frederick Green-Wilkinson.

He was educated at Eton and Magdalen College, Oxford.

== Career ==
On 15 November 1939, Green-Wilkinson joined the Oxfordshire and Buckinghamshire Light Infantry as a private.

Having served with the King's Royal Rifle Corps, he was made deacon at Michaelmas 1946 (22 September) by Edmund Morgan, Bishop of Southampton, and ordained priest on Trinity Sunday 1947 (1 June) by Mervyn Haigh, Bishop of Winchester—both times at Winchester Cathedral. His first post was as a curate at St Mary, Southampton, after which he was on the staff of St Alban's Cathedral, Pretoria until his appointment to the episcopate as the 4th Bishop of Northern Rhodesia in 1951. He was consecrated as a bishop on St Andrew's Day 1951 (30 November) by Geoffrey Fisher, Archbishop of Canterbury, at Westminster Abbey. After eleven years he was additionally elected Archbishop of Central Africa. A fierce opponent of apartheid and a naturalised Zambian, he was killed in a car crash whilst being driven back the 400 miles from Katete to Lusaka by a very steady African driver who had frequently driven him long distances. As was quite usual, Green-Wilkinson decided to do some work during the journey, and retrieved for his briefcase from the back seat. As he reached for his seat-belt, a tyre burst, the car swerved, Green-Wilkinson was thrown out of the car, and his head hit a tree.

Anglican Communion titles
Preceded by Robert Selby Taylor	Bishop of Northern Rhodesia; 1951–1970	Succeeded by Filemon Mataka as Bishop of Lusaka
Preceded by James Hughes	Archbishop of Central Africa; 1962–1970	Succeeded by Donald Arden
