= Godfrey Tawonezvi =

Godfrey Tawonezvi is an Anglican bishop in Zimbabwe: he has been the inaugural Bishop of Masvingo since 2002.
