= Titus Zhenje =

Zimbabwean Anglican bishop

Titus Zhenje (1946 – 1998) was an Anglican bishop in Zimbabwe.

Zhenje was ordained deacon in 1972 and priest in 1973. He served in Zimbabwe, but had two years at Roath from 1980 to 1981. He was Bishop of Central Zimbabwe from 1996 until his death.
