= Brighton Vita Malasa =

Excommunicated Malawian bishop

- Bishop of Upper Shire
- Church: Church of the Province of Central Africa
- Diocese: Upper Shire
- Elected: December 2008
- In office: 2009–2022
- Quashed: October 2022
- Predecessor: Bernard Malango
- Successor: William Mchombo
- Previous posts: Dean of Sts. Peter and Paul Cathedral Church

Orders
- Consecration: 7 June 2009
- Laicized: 23 October 2022

Personal details
- Born: 1975 or 1976 (age 49–50)

Brighton Vita Malasa is a Malawian former Anglican bishop. He was the second bishop of the Diocese of Upper Shire in the Church of the Province of Central Africa from 2009 until his excommunication in 2022.

== Episcopacy ==
Malasa, the vicar general of the diocese, was elected bishop of Upper Shire by the episcopal synod of the province in 2008 after six votes at the diocesan level failed to achieve the required two-thirds majority. He was consecrated a bishop in 2009.

Under Malasa, the diocese participated in the Gates Foundation-funded Health Population Project and observed August 25, 2013, as "a special day for teaching people on the effects of overpopulation." Malasa also promoted tree planting as part of the diocese's environmental stewardship activities. In 2016, Beautify Malawi Trust patron Gertrude Mutharika announced a K3.5 million (US$4874.62) donation to the diocese for its tree-planting activities.

Malasa's 14-year tenure also included significant controversy. In 2019, with some members of the diocese seeking Malasa's ouster over charges of abuse of power and financial impropriety, Malasa called police on his critics within the diocese. Later that year, 39 of 41 parishes in the diocese signed a petition alleging corruption, harassment and "maladministration" and demanding the bishop's resignation. In response, Malasa excommunicated 28 priests and additional laity who had opposed his decisions. He later reversed this action after consulting with Archbishop Albert Chama. Protests against Malasa continued throughout 2020 and 2021. Malasa refused to resign without receiving a K1 billion (US$1053697.48) severance package.

On 23 October 2022, Chama excommunicated Malasa under the canons of the church for refusing to meet with him over the charges, which in addition to financial impropriety also included adultery. In 2023, the Blantyre High Court rejected a legal claim made by Malasa to overturn his excommunication.
