= Likoma Secondary School =

Coordinates: 12.0373°S 34.7266°E

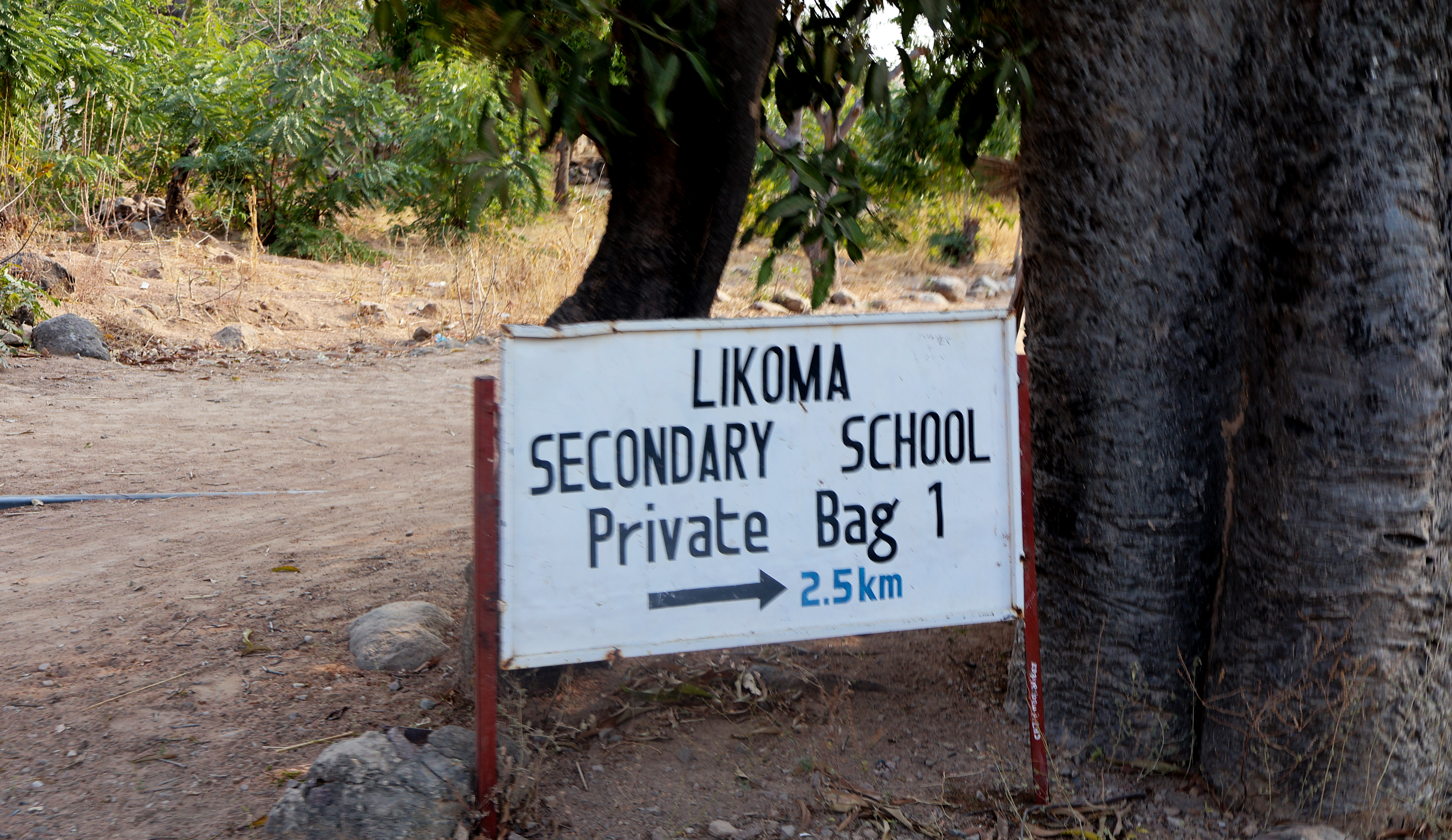

Location
- Blantyre; Malawi

Information
- Other name: BSS
- School district: Likoma District

Likoma Secondary School is the secondary school on the Malawian island of Likoma. It was established in the 1960s in the grounds that had been Saint Michael Teachers’ Training College.

== History ==
The site of the school was home to a theological school and there is a church (St Michaels) in the school's grounds. Saint Michael Teachers’ Training College had originally been at Kango in Mozambique but the college had moved after the Principal was murdered. Josiah Mtekateka who was born in 1903 and who became the first Malawian Anglican bishop in 1965 had his secondary education on Likoma Island. The theology school was converted into a school for children during the term of the first President of Malawi following independence in 1964.

In 2018 successful top student Mercy Saidi was awarded a scholarship by the Diocese of Northern Malawi. She was 21 years old and she had been accepted to study at Kamuzu College of Nursing. She was said to be the first student "in decades" to achieve this level of academic success. The scholarship was important as her family could not afford to send her to train as a nurse.

The government supported school provides free secondary education (from 2026) to those students who do well at their primary schools. In 2021 there were 40 girls who were successful. The girls and their teachers were given prizes.

The school is on an island and this has resulted in students not having libraries, internet access or enough teachers.

== Alumni ==
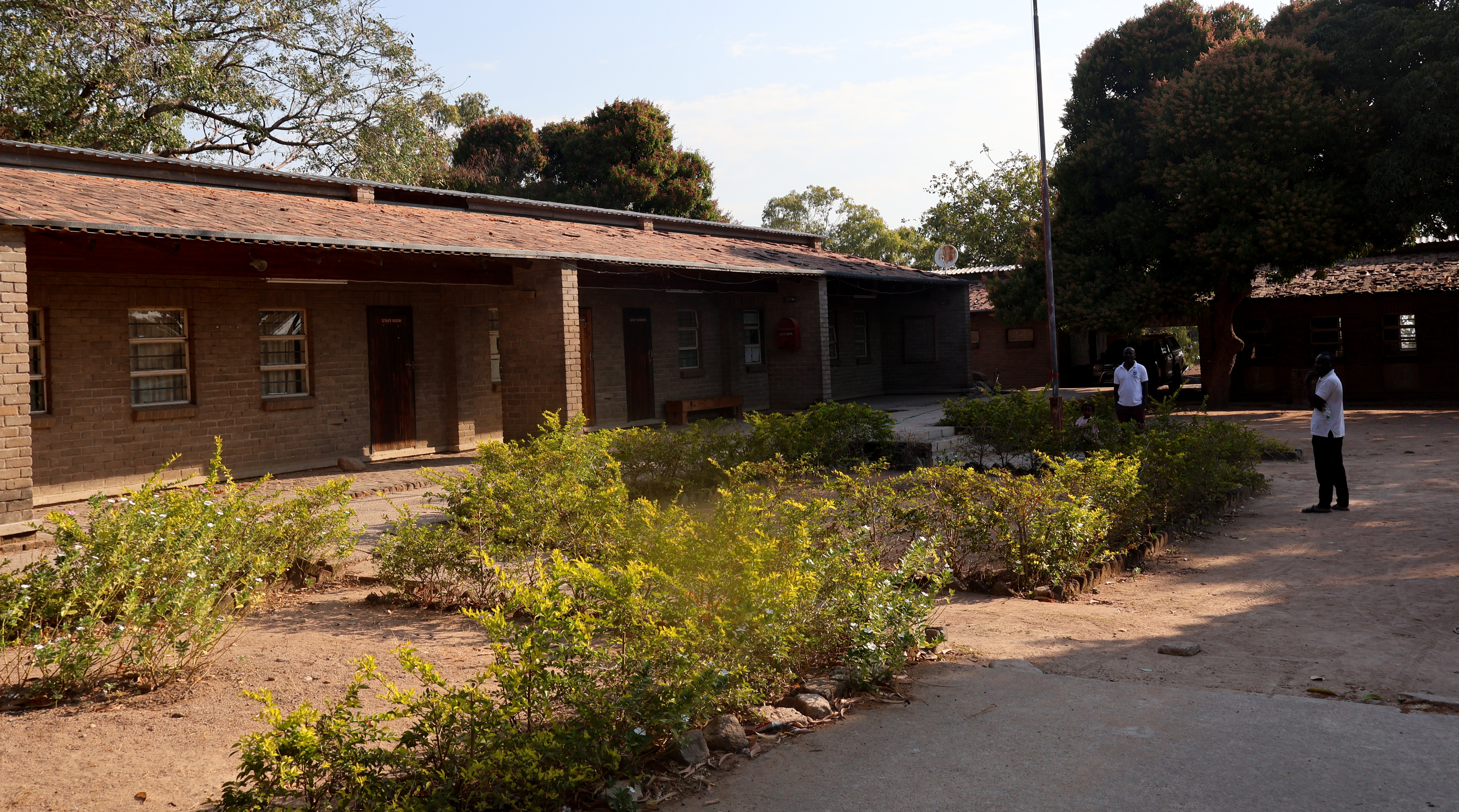
Classrooms at Likoma Secondary School

The school has an Alumni Organisation. In 2017, it had 150 members who intended to fund students from the school who needed help to undertake tertiary education.
