= Malosa (Malawi) =

Small trading centre in the Zomba District of Malawi

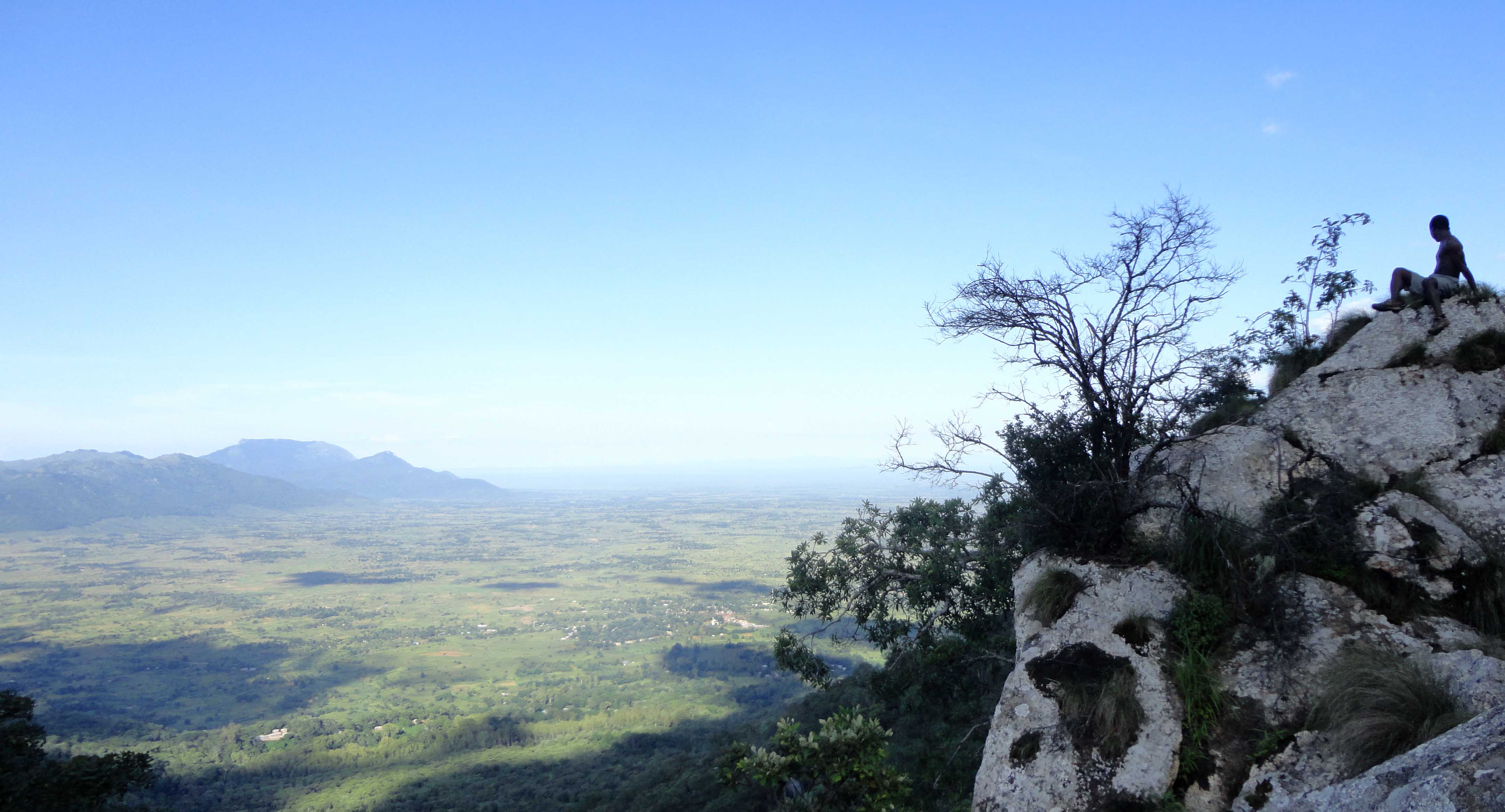
Malosa Mountain, Malawi

Malosa is a small trading centre located in the Zomba District of Malawi. The Malosa mountain range and plateau neighbours the more famous Zomba Plateau and is separated by the Domasi Valley. Malosa is on the M3, 27 km from the city of Zomba. The earth road from the trading post leads from the edge of the main road right up to the base of the Malosa mountain range.

== History ==
Malosa is dominated by the Anglican Church Mission. Following a request from David Livingstone, the first missionaries arrived 80 kilometres (50 mi) away at Magomero in 1861. The Protectorate of Nyasaland was formed in 1891 with only one Anglican diocese (there are now four). A mission station, named Likwenu, after the river flowing from Malosa Mountain, was established on the slopes of the mountain in 1910 and a hospital opened there in 1913. In 1963 Bishop Donald Arden established the headquarters of the Diocese at Malosa, it having previously been on Likoma Island and at Mponda's. In 1971 the Diocese was divided into two, the Diocese of Southern Malawi in the south and the Diocese of Lake Malawi in the centre and north. In 2002 the Diocese of Southern Malawi divided into two and the Diocese of Upper Shire came into being with its headquarters at Malosa. The Right Reverend Bernard Amos Malango became the first Bishop of Upper Shire in 2002 succeeded by the Right Reverend Brighton Vitta Malasa, became Bishop in 2009 and had his diocesan offices at the foot of the mountain. Malasa was excommunicated from the church in 2022 and was succeeded by Right Reverend William Mchombo who was the Bishop of Eastern Zambia.

== Governance ==
Grace Kwelepeta, who is a former teacher, was elected to be Zomba Malosa's member of the National Assembly in 2019.

== Geography ==
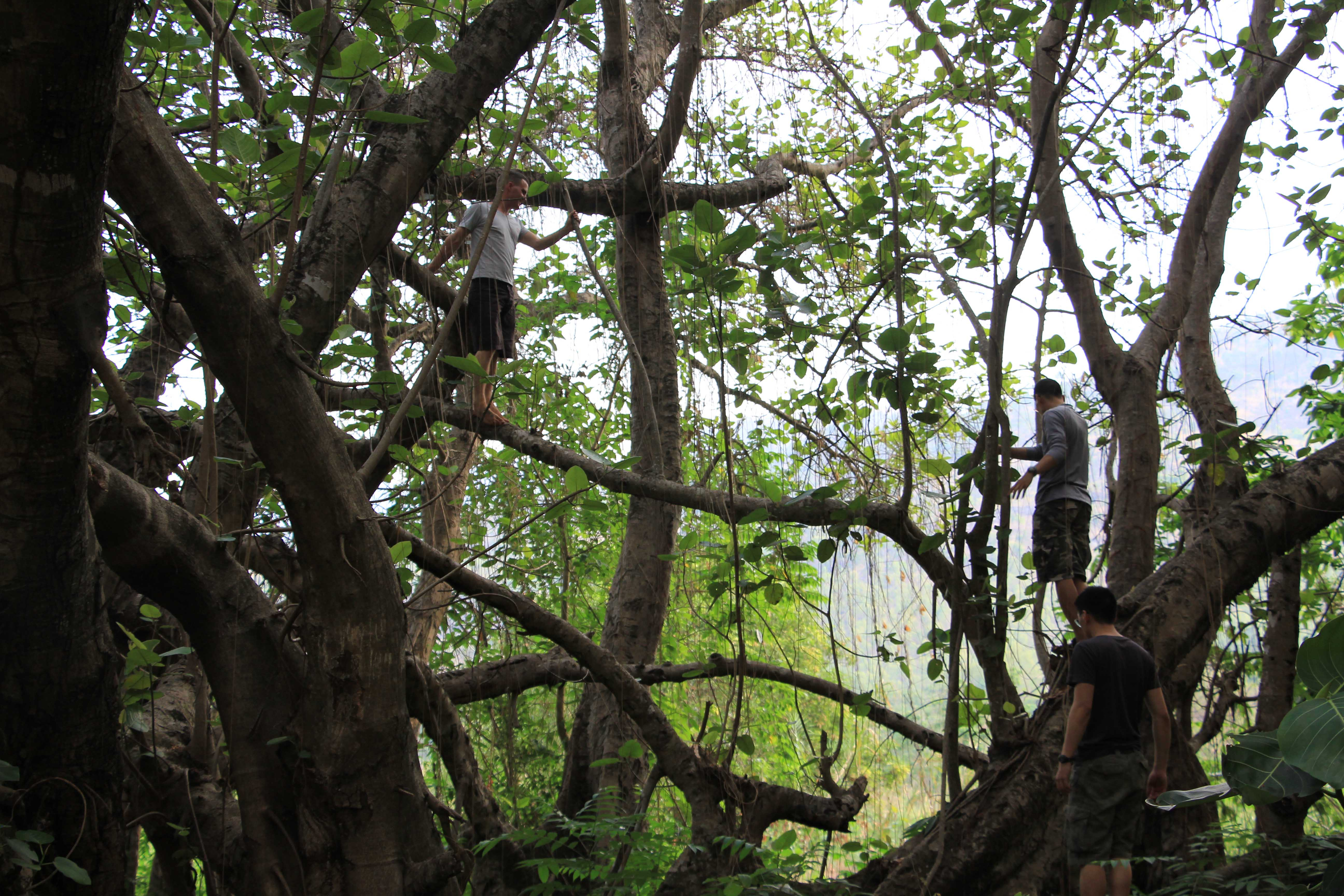
Chilema Tree, Malosa, Malawi

Located in Malosa is an area called Chilema. 'Chilema' in Chichewa (the local language) means 'disabled' or 'deformed' and this area gets its name from two natural phenomena. Firstly a stream that starts at the top of Malosa Mountain but as it flows down it gets smaller and disappears at the point of Chilema. Secondly a tree, the Chilema Tree, which is a single tree that looks like an entire forest. It is impossible to find the original trunk of the tree as the whole area is a vast interconnected mesh of woven trunks. For the first few years in the life of the Chilema Ecumenical Lay Training Centre its chapel was under the tree. The stone altar is still there.

=== Malosa Forest Reserve ===
Malosa Forest Reserve is a protected forest in Malawi. It is under the authority of The Ministry of Environment and Climate Change Management. In 2013 Malosa Forest Reserve became part of a Zomba-Malosa-Liwonde forest management plan, splitting all the forestry reserves into 26 blocks. The Malosa forest blocks are managed by Nkalo Forest Block of Traditional Authority Nkula.

=== Malosa Mountain and Plateau ===
Malosa peak stands 6,816 feet and has gently rounded slopes. Malosa plateau lies at 6,000-6,600 feet and is covered in grasses and trees. Walks up the mountain and on the plateau can be found along the paths used by the illegal charcoal producers. On the peaks of the Malosa range there are views of the Shire river, Lake Chilwa, and the Chikala, Chaone, and Mongolowe hills. There are also many interesting insects and flora with butterfly collectors frequently collecting specimens there.

The alkaline pegmatites of the Zomba and Malosa mountains are famous for their unique geology and mineralogy. The mineral specimens of aegirines, arfvedsonite and feldspars are some of the best in the world.

== Landmarks ==
=== Chilema Ecumenical Training and Conference Centre ===
The Chilema Ecumenical Training and Conference Centre (CETCC), previously known as The United Church Lay Training Centre, is a non-profit institution. The CETCC is a dream of the CCAP (Church of Central Africa, Presbyterian) Blantyre Synod and the Anglican Diocese of Malawi, then the Diocese of Southern Malawi. The centres inception dates back to 1962 through the leadership of Reverend Jonathan Sangaya of the CCAP and the Rt. Reverend Bishop Donald Arden of the Anglican Diocese. Land was donated by the Anglican Diocese and is owned by the trustees of the centre. The CETCC was officially opened in 1967 although the Capacity Building Leadership Training Programmes started in 1964.

=== St Luke's Hospital ===
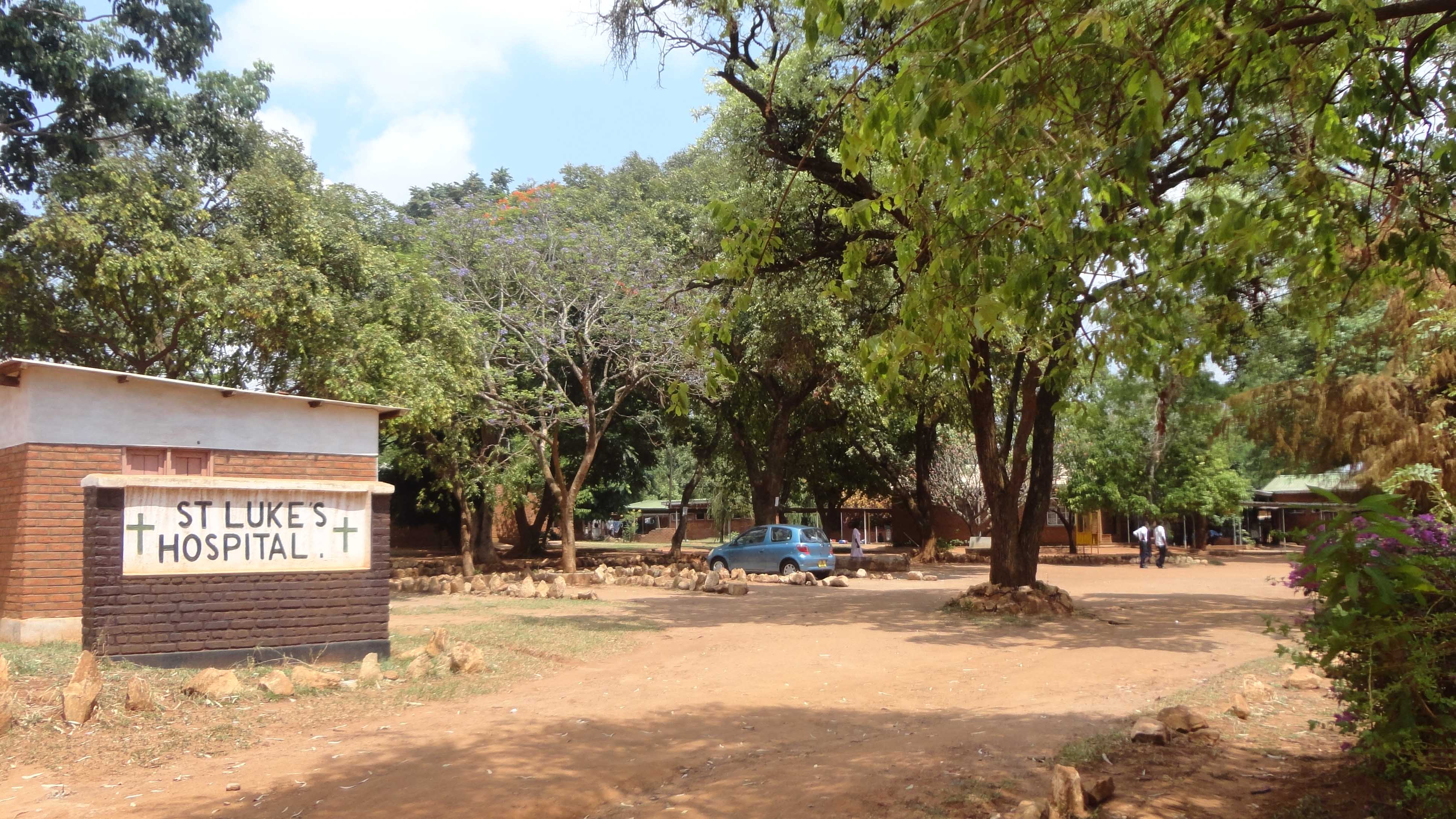
St Luke's Hospital, Malosa, Malawi

The first hospital was opened in 1913 at the site of the Likwenu Mission Station adjoining the Likwenu River. The buildings of the original hospital can still be found in the undergrowth at the foot of the mountain. St Luke's Hospital is located nearer the main road and was established in 1964 by Bishop Donald Arden. His wife Jane drew the plans for all the buildings at the hospital and Nursing School until 1981 and supervised their construction. The population of the catchment area is more than 90,000. The hospital has 145 general and maternity beds and provides surgery and dental treatment as well as staffing 5 outreach clinics that visit villages on a monthly basis.

St Luke's Health Centres:

- Chilipa and Nkasala health centres, Zomba District
- Mposa and Gawanani health centres, Machinga District
- Matope health centre, Neno District

St Luke's Hospital sits under the umbrella organisation of the Christian Health Association of Malawi (CHAM) which provides 37% of health services in the country and trains up to 80% of its health workers.

==== Controversy ====
In 2008 Tanzania-born Thadeo Mac’osano was arrested for using unauthorised drugs on 20 patients with incurable tumours. Mac’osano's application to run the trial for the drugs on humans was rejected in 2006 because he did not adhere to international standards protecting the rights of the patients, however the trials went ahead.

=== St Luke's College of Nursing and Midwifery ===
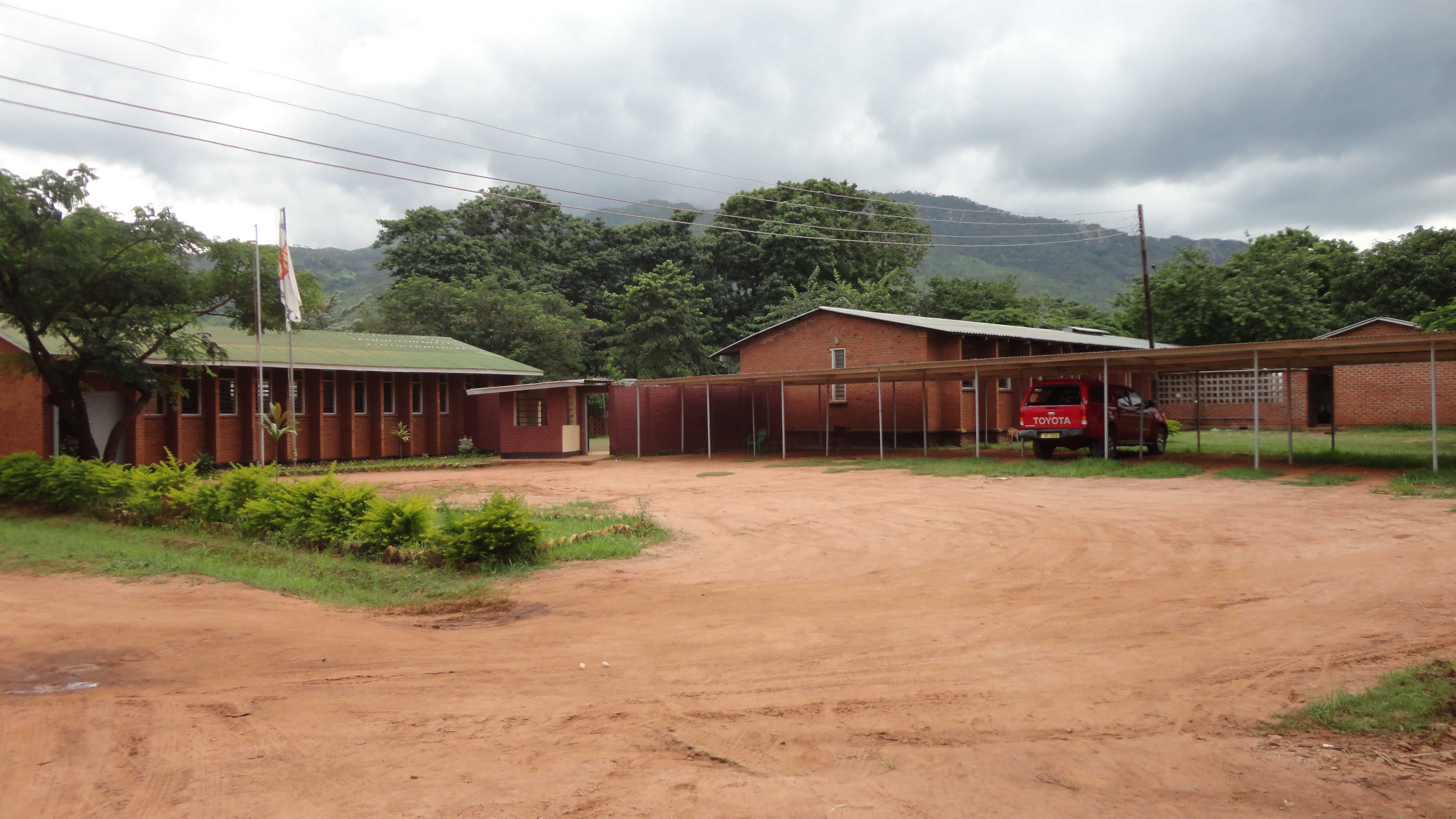
St Luke's College of Nursing and Midwifery, Malosa, Malawi

The Anglican Diocese of Southern Malawi opened Malosa Nursing School in 1972 with Miss Augusta Black and her sister Brenda Black as its first tutors. It is now called St Luke's College of Nursing and Midwifery and trains Nurse Midwife Technicians (NMTs) and Community Midwife Technicians (CMTs). The college has over 300 students and sending students for clinical practice to the following healthcare institutions:

- St Luke's Hospital Malosa
- Machinga District Hospital
- Mangochi District Hospital
- Balaka District Hospital
- Salima District Hospital
- Zomba Central Hospital
- Zomba Mental Hospital

=== Malosa Secondary School ===
Malosa Secondary School is under the Anglican Diocese of the Upper Shire and is a National Grant-Aided Boarding School. It was built in 1928 in the grounds of an old tobacco farm and was initially a teacher training college. The school has a capacity for 700 students studying form 1 through to form 4. Its alumni include the architect Maliam Mdoko.

== Yao tribe ==
The main single tribe found in Malosa is the Yao tribe. The Yao were subsistence farmers on the southeastern coast of Africa where they made contact with Arab settlers. The greater Yao chief Mataka rejected Christianity and accepted Islam. Today the majority of Yao in Malosa still follow Islam. The Yao speak a Bantu language called Chiyao; however they also speak Chichewa, the national language of Malawi.

== Notable people ==
Janet Chikaya Banda was born here in 1970 and went on to be the first woman to be Malawi's Solicitor General.
