= Maliam Mdoko =

Malawian architect

- Education: University of Malawi
- Occupation: Architect
- Employer: Press Trust

Malium Mdoko is a Malawian architect and a Rotarian. She was one of the first three Malawian women to qualify as architects. She was the first woman to be elected President of the Malawi Institute of Architects. She is employed by a trust which creates buildings for public benefit.

== Life ==
Mdoko was the first born of her parent's seven children. She completed her compulsory education and in 1992 she was selected to study in Zomba at Malosa Secondary School. Her success there led to the University of Malawi where she obtained an Architectural Technology diploma. She joined Kanjere and Associates and after four years away she returned in 2001 to take a three year architectural degree. That class was remarkable as the first three Malawian women to become architects were all in that year. Her education was not complete as she had further exams and training to complete before she could became a qualified architect in 2009.

In 2010 she started work at at the Press Trust as a Projects Officer. The Press Trust is an unusual organisation established by a 1995 Act of Parliament. Its projects are focused on public benefit. The trust works to improve buildings for housing, education, health and social care. In 2018 she designed a police station for Blantyre's Chapima Heights funded by the Press Trust.

She was still working at the Press Trust charity as the COVID-19 pandemic ended. Kim Chakanetsa of the BBC noted the different reaction to the pandemic where crowded markets had made social distancing and hand hygiene more difficult. Mdoko thought women would take the lead as stairs and elevators inside public spaces were redesigned. Mdoko was elected in 2017 to be the first woman to become President of the Malawi Institute of Architects.

Mdoko is a member of the Lilongwe Rotary Club. She was congratulated by the club when Chitipi School in Lilongwe had a new building constructed in 22 weeks during 2024. The work was supported by Rotary clubs in Lilongwe and Northampton in the UK.
