= 1992 Malawian general election =

- 26–27 June 1992
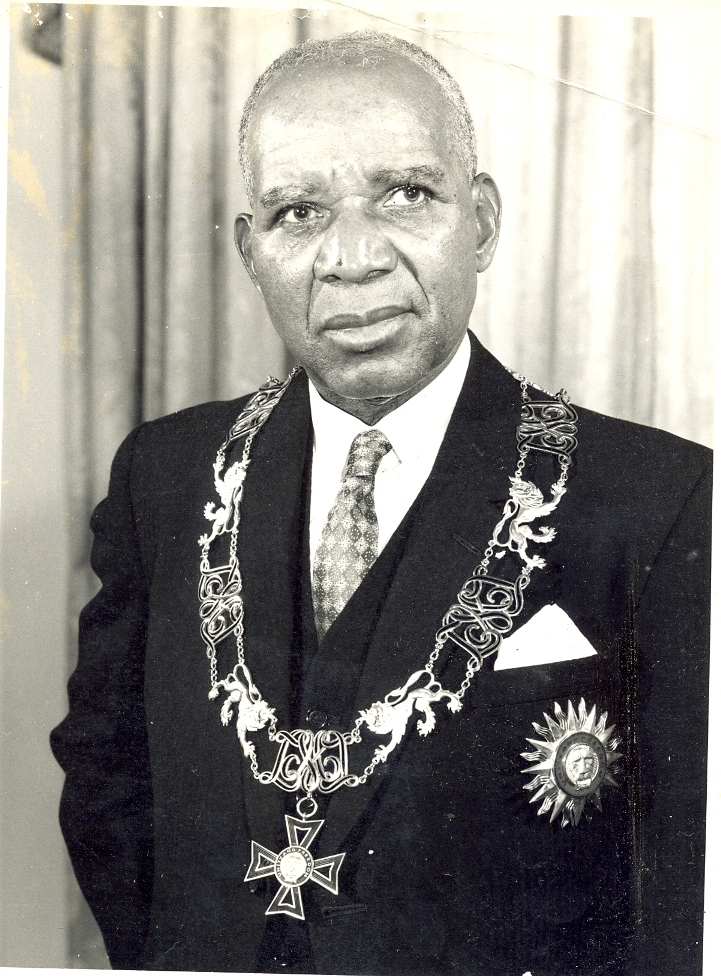
	First party
Leader	Hastings Banda
Party	MCP
Last election	102
Seats won	141
Seat change	▲29
President before election
Hastings Banda
MCP
Elected President
Hastings Banda
MCP

General elections were held in Malawi on 26 and 27 June 1992. the Malawi Congress Party was the sole legal party at the time, the country having become a one-party state in 1966. Voter turnout was reported to be 80% by the government, but was actually around 40%. 62 incumbents lost their seats.

== Campaign ==
The number of seats in the National Assembly was increased to 141, with president for life Hastings Banda able to appoint as many additional members as he saw fit to "enhance the representative character of the Assembly, or to represent particular minority or other special interests in the Republic."

In total, 275 candidates contested the 141 seats, although in 45 there was only a single MCP candidate, who was elected unopposed. All prospective candidates were vetted by Banda after being nominated by MCP committees, and had to declare their allegiance to Banda in order to be allowed to stand.

== Results ==
Party	Votes	%	Seats	+/–
Malawi Congress Party			141	+29
Appointed members			10	–1
Total			151	+28
Total votes	859,318	–		
Registered voters/turnout	2,203,103	39.00		
Source: African Elections Database, IPU

== Aftermath ==
In 1993, a year into the new legislature's term, a referendum on returning to multi-party democracy was held which saw voters end the MCP's 27-year monopoly on power. As a result, the elections initially scheduled for 1997 were brought forward to 1994.
