= Filemon Mataka =

Filemon Mataka was an Anglican bishop in Zambia in the second half of the 20th century: he was the first African bishop in the Church of the Province of Central Africa.

Mataka was born in 1909 at Msoro. He was ordained deacon in 1941 and priest in 1943. After service as a priest in the Diocese of Northern Rhodesia he was appointed the Suffragan Bishop of Zambia in 1964 and the Archdeacon of Eastern Zambia in 1966. He was priest in charge of St Peter, Lusaka from 1966 to 1969. In 1970 he was appointed Bishop of Zambia and in 1971 he was appointed the first Bishop of Lusaka.
