= Diocese of Lake Malawi =

Malawian diocese of the Church of the Province of Central Africa

Location
- Country: Malawi
- Ecclesiastical province: Central Africa

Statistics
- Parishes: 57
- Schools: 100

Information
- Rite: Anglican
- Established: 1971
- Cathedral: All Saints Cathedral, Nkhotakota
- Secular priests: 64

Current leadership
- Bishop: Daniel Kalonga
- Dean: Petros Mzokomera

Map
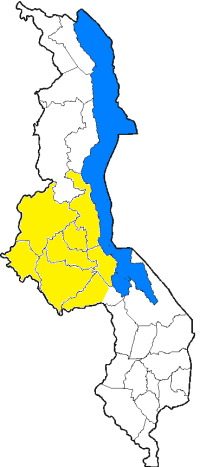
- Location of the diocese within Malawi

Website
- anglicandioceseoflakemalawi.org

The Diocese of Lake Malawi is a diocese of the Anglican Church of the Province of Central Africa. One of the church's four dioceses in Malawi, it was formed in 1971 when the Diocese of Malawi split into the Diocese of Southern Malawi and the Diocese of Lake Malawi. Today it covers the central part of the country, including the capital Lilongwe, and its see city is Nkhotakota.

== History ==
Anglicanism in Malawi dates back to the 19th century and the missionary activity of David Livingstone and the Universities' Mission to Central Africa. It took organizational form in 1892, when the first bishop of Nyasaland was appointed with his see on Likoma Island, where St Peter's Cathedral was completed in 1911. Over the course of the 20th century, the diocese's territory narrowed to the boundaries of present-day Malawi. In 1971, the diocese was divided between the Diocese of Lake Malawi (based at Likoma) and the Diocese of Southern Malawi.

Josiah Mtekateka, who had become the first indigenous Malawian Anglican bishop when he was made suffragan bishop of Malawi in 1965, became the first diocesan bishop of Lake Malawi. Mtekateka was succeeded by Peter Nyanja in 1978, and under Mtekateka and Nyanja's indigenous Malawian leadership the diocese became more representative. Synods began to conduct business in Chewa, lay participation and women's participation in governance rose, and worship began to include locally composed hymns set to Malawian tunes.

In 1995, the Diocese of Northern Malawi was created out of the Diocese of Lake Malawi. St Peter's Cathedral on Likoma became the cathedral of the northern diocese, while All Saints Church in Nkhotakota was designated the new cathedral for the continuing diocese.

In 2005, the diocese became a flashpoint in conflicts over homosexuality in the Anglican Communion. The diocese elected Nicholas Henderson, a British priest, as its bishop, but other bishops within the Church of the Province of Central Africa objected due to Henderson's leadership in Modern Church, a liberal Christian theological society, and his support for LGBT rights. The province appointed Bishop of Lusaka Jameson Mwenda to fill the role; however, Henderson's supporters in the diocese challenged the appointment of Mwenda in court. In 2006, the Lilongwe High Court ruled that Mwenda was the rightful spiritual authority of the diocese.

In 2014, under Bishop Francis Kaulanda, the diocese founded Lake Malawi Anglican University in Malawi.

The Anglican Council of Malawi approved a plan in 2026 to divide the growing diocese into three. The Diocese of Lake Malawi's territory would include Nkhotakota and Salima districts and the lower part of the Dedza District. The new Diocese of the Central Highlands would cover Kasungu, Dowa and Ntchisi districts. Daniel Kalonga, bishop of Lake Malawi since 2025, would be translated to the new Diocese of Central Malawi, which would encompass Lilongwe, Mchinji the upper Dedza districts. New bishops were set to be elected in 2026 with their installations to take place by the beginning of 2027.

== Bishops ==
No.	Name	Dates	Notes
1	Josiah Mtekateka	1971–1978	Previously suffragan bishop of the Diocese of Malawi
2	Peter Nyanja	1978–2005	
3	Jameson Mwenda	2005–2009	Translated from Lusaka
4	Francis Kaulanda	2010–2024	
5	Daniel Kalonga	Since 2025	

== Companion diocese and partnerships ==
The Diocese of Birmingham in the Church of England
