= Archbishop of Central Africa =

This is a list of the archbishops of the Anglican Church of the Province of Central Africa, which encompasses the present-day Botswana, Malawi, Zambia, and Zimbabwe.

== List of Archbishops of Central Africa ==
Archbishops of Central Africa
From	Until	Incumbent	Notes
1954	1956	Edward Paget, Bishop of Mashonaland	
1956	1961	James Hughes, Bishop of Matabeleland	Translated to Trinidad and Tobago.
1961	1969	Oliver Green-Wilkinson, Bishop of Northern Rhodesia	Died in office.
1969	1980	Donald Arden, Bishop of Southern Malawi	Returned to the United Kingdom.
1980	2001	Walter Khotso Makhulu	Born 1935; also Bishop of Botswana until 1988; now Archbishop emeritus (of Central Africa).
2001	2006	Bernard Malango	Also Bishop of Northern Zambia until 2002; also Bishop of Upper Shire from 2002.
2011	present	Albert Chama, Bishop of Northern Zambia	Installed 20 March 2011
