= Diocese of Manicaland =

The Diocese of Manicaland is one of the five diocese in Zimbabwe within the Church of the Province of Central Africa: the current bishop is Erick Ruwona. The Church of the Province of Central Africa is headed by the Archbishop Albert Chama. Bishop Erick Ruwona is currently the Bishop of Manicaland after being consecrated on 30 May 2015. The diocesan head offices are in Mutare. The Diocese of Manicaland was inaugurated in 1981 with the election of the first Bishop Elijah Masuko. The Dioceses of Manicaland was created on the occasion of the 90th anniversary of the founding of the Anglican Church in Zimbabwe.
