= Ignatius Makumbe =

Zimbabwean Anglican bishop

Ignatius Makumbe is an Anglican bishop in Zimbabwe: he succeeded Bishop Ishmael Mukuwanda as Bishop of Central Zimbabwe in 2018.

Makumbe was a teacher before his ordination in 2000. Before his election he was the incumbent at St Andrew, Gweru. He is married to Florah and they have two children.
