= Josiah Mtekateka =

Malawian Anglican bishop (1903–1996)

The Right Reverend Josiah Mtekateka
- Bishop of Lake Malawi
- Church: Church of the Province of Central Africa
- Diocese: Lake Malawi
- In office: 1971–1978
- Successor: Peter Nyanja
- Previous posts: Suffragan bishop of the Diocese of Malawi, 1965–1971

Orders
- Ordination: 31 January 1939 (diaconate); 24 February 1943 (priesthood) by Frank Thorne
- Consecration: 27 May 1965 by Oliver Green-Wilkinson

Personal details
- Born: 1903 Likoma, Malawi
- Died: 1996 (aged 93) Blantyre, Malawi
- Denomination: Anglican
- Spouse: Maude Nambote
- Children: 13
- Education: St. Michael's College, Blantyre; St. Andrew's College, Likoma

Josiah Mtekateka (1903–1996) was a Malawian Anglican bishop. Born on Likoma Island, as a youth he worked as a servant of missionaries at Universities' Mission to Central Africa (UMCA) headquarters at St Peter's Cathedral. He later trained as a teacher and then as a priest. When he was consecrated as a bishop in 1965, he was the first indigenous Malawian to become a bishop in the Anglican Communion. He initially served as suffragan bishop in the Diocese of Malawi, and in 1971 he became the first diocesan bishop of the newly formed Diocese of Lake Malawi. Mtekateka retired as bishop in 1978.

== Early life and teaching career ==
Mtekateka was born on Likoma, the home base of the UMCA, in 1903. His upbringing was influenced by the presence of Anglican missionaries on Likoma. He attended school beginning at age three and worked as a servant, building helper and "office boy". His school was for theology and the buildings were later re-purposed to create Likoma Secondary School. The missionary teachers were strict and Mtekateka later recalled receiving painful beatings. During his secondary school years in Likoma, his teachers were native Malawians, not European missionaries.

Mtekateka, who loved church music, was confirmed by Bishop Cathrew Fisher at the newly completed St Peter's Cathedral in 1916. After completing the highest level of education offered by the UMCA schools, he was hired as a priest's dog keeper. As a young man, he aspired to be a lay catechist. He attended mass and evensong regularly at the cathedral and was eventually encouraged to consider the priesthood. He later recalled that "he did not think he would not make a good priest" but decided to sit for the entrance exam for a teachers' college. After passing the exam, Mtekateka enrolled in St Michael's College in 1921. In 1925, he married Maude Nambote.

Mtekateka completed his studies with high marks. He initially applied for jobs in Northern Rhodesia, where career prospects appeared better for Malawian teachers. Missionaries at Likoma dissuaded him from going by proposing that he start a new school in southern Nyasaland. During his time in the southern part of the country, he was licensed as a lay reader and eventually left teaching to pursue ordained ministry.

== Ordained ministry ==
Alongside three other indigenous lay readers, Mtekateka began training as a deacon in 1936. He was ordained at St Peter's Cathedral by Bishop Frank Thorne in January 1939. Mtekateka studied for the priesthood at St Andrew's College on Likoma and was ordained in that order in February 1943.

He began his priestly ministry at Chiluli, Tanganyika, an area that became part of the newly formed Diocese of South-West Tanganyika in 1953. While in present-day Tanzania, Mtekateka was named an archdeacon. He travelled to England in 1957 to represent the diocese at the UMCA centennial celebrations.

During the 1960s, Anglican churches in Africa sought to develop indigenous leadership. Pressure to appoint indigenous bishops came both from the Archbishop of Canterbury and from within Malawian churches. On 6 December 1964, Mtekateka was chosen as the first suffragan bishop of the Diocese of Nyasaland. He was on the same day elected suffragan bishop in the Diocese of South-West Tanganyika. He ultimately chose to serve in the Malawian diocese and was consecrated in May 1965 at St Peter's Cathedral. He was the first indigenous Malawian to become a bishop in the Anglican Communion. According to historian Henry Mbaya, Mtekateka's election was driven not by any administrative skills, which were prized in English bishops, but on grounds of strength of personality, charisma and "natural" authority, indicating a new approach to episcopacy compared to the UMCA bishops.

Amid the growth of the Church of the Province of Central Africa, the newly renamed Diocese of Malawi was divided in 1971. Bishop Donald Arden became bishop of Southern Malawi, and Mtekateka was elected unanimously as the first bishop of the Diocese of Lake Malawi, in the northern part of the country.

While the cathedral remained at St Peter's on Likoma, Mtekateka relocated his diocesan headquarters to the mainland city of Nkhotakota, shifting power and influence away from its longtime centre on the island. Both as suffragan and as diocesan bishop, Mtekateka relied on missionary priests from Europe or North America to serve as his chaplain and oversee administrative affairs, an arrangement that Mbaya said led Mtekateka to remain unnecessarily dependent on non-Malawians for his ministry.

== Later life ==
Mtekateka called an election for his successor as bishop in 1976, and Henry Mikaya was elected coadjutor bishop. While Mikaya had Mtekateka's support, canonical charges were raised against Mikaya prior to his consecration. Donald Arden—then archbishop of the province—found two of the charges valid and initiated disciplinary procedures, while Mtekateka pursued reconciliation between Mikaya and his accusers. As the process unfolded, the date of Mtekateka's resignation was reached, and under Arden's leadership the province's episcopal synod determined that a election for a diocesan bishop was needed. This election was held in 1978 and Peter Nyanja was elected, although he was not Mtekateka's choice and Mtekateka was reluctant to preach at Nyanja's consecration.

Mtekateka retired to Ntchisi in central Malawi. He died in Blantyre in 1996 at 93.
