= Robert Mumbi =

Zambian bishop

Robert Mumbi is a Zambian bishop in the Church of the Province of Central Africa; he is Bishop of Luapula, one of five dioceses in Zambia.
