= 1993 Malawian democracy referendum =

Referendum ending one-party rule in Malawi

- 14 June 1993

Results
Choice	Votes	%
One-party system	1,088,473	35.31%
Multi-party system	1,993,996	64.69%
Valid votes	3,082,469	97.75%
Invalid or blank votes	70,979	2.25%
Total votes	3,153,448	100.00%
Registered voters/turnout	4,699,527	67.1%
- Results of the referendum by region (left) and district (right)

A referendum on reintroducing multi-party democracy was held in Malawi on 14 June 1993. It asked voters to decide whether Malawi would remain a single-party state or transition to a multiparty democracy. The country had been governed by the Malawi Congress Party (MCP) since independence in 1964, with Hastings Kamuzu Banda serving as President for Life from 1971.

Banda agreed to hold the referendum in response to international pressure and growing domestic unrest. Opposition groups had initially doubted the legitimacy of the process, but eventually participated once they were allowed to register as “special interest groups” and after a series of discussions led to an agreed legal framework. Major opposition participants included the Catholic and Presbyterian Churches, the United Democratic Front (representing internal opponents and dissident government officials), and the Alliance for Democracy (linked to trade unions and opposition groups in exile).

The referendum campaign faced controversy, including allegations of misuse of state resources by the Banda regime. The opposition claimed limited access to key media outlets, particularly radio, and had to rely on public rallies and clandestine efforts, which remained largely confined to urban areas. Mediated by the United Nations, discussions led to agreements between the government, the Alliance for Democracy (AFORD), and the United Democratic Front (UDF), allowing the referendum to proceed with opposition participation. Although divisions among opposition groups became apparent, AFORD and the UDF pledged to prevent internal disagreements from weakening their broader goal of expanding political pluralism.

The MCP mounted a considerable effort to maintain its status as the country's only legal party, claiming multiparty politics would lead to tribal and religious conflict. Several of Banda's advisers were aggrieved by having to call the referendum, believing it came from pressure from Western donors who were no longer willing to prop up Banda's regime in the aftermath of the end of communism. Despite this, some MCP insiders conceded there was a chance the referendum would pass.

Over 64% of voters voted to end the MCP's 27-year monopoly on power, compared to 35.31% for maintaining a single-party system. Voter turnout reached 67.1% of the registered electorate, with higher participation in the center and north than in the south. International observers recognized the multiparty victory but noted incidents of intimidation against government critics, concluding that the referendum was not entirely free and fair. The results were regionally polarized, with the Malawi Congress Party retaining support in its central strongholds, while opposition forces secured large majorities in the far north and south, exceeding 80% in those areas.

Banda recognized the referendum outcome but rejected calls to resign and allow a transitional government. A National Consultative Council was formed, which removed most of the dictatorial powers Banda had held since the institution of one-party rule in 1966. It also ended his position as president for life, though he remained head of state. The army dismantled the regime’s secret police in December, paving the way for general elections the following year.

General elections were held in 1994, in which Banda and the MCP were soundly defeated. Voter turnout for the referendum was 67% of the 4.7 million registered voters.

== Historical Context ==
Malawi gained independence in 1964 under the leadership of Hastings Kamuzu Banda and the Malawi Congress Party (MCP). In 1966, the MCP was declared the only legal party, initiating a period often characterized as a “one-man state” led by a “highly repressive autocracy.” Under Banda’s rule, strict controls were imposed on social, political, and moral behavior. All adult Malawians were required to join the MCP and carry party identification, with severe penalties for dissent.

Banda’s regime maintained full diplomatic relations with apartheid South Africa—at the time the only African country to do so—and received support from the United States, which viewed Malawi as a strategic anti-communist ally. Although Malawi’s economy was considered relatively stable compared to others in the region, the pervasive reach of Banda’s government fostered a climate of fear. The Young Pioneers of Malawi, operating as a paramilitary and secret police force, held more influence than the national army and were largely responsible for suppressing opposition through intimidation.

=== Shift in International and Domestic Pressures ===
By the late 1980s, the end of the Cold War and the decline of apartheid in South Africa reduced Western support for Banda’s government, and international pressure for political reforms increased. Malawi’s economic situation deteriorated, and the regime lost much of its external backing. Banda’s declining health—he was nearly ninety years old—enabled his close associates, John Tembo and Cecilia Kadzamira, to assume many governing responsibilities and limit his day-to-day involvement. As Banda’s personal control waned, internal dissent grew, and the regime’s repressive apparatus became increasingly ineffective in containing opposition sentiment.

By the end of 1991, Malawi was the only country in southern Africa to retain a one-party system, with nearby nations such as Zambia, Tanzania, and Mozambique adopting multiparty structures. This regional shift emboldened segments of Malawi’s population to demand change. On 8 March 1992, Malawi’s Catholic bishops issued a pastoral letter criticizing human rights violations, sparking open criticism of the regime. Later that month, more than eighty Malawian opposition activists in exile met in Lusaka, Zambia, to coordinate strategies for democratic reforms in Malawi.

In April 1992, exiled union leader Chakufwa Chihana returned to Malawi and delivered a speech at Lilongwe International Airport, referring to the MCP as “a party of death and darkness” and calling for a national referendum. He was arrested immediately and sentenced to two years in prison with hard labor on charges of sedition. His arrest attracted international condemnation and fueled ongoing protests in Lilongwe and Blantyre, culminating in large-scale riots. Security forces used lethal force to disperse protesters, resulting in 38 fatalities. These events marked the most significant expression of public discontent against the MCP regime in three decades. In response, several international donors suspended non-humanitarian aid, isolating Malawi further.

In the face of growing dissent, the regime dissolved the National Assembly and called for one-party elections in June to fill the 141 legislative seats. Opposition groups, organized under a “Committee for a Democratic Alliance,” called for a boycott. According to official figures, 45 candidates were returned unopposed, and five seats remained vacant due to disqualifications. In constituencies where voting took place, 62 incumbent legislators lost their seats. The regime announced an 80% voter turnout, but independent estimates suggested that fewer than 40% of eligible voters participated overall. In Blantyre, turnout was reported at 20%, and in certain areas only 10%.

=== Referendum Proposal ===
Following the government’s refusal to allow political reforms and the contested legislative election, tensions continued to rise. In August, the Livingstonia Synod of the Central African Presbyterian Church (CCAP) formed a committee to urge the government to hold the referendum proposed by Chakufwa Chihana. The Christian Council of Malawi (CCM), which represents seventeen Protestant churches, supported this initiative.

Pro-democracy committees were established in the country’s three main regions to bolster opposition efforts and contest government claims of a lack of organized dissent. In September, the faction associated with Chihana announced the creation of the Alliance for Democracy (AFORD), described as the first major opposition organization formed in Malawi since independence.

Under increased pressure and concerned about renewed unrest, the government agreed to create a “Presidential Dialogue Committee” (PCD) to address “issues of national interest” with opposition representatives and religious leaders. On 18 October, President Hastings Kamuzu Banda unexpectedly announced a referendum to determine whether Malawi would continue under a single-party system or hold multiparty elections, surprising many citizens and opposition groups.

=== Formation of Additional Opposition Groups ===
After the referendum was announced, a group of former civil servants and politicians who had been dismissed or sidelined under the single-party regime founded the United Democratic Front (UDF), led by Bakili Muluzi, a former Secretary General of the Malawi Congress Party (MCP). The UDF mobilized support within Malawi in favor of a multiparty system. Although the UDF and the Alliance for Democracy (AFORD) shared similar goals, the UDF was hesitant to include exiled leaders. AFORD contended that exiled opposition figures should be permitted to return and participate in the political process. Despite these differences, tensions between the two groups remained low given the political environment created by the referendum.

Opposition organizations, including emerging political parties, religious institutions, and civil society representatives, formed the Public Affairs Committee (PAC). The PAC met with the government’s Presidential Dialogue Committee to negotiate conditions for the upcoming referendum, marking the first instance since independence in which government representatives conferred with opposition figures on national issues.

== Organisation ==
=== United Nations Involvement ===
The Malawian government sought technical assistance from the United Nations to secure international support for the financing, organization, and monitoring of the referendum. In November 1992, a team of five technical experts—among them Keith Klein, Director of Africa and Near East Programs at the International Foundation for Electoral Systems (IFES), and Horacio Boneo, Director of the UN Electoral Assistance Unit—conducted a preliminary evaluation of Malawi’s capacity to organize a credible process. The team recommended establishing an independent commission to oversee the referendum, ensuring the presence of organized and competitive groups representing both options, upholding freedoms of opinion and expression, creating a clear voter registration process, adopting a single ballot box system, and providing adequate security and international observation.

On 31 December 1992, President Hastings Kamuzu Banda announced 15 March 1993 as the referendum date. However, the UN team advised postponing it to allow opposition groups sufficient time to prepare their campaigns. On 5 February 1993, the government agreed to reschedule the vote for 14 June of that year.

=== Legal Framework and Referendum Commission ===
On 5 February 1993, President Hastings Kamuzu Banda issued a decree establishing the Referendum Commission and promulgated the “Referendum Regulations” to govern the upcoming vote. These regulations stipulated that Malawian citizens aged 21 or older, with no legal impediments, were entitled to register and cast a ballot. Voter registration took place from 3 April to 8 May 1993, followed by an official campaign period ending on 12 June, two days before the referendum.

Because Malawi remained a single-party state at the time, opposition groups had no formal legal status. However, they were permitted to operate during the campaign under the “special interest group” designation. This provision enabled organizations such as the United Democratic Front (UDF), the Alliance for Democracy (AFORD), the Public Affairs Committee (PAC), and the Christian Council of Malawi (CCM) to register and campaign on an equal footing.

=== Ballot Box Controversy ===
Despite the United Nations team's recommendation to adopt a single-ballot-box system, the initial regulations provided for two separate boxes—one for the single-party option and another for the multiparty option.^{[6]} Opposition groups criticized this arrangement, arguing that it compromised voting secrecy. By May 1993, shortly before the referendum, disputes persisted between the government and opposition organizations over the ballot box format.

The Public Affairs Committee declared that it would boycott the vote if its demand for a single ballot box was not met by 8 May, but no boycott was announced on that date. On 10 May, a UN special envoy arrived in Malawi to mediate, and the Public Affairs Committee agreed to extend its deadline. Negotiations concluded on 17 May, when the government agreed to use a single ballot box and a single voting booth, issuing two ballots to each voter—one indicating support for a single-party system and another for a multiparty system. This agreement allowed the referendum campaign to proceed with political and educational activities on both sides.

=== Special Interest Groups ===
Under the Referendum Regulations, four organizations registered as “special interest groups” to participate in the campaign.

Position	Groups
Multiparty	United Democratic Front (Malawi) (UDF)
Multiparty	Alliance for Democracy (AFORD)
Multiparty	Public Affairs Committee (PAC)
Unipartisanship	Malawi Congress Party (MCP)

=== International Observation ===
The Referendum Regulations included provisions for international observation, aligning with prior agreements reached between opposition groups and the government, as well as recommendations from the United Nations technical team. Under these regulations, the Referendum Commission could invite observers at its own discretion or upon request by the president, registered interest groups, governments, and other relevant entities. Malawian citizens were not eligible to serve as international observers. Multiple international institutions, in addition to the United Nations, dispatched observer missions to oversee the referendum process.

== Campaign Period ==
The official referendum campaign ran from mid-May to 12 June, though both supporters and opponents of the one-party system had begun organizing earlier. Once “special interest groups” were permitted greater freedom of movement, public support for the Malawi Congress Party (MCP)—often referred to as the “CCM” in historical sources—visibly declined. The one-party system had previously been reinforced by legislation allowing detention without charge, strict censorship, traditional courts that limited legal representation, and social incentives for citizens who reported opposition activities.

From April 1993, authorities gradually tolerated increasing levels of public dissent, eventually permitting campaign rallies in populous areas. These rallies signaled a significant setback for the MCP government. Attendance at single-party rallies was typically under 1,000, rarely exceeding 5,000, while United Democratic Front (UDF) and Alliance for Democracy (AFORD) gatherings often drew 10,000 to 20,000 people. The ability of interest groups to hold large rallies further established them as viable political entities, foreshadowing their subsequent transition into recognized political parties after the referendum.

=== Campaign Irregularities ===
Although repressive laws were eased and opposition groups were granted increased freedom of movement, the referendum campaign was marked by significant imbalances. Under the Referendum Regulations, radio advertising was prohibited, which negatively affected multiparty advocates in a country where an estimated 41.7% of the population was literate. With limited access to mass media, opposition organizations relied on direct campaigning and, in many instances, encountered coercion, intimidation, and sabotage by pro-government elements.

In urban areas, a limited number of independent newspapers emerged and facilitated wider distribution of multiparty perspectives. However, the majority of Malawians resided in rural communities, limiting the reach of print media and constraining the opposition’s ability to engage potential voters.

=== Government Rhetoric and Opposition Challenges ===
Government discourse during the campaign emphasized its longstanding monopoly on power, pointing to Malawi’s previous economic and political stability under Hastings Kamuzu Banda’s rule. Officials also employed fear-based messaging, suggesting that abandoning the one-party system would lead to tribal conflict and asserting that Malawi was not prepared for democracy. At a rally in Banda’s hometown of Blantyre, a children’s choir chanted, “Ladies and gentlemen, do not listen to multipartyism, because that is death, that is war.” Several party officials expressed frustration over having to hold the referendum, attributing the move to pressure from Western donors who ended support for the regime following the Cold War. Nevertheless, some Malawi Congress Party (MCP) members acknowledged that the multiparty option might win.

Observers indicated that many voters perceived the referendum primarily as a choice for or against Banda and the MCP, rather than a vote on a political system. A severe drought during the campaign allowed the government to distribute public aid in rural areas under the guise of gifts, prompting accusations of electoral clientelism from the opposition. External observers determined that MCP support had eroded significantly in urban areas and in northern rural regions. As political liberalization progressed and the public felt freer to express discontent, rural backing for the MCP diminished, and the party’s network of informants proved insufficient to maintain an impression of electoral strength.

By the final stages of the campaign, reports suggested that a large portion of the population had gained a clearer understanding of the referendum’s implications and had become familiar with the symbols representing each option. An “elevated” civic atmosphere was noted, with heightened engagement and awareness across the electorate.

== Results ==
=== Overall Results ===
Choice	Votes	%
Multi-party state	1,993,996	64.69
One-party state	1,088,473	35.31
Total	3,082,469	100.00
Valid votes	3,082,469	97.75
Invalid/blank votes	70,979	2.25
Total votes	3,153,448	100.00
Registered voters/turnout	4,699,527	67.10
Source: African Elections Database

=== Result by District ===
District	Multiparty		Unipartisanship		Valid Votes	White/Null	Total/Registered		
District	Votes	%	Votes	%	Valid Votes	White/Null	Total/Registered		
Dedza	34,628	25.56%	100,840	74.44%	135,468	3,972	139,440	75.5%	184,589
Dowa	20,345	14.93%	115,958	85.07%	136,303	3,429	139,732	72.0%	194,010
Kasungu	48,960	28.05%	125,600	71.95%	174,560	4,982	179,542	77.3%	232,276
Lilongwe	105,110	28.23%	267,168	71.77%	372,278	12,512	384,790	65.1%	591,460
Mchinji	34,559	31.54%	75,012	68.46%	109,571	6,854	116,425	59.3%	196,393
Nkhotakota	35,965	47.03%	40,515	52.97%	76,480	2,856	79,336	59.3%	133,866
Ntcheu	74,655	74.74%	25,227	25.26%	99,882	1,089	100,971	70.8%	142,550
Ntchisi	11,224	21.93%	39,946	78.07%	51,170	883	52,053	81.1%	64,204
Salima	34,586	45.07%	42,147	54.93%	76,733	1,859	78,592	83.2%	94,472
Central	400,032	32.46%	832,413	67.54%	1,232,445	38,436	1,270,881	69.3%	1,833,820
Chitipa	37,165	91.16%	3,603	8.84%	40,768	305	41,073	70.3%	58,404
Karonga	61,038	94.14%	3,799	5.86%	64,837	539	65,376	59.1%	110,603
Nkhata Bay	54,990	92.59%	4,399	7.41%	59,389	822	60,211	46.5%	129,514
Rumphi	43,943	86.79%	6,687	13.21%	50,630	712	51,342	86.6%	59,300
Mzuzu	73,281	80.71%	17,520	19.29%	90,801	1,031	91,832	82.8%	110,980
Mzimba	122,152	91.67%	11,093	8.33%	133,245	1,117	134,362	83.7%	160,538
North	392,569	89.29%	47,101	10.71%	439,670	4,526	444,196	70.6%	629,339
Blantyre	197,938	86.70%	30,363	13.30%	228,301	2,107	230,408	85.0%	271,152
Chikwawa	80,364	76.54%	24,631	23.46%	104,995	1,878	106,873	54.8%	194,987
Chiradzulu	70,578	89.21%	8,539	10.79%	79,117	3,455	82,572	83.7%	98,605
Machinga	181,186	91.31%	17,240	8.69%	198,426	2,813	201,239	58.4%	344,753
Mangochi	179,697	90.94%	17,911	9.06%	197,608	3,711	201,319	57.2%	352,263
Mulanje	145,111	79.35%	37,775	20.65%	182,886	8,480	191,366	55.2%	347,006
Mwanza	29,137	71.46%	11,639	28.54%	40,776	749	41,525	55.5%	74,890
Nsanje	47,929	82.59%	10,106	17.41%	58,035	818	58,853	55.4%	106,287
Thyolo	122,823	81.30%	28,259	18.70%	151,082	2,403	153,485	82.4%	186,262
Zomba	146,632	86.70%	22,496	13.30%	169,128	1,603	170,731	65.6%	260,163
South	1,201,395	85.18%	208,959	14.82%	1,410,354	28,017	1,438,371	64.3%	2,236,368
Total	1,993,996	64.69%	1,088,473	35.31%	3,082,469	70,979	3,153,448	67.1%	4,699,527
Fuente: African Elections Database

== See also ==
- Political history of Malawi
