= Political history of Malawi =

History of Malawi

Flag of Nyasaland (1925–1964)

The political history of Malawi spans over a century. Malawi, then Nyasaland, effectively became a one-party state in August 1961, when the country held its first general elections, and the Malawi Congress Party (MCP) led by Hastings Kamuzu Banda became the dominant force. This status was formalized in 1966 when the constitution declared the MCP the sole legitimate political party. However, in 1993, the constitution was amended to introduce a multiparty system, paving the way for the emergence of new political parties. The United Democratic Front (UDF) quickly rose to prominence, and since then, other parties have also gained ground. The constitution guarantees all citizens aged 18 and above the right to participate in the political process, including the right to run for public office. Women and minority groups have made significant strides in Malawian politics, holding various positions in the National Assembly, cabinet, and judiciary, and contributing to the country's political landscape.

== History ==
=== Early years (1890s-1964) ===
==== British colonial rule ====
Malawi was a British colony, known as Nyasaland, from 1891 to 1964. The colonial era saw the exploitation of Malawi's natural resources and the suppression of local cultures and traditions. The British exploited Malawi's natural resources, including tobacco, tea, and sugar, and imposed their own language, culture, and political systems.

==== Resistance and nationalism ====
Malawians resisted colonial rule, with various uprisings and protests. The Malawi Congress Party (MCP) was formed in 1959, led by Dr. Hastings Kamuzu Banda, to fight for independence.

Occurrences in Nyasaland
Flag of Nyasaland (1925–1964)

The current flag of Malawi, the then Nyasaland, after independence

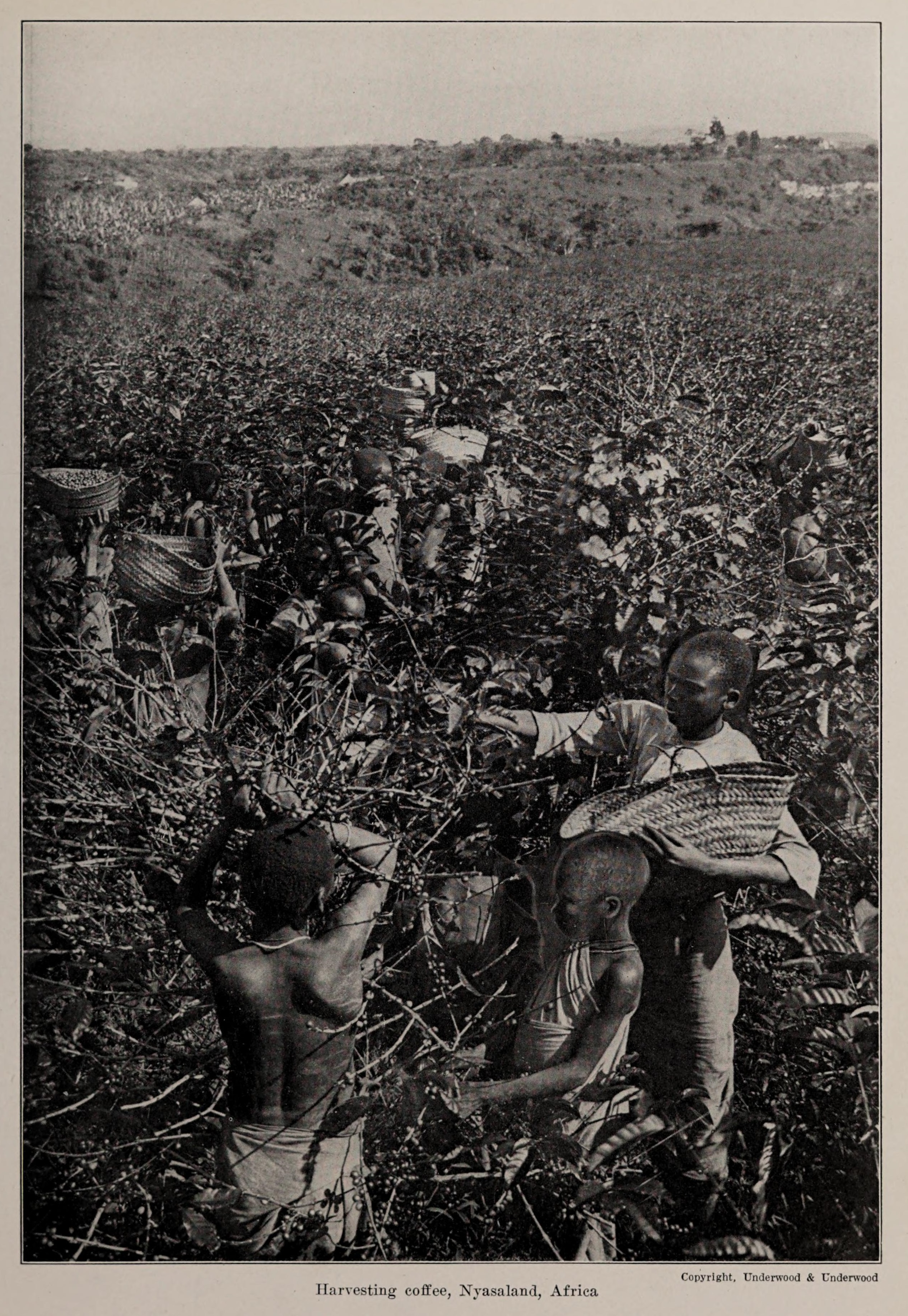
Harvesting coffee in Nyasaland

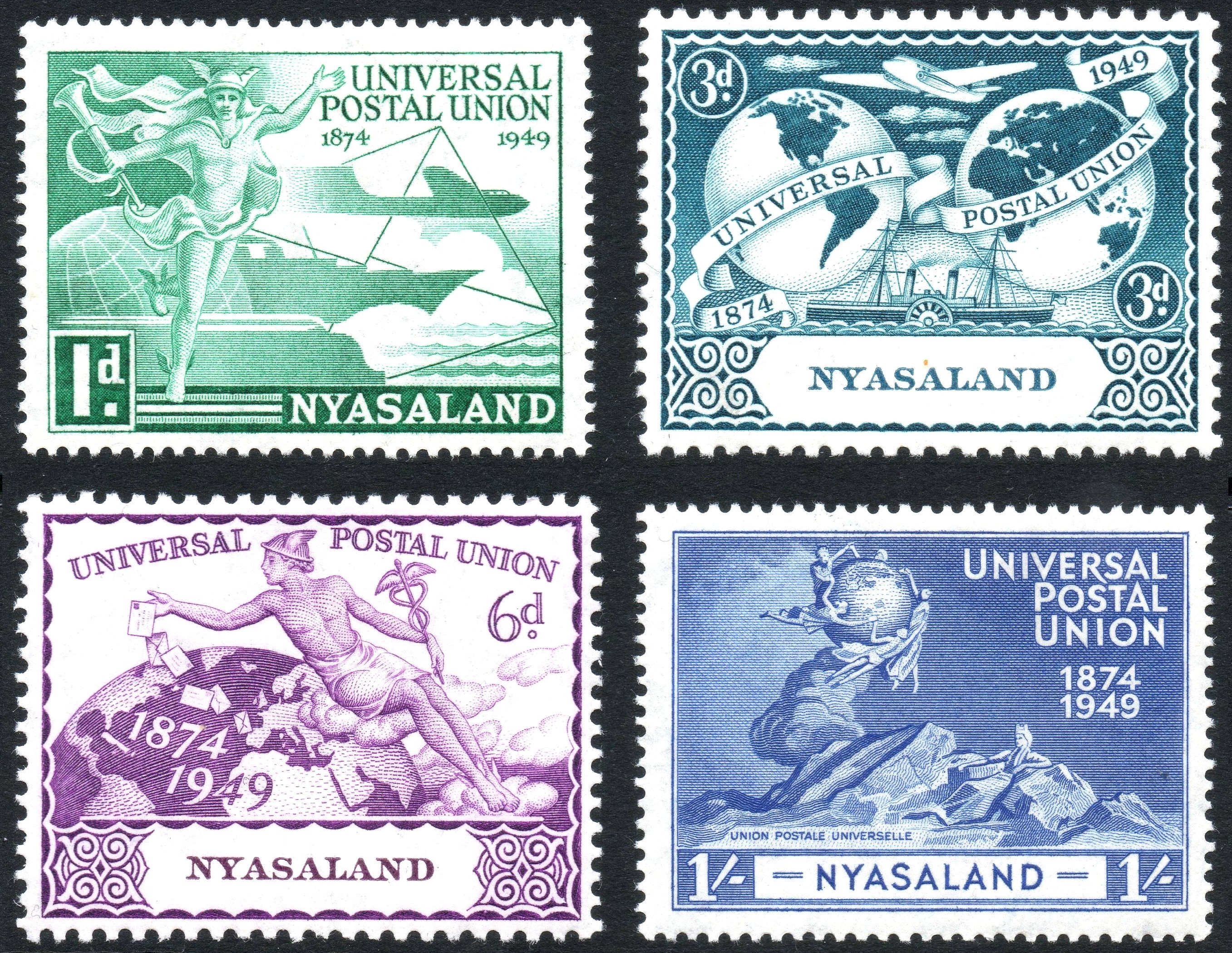
Nyasaland stamps in 1949

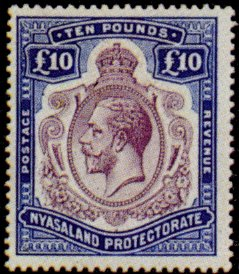
Stamp of Nyasaland 1913

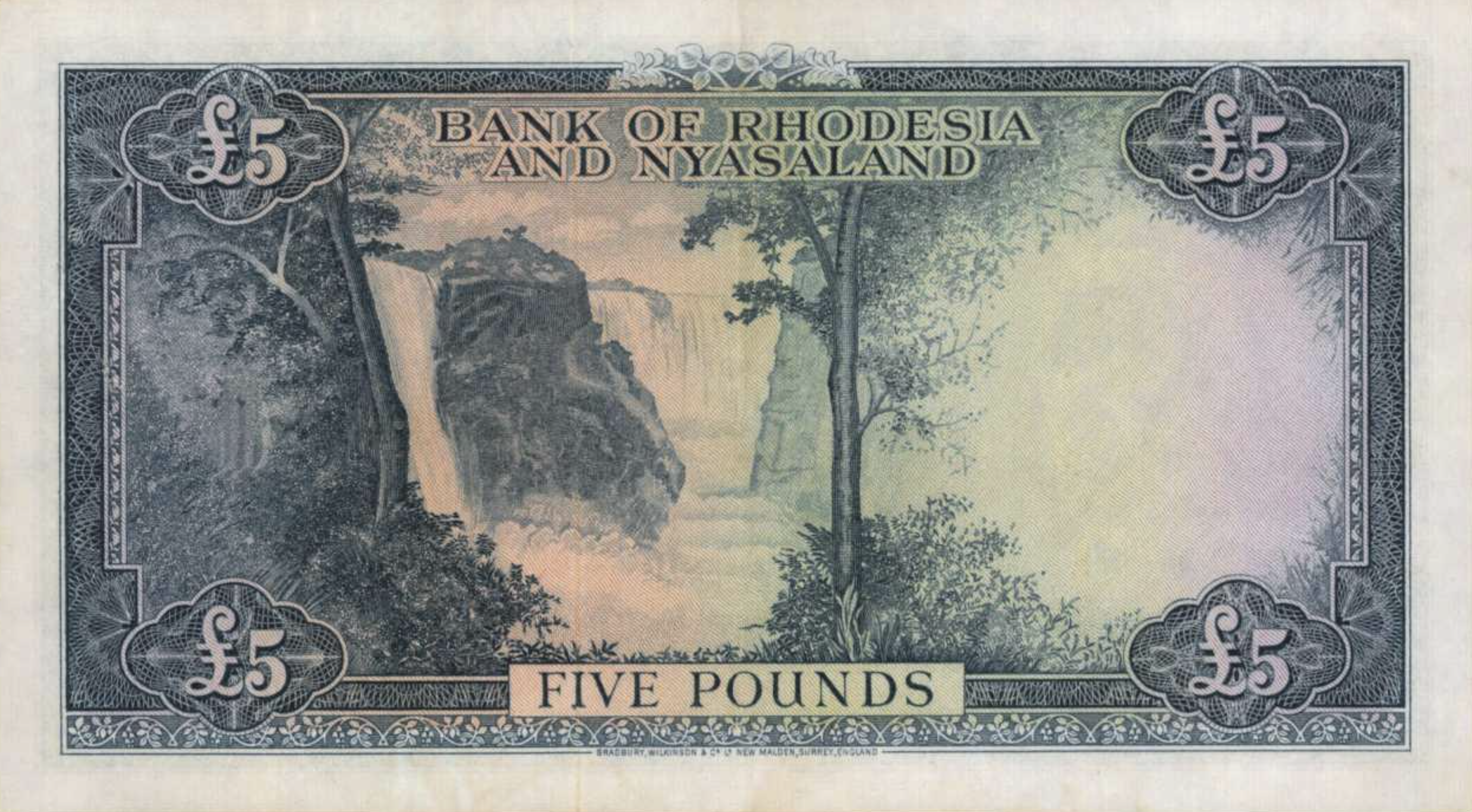
The Rhodesia & Nyasaland £5 note, printed in 1957.

== Independence era (1964-1994) ==
=== Independence ===
The Malawi Congress Party (MCP) was formed in 1959, led by Dr. Hastings Kamuzu Banda, to fight for independence. Malawi gained independence on July 6, 1964, with Dr. Banda as its first president.

=== One-party state ===
In 1971, Banda declared Malawi a one-party state, making the MCP the only legal party. Opposition was suppressed, and dissent was not tolerated. The MCP became the dominant party, and Banda ruled with an iron fist, suppressing opposition and dissent.

==== Human rights abuses ====
Banda's regime was notorious for human rights abuses, including forced labor, political imprisonment, and torture.

== Multiparty era (1994-2019) ==
=== Democratic reforms ===
In 1993, Malawi adopted a new constitution, allowing for multiparty democracy.

==== First multiparty elections ====
The 1994 elections saw the United Democratic Front (UDF), led by Bakili Muluzi, win a majority. The United Democratic Front (UDF), led by Bakili Muluzi, won the 1994 elections, ending the MCP's dominance.

==== Political instability ====
The 1990s and 2000s saw frequent changes in government, with allegations of corruption and political interference. Muluzi served two terms, followed by Bingu wa Mutharika (DPP) and Joyce Banda (People's Party).

==== Economic struggles ====
Malawi faced significant economic challenges, including poverty, inflation, and dependence on foreign aid.

== Current era (2019-present) ==
in 2019, allegations were made by an opposition party towards the ruling party of Democratic Progressive Party led by Peter Mutharika. Mutharika was defeated by the Tonse Alliance which was led by Dr Lazarus Chakwera as its President and Dr Saulos Chilima as the Vice President.
