= Malawi Roads Authority =

Quasi government body in Malawi

The Malawi Roads Authority (MRA) is a Malawian quasi government body established in early 2006 by an Act of Parliament of Malawi with intention to ensure that public roads are maintained, as well as rehabilitated at all times. The body is responsible for development, maintenance and management of the Malawi road network infrastructure.

On the lowest level, the network ends with trucks and trails where as the main is made up of Main Roads, Tertiary Roads and Secondary Roads.
