= Diocese of Masvingo (Anglican) =

Fifth Diocese (Province Of Central Africa)

The Anglican Diocese of Masvingo is the fifth and newest diocese in Zimbabwe within the Church of the Province of Central Africa. The current bishop is Osiward Mapika who replaced the retired bishop, Godfrey Taonezvi, in 2022.
