= Walter Khotso Makhulu =

South African Anglican archbishop of Central Africa (born 1935)

The Most Reverend Walter Khotso Makhulu CMG COT
- Archbishop of Central Africa
- Church: Church of the Province of Central Africa
- Diocese: Botswana
- In office: 1980–2001
- Predecessor: Donald Arden
- Successor: Bernard Malango
- Previous post: Bishop of Botswana (1979–2000)

Orders
- Ordination: 1957 (diaconate); 1958 (priesthood) by Bernard Malango

Personal details
- Born: 1935 (age 90–91) Johannesburg, South Africa
- Denomination: Anglicanism
- Education: St Peter's Theological College; Selly Oak College

Walter Paul Khotso Makhulu (born 1935 in Johannesburg) is a South African-born Anglican bishop. He was archbishop of Central Africa from 1980 to 2001.

Makhulu was educated at St Peter's Theological College, Rosettenville and Selly Oak College, Birmingham. He was ordained deacon in 1957 and priest in 1958. He was a curate at St. Michael and All Angels church, Poplar, London from 1964 until 1966; and at St Silas, Pentonville from 1966 until 1968. He was vicar of St Philip's, Battersea from 1968 to 1975; and then secretary of WCC (East Africa) until his ordination to the episcopate.

Makhulu was patron of Ditshwanelo, the Botswana Centre for Human Rights. When it campaigned for LGBT rights in Botswana, some religious leaders were critical, but he commented "Yes the Bible does say it is opposed [to homosexuality]. But it was written in its own day and in its own time".

== Honours ==
In 1981, Makhulu was a recipient of the Ordre des Palmes académiques. He was admitted to the Order of the Companions of O. R. Tambo by the president of South Africa, Cyril Ramaphosa on 25 April 2019. He was an honorary assistant bishop of the Diocese of London until his resignation in March 2023.

== Notes ==
Anglican Communion titles
Preceded by C. Shannon Mallory	Bishop of Botswana; 1979–2000	Succeeded by Theo Naledi
Preceded by Donald Arden	Archbishop of Central Africa; 1980–2001	Succeeded by Bernard Malango
