= Diocese of Northern Zambia =

The Diocese of Northern Zambia is one of five dioceses in Zambia within the Church of the Province of Central Africa: it was created in 1971. The first bishop was Joseph Mabula and the current bishop is Albert Chama.
