= Joseph Mabula =

Joseph Mabula was the inaugural Anglican Bishop of Central Zambia.

Mubula trained for the Priesthood at St John's Seminary, Lusaka and was ordained in 1967. After service as a priest in Northern Zambia he was appointed its first bishop in 1971.
