= Five Talents =

Charity

Five Talents is a Christian charity that provides savings programs, and financial literacy and business training for those in need in developing countries. They make use of a form of savings-led microfinance. Five Talents' programs serve people regardless of religious background, and they aim to transform lives through economic empowerment, creating long-term solutions to poverty in the developing world.

The organization’s name was inspired by the Parable of the talents or minas from the Bible. The parable illustrates that every human being has dignity and God-given resources that can be used for good. By providing access to financial services and business training, Five Talents empowers the poor to develop and use their resources and talents.

In May 2010 Five Talents was featured on the BBC's monthly television charity appeal program 'Lifeline'. A short film starring Sandi Toksvig was broadcast on BBC1 and explored the impact of Five Talents on the poor in Tanzania.

== Organization ==
Five Talents has offices in Washington, DC, London, and Kenya with partner organizations in nine countries. It was founded at the Lambeth Conference of Anglican Church leaders in 1998 as 'a long term response to help the poor in developing countries based on need not creed'.

The patron is the Archbishop of Canterbury, currently Sarah Mullally. Five Talents works alongside churches to help communities develop savings groups, offer financial services, and provide financial literacy and business skills training. Five Talents has partnered with local communities to build community banks and has trained over 200,000 entrepreneurs and helped to develop over 80,000 businesses in 21 developing countries around the world.

Five Talents works in nine developing countries: Burundi, Bolivia, Democratic Republic of Congo, Indonesia, Kenya, Myanmar, South Sudan, Tanzania, and Uganda.

== Awards ==
Five Talents US was named "one of the best" non-profits for by Greater Washington's Catalogue for Philanthropy, According to the Catalogue, "115 reviewers from foundations, corporations, corporate giving programs, giving circles, the philanthropic advisory community, and peer nonprofits, evaluate applicants for distinction, merit, and impact."

Five Talents UK won the 2011 Award from Advocates for International Development (A4ID) for the best Development Partner. This award celebrates the outstanding achievements of legal professionals and the development organisations they have worked with in tackling extreme poverty and meeting the UN’s Millennium Development Goals.

== Group lending model ==
Five Talents operates using a training and savings led group lending model. Members receive training in financial literacy, savings, and business development. They meet on a regular basis, often weekly, and contribute to savings groups. After six months of savings, members can access low interest loans provided to the group as a whole, so if one person has difficulty in repaying, the others in the group will have to cover their repayments. This system aims to reach those who are unable to take out commercial loans due to lack of collateral. The majority of borrowers are women. Loans are paid back within a short period of time and recycled for further business development.

== See also ==
- Five Talents
- Parable of the Talents
