= Diocese of Central Zimbabwe =

The Diocese of Central Zimbabwe is one of 15 dioceses within the Anglican Church of the Province of Central Africa. It was inaugurated in 1971 and the current bishop is the Right Reverend Ignatius Makumbe. The Cathedral at Shurugwi Road, Gweru is named for St. Cuthbert; its dean is the Very Revd E. Basvi .
