= Msoro =

Town in Malambo, Zambia

Coordinates: 13°35′S 31°54′E

Msoro is a town in the constituency of Malambo in the Eastern Province of Zambia.
