= Diocese of Eastern Zambia =

The Diocese of Eastern Zambia is one of five Anglican dioceses in Zambia within the Church of the Province of Central Africa: the current bishop is Dennis Milanzi.
