= Albert Chama =

Zambian Anglican bishop

The Most Reverend Albert Chama
- Archbishop of Central Africa
- Church: Church of the Province of Central Africa
- Predecessor: Bernard Malango

Orders
- Consecration: 2003 by Bernard Malango

Albert Chama is a Zambian Anglican bishop. He is the Archbishop and Primate of the Church of the Province of Central Africa, since 2011. He is married and has four children. Now Bishop of the Anglican Diocese of Lusaka after resigning as Bishop of Northern Zambia, according to Anglican Cathedral of the Holy Cross (ACHC) member Derrick Sinjela, a Photo Journalist, and Executive President of the Rainbow Newspaper Limited (RNZL) and Kwilanzi Newspaper Zambia (KNZ).

== Early life and ecclesiastical career ==
He was born in Northern Rhodesia and studied at the University of Zimbabwe. He worked in the ceramics industry before he decided to study for the ministry at Bishop Gaul Theological College, in Harare, Zimbabwe. He moved to England, where he studied at the University of Birmingham, where he received a M.A. degree in Community Management.

He served as a parish priest and university chaplain, before his election and consecration as Bishop of the Diocese of Northern Zambia, in January 2003. He was elected Dean and acting Archbishop of the Province, after Bernard Malango left office in 2006. Vacancies in several dioceses of Malawi and Zimbabwe prevented a quorum of bishops capable to elect a new archbishop for five years. Chama was elected to the vacant title of Archbishop of Central Africa by the House of Bishops, on February 17, 2011, in Harare. He was enthroned at the Cathedral of the Holy Cross, in Lusaka, Zambia, on 20 March 2011.

Chama is a moderate theological conservative. He attended the Global South Fourth Encounter, in Singapore, at 19–23 April 2010, but generally speaking he has been more a supporter of "reconciliation" between the different parts of the Anglican Communion, divided over theological and sexuality issues.

== Notes ==
Anglican Communion titles
Preceded by Bernard Malango	Archbishop of Central Africa; 2011-	Incumbent
