= Diocese of Lusaka =

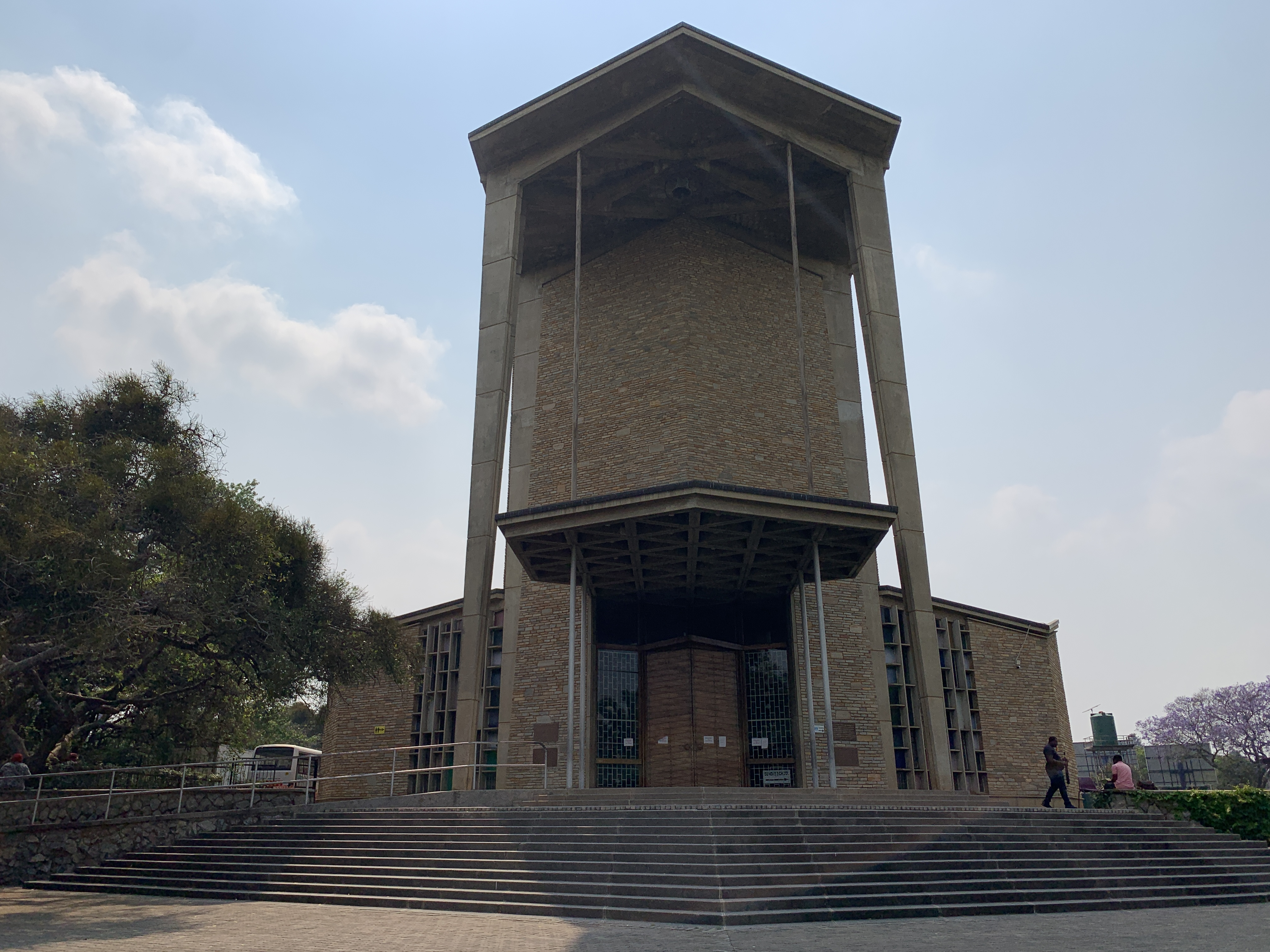
Cathedral of the Holy Cross, Lusaka

The Diocese of Lusaka is one of fifteen Anglican bishoprics within the Church of the Province of Central Africa, covering part of Zambia. It was inaugurated as the Diocese of Northern Rhodesia (the colonial precursor of Zambia) in 1910 and changed its name in 1971. Its seat is the Cathedral of the Holy Cross, Lusaka.

The first bishop of the new diocese was Filemon Mataka. The current bishop is David Njovu.
