= Church of the Province of Central Africa =

Part of the Anglican Communion

The Church of the Province of Central Africa
- Classification: Protestant
- Orientation: Anglican
- Scripture: Holy Bible
- Theology: Anglican doctrine
- Polity: Episcopal
- Primate: Albert Chama
- Headquarters: Mzuzu
- Territory: Botswana, Malawi, Zambia and Zimbabwe
- Members: 1,788,000 (2020)
- Official website: www.anglicancommunion.org

The Church of the Province of Central Africa is part of the Anglican Communion. It includes 15 dioceses in Botswana, Malawi, Zambia and Zimbabwe. The Primate of the Church is the Archbishop of Central Africa. Albert Chama is the current archbishop, being installed on 20 March 2011, succeeding Bernard Amos Malango who retired in 2007. From 1980 to 2000, Walter Khotso Makhulu, an Anti-Apartheid activist, was Archbishop as well as Bishop of Botswana. Archbishop Chama continues to serve as Bishop of Northern Zambia, and is the second Zambian to be Archbishop of Central Africa. In 2020, the World Christian Database and the World Christian Encyclopedia, published by Edinburgh University Press, estimated the church had 1,788,000 baptised members.

== History ==
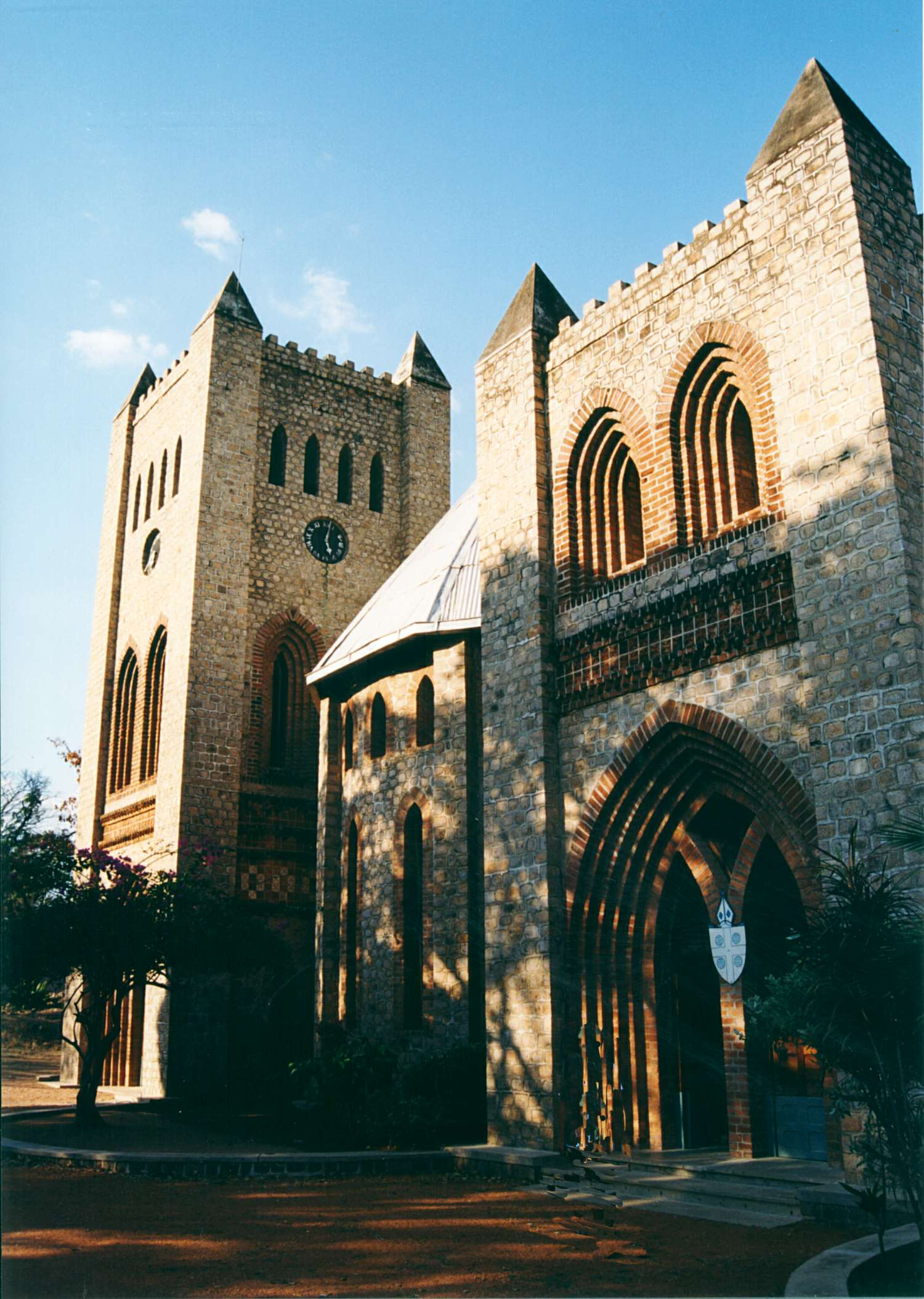
The Cathedral Church of Saint Peter in Likoma, Malawi

In 1861, the first Anglican missionary to the area was Charles Mackenzie, who arrived with David Livingstone. In 1855, Mackenzie had gone with Bishop Colenso to Natal where they worked among the English settlers until 1859. In 1860, Mackenzie became head of the Universities' Mission to Central Africa; he was consecrated bishop in St George's Cathedral, Cape Town, on 1 January 1861. Following David Livingstone's request to Cambridge, Mackenzie took on the position of being the first missionary bishop in Malawi (Nyasaland).

Moving from Cape Town, he arrived at Chibisa's village in June 1861 with the goal to establish a mission station at Magomero, near Zomba. Bishop Mackenzie worked among the people of the Manganja country until January 1862 when he went on a supplies trip together with a few members of his party. The boat they were travelling on, sank and, as medical supplies were lost, Bishop Mackenzie's malaria could not be treated. He died of Blackwater fever on 31 January 1862.

There is an international school named after Mackenzie, which teaches children from 4 to 17 and is in Lilongwe the capital of Malawi. The independent Church of the Province of Central Africa was inaugurated in 1955 and has a movable primacy. The inauguration service was on 8 May 1955; Geoffrey Fisher, Archbishop of Canterbury relinquished his jurisdiction over Northern Rhodesia and Nyasaland and Geoffrey Clayton, Archbishop of Cape Town relinquished his over Mashonaland and Matabeleland.

In 2024, the church approved a plan to divide into three provinces (one each for Zambia, Zimbabwe and Malawi), each of which would be an autonomous church within the Anglican Communion. As part of the plan, the Diocese of Botswana pursued admission to the neighboring Anglican Church of Southern Africa. In 2025, the Diocese of Botswana ordained the first women as transitional deacons, meaning they would later be ordained as priests. In 2026, the Diocese of Botswana ordained its first women as priests; as such, they were also the first female priests ordained in the Church of the Province of Central Africa. The women were ordained on the same day, and the first of them to be ordained was Revd Beauty Autlwetse.

== Membership ==
Today, there are at least 600,000 members of the Church of the Province of Central Africa.

== Structure ==
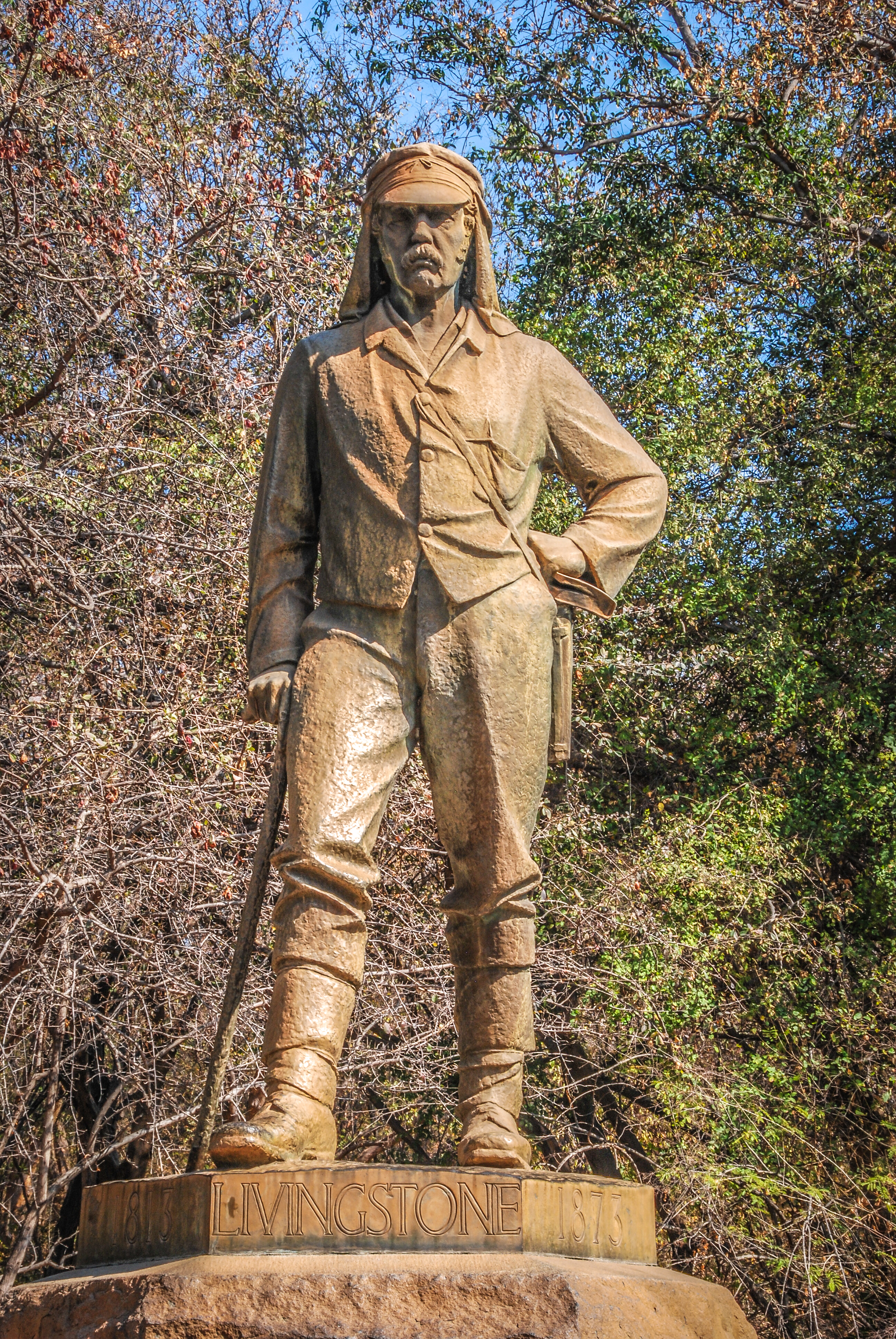
David Livingstone memorial at Victoria Falls. Livingstone requested the first missionary bishop for the Church.

The polity of the Church of the Province of Central Africa is Episcopalian church governance, which is the same as other Anglican churches. The church maintains a system of geographical parishes organized into dioceses. There are 15 of these, each headed by a bishop. The Primate and Metropolitan is the Archbishop of Central Africa.

- Diocese of Botswana
- in Zambia :
  - Diocese of Central Zambia
  - Diocese of Eastern Zambia
  - Diocese of Lusaka
  - Diocese of Luapula
  - Diocese of Northern Zambia
- in Zimbabwe :
  - Diocese of Central Zimbabwe
  - Diocese of Harare
  - Diocese of Masvingo
  - Diocese of Matabeleland
  - Diocese of Manicaland
- in Malawi (former Nyasaland) :
  - Diocese of Lake Malawi
  - Diocese of Northern Malawi
  - Diocese of Southern Malawi
  - Diocese of Upper Shire

There are 250 congregations and about 400 priests in the Church of the Province of Central Africa.

== Doctrine and practice ==
The centre of the Church of the Province of Central Africa teaching is the life and resurrection of Jesus Christ. The basic teachings of the church, or catechism, include:

- Jesus Christ is fully human and fully God. He died and was resurrected from the dead.
- Jesus provides the way of eternal life for those who believe.
- The Old and New Testaments of the Bible were written by people "under the inspiration of the Holy Spirit". The Apocrypha are additional books that are used in Christian worship, but not for the formation of doctrine.
- The two great and necessary sacraments are Holy Baptism and Holy Eucharist
- Other sacramental rites are confirmation, ordination, marriage, reconciliation of a penitent, and unction.
- Belief in heaven, hell, and Jesus's return in glory.

The threefold sources of authority in Anglicanism are scripture, tradition, and reason (borrowing from Thomas Aquinas). These three sources uphold and critique each other in a dynamic way. This balance of scripture, tradition and reason is traced to the work of Richard Hooker, a sixteenth-century apologist. In Hooker's model, scripture is the primary means of arriving at doctrine and things stated plainly in scripture are accepted as true. Issues that are ambiguous are determined by tradition, which is checked by reason. Minor differences of doctrine should not damn or save the soul but are frameworks surrounding the moral and religious life of the believer. Church governance by bishops was biblical and traditional, but this was not license for absolutism.

== Ministry, liturgy and ecumenical relations ==
The Church of the Province of Central Africa embraces three orders of ministry: deacon, priest, and bishop. In 2023, the Church of the Province of Central Africa approved the ordination of women to the diaconate and to the priesthood, allowing each diocese to decide whether or not to ordain women. Local variants of the Book of Common Prayer are used in worship. Like many other Anglican churches, it is also a member of the ecumenical World Council of Churches.

== Anglican realignment ==
The Church of the Province of Central Africa is a member of the Global South. Former archbishop Bernard Malango was involved in the Anglican realignment, while current archbishop Albert Chama, despite having attended the Global South Fourth Encounter held in Singapore, on 19–23 April 2010, has been a supporter of "reconciliation" between the conservative and the liberal Anglican provinces. The Dioceses of Northern Malawi and Southern Malawi-Upper Shire were listed as "mission partners" of the Anglican Mission in the Americas, but are no longer listed as such. The province was represented at GAFCON III, on 17–22 June 2018, by a four-member delegation, with three from Malawi and one from Zimbabwe.

== See also ==
- List of Archbishops of Central Africa
