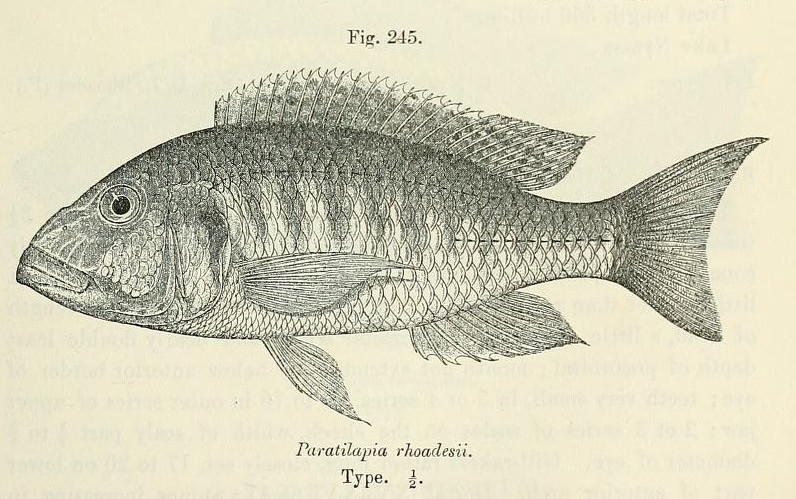

Conservation status
- Least Concern (IUCN 3.1)

Scientific classification
- Kingdom: Animalia
- Phylum: Chordata
- Class: Actinopterygii
- Order: Cichliformes
- Family: Cichlidae
- Genus: Buccochromis
- Species: B. rhoadesii

Binomial name
- Buccochromis rhoadesii (Boulenger, 1908)

Synonyms
- Paratilapia rhoadesii Boulenger, 1908; Cyrtocara rhoadesii (Boulenger, 1908); Haplochromis rhoadesii (Boulenger, 1908)

= Buccochromis rhoadesii =

Species of fish

Buccochromis rhoadesii is a species of haplochromine cichlid. It is endemic to Lake Malawi, Lake Malombe and the upper Shire River in the countries of Malawi, Mozambique, and Tanzania.

This is a piscivorous species which is found over softer substrates such as muddy or sandy areas as well as off beaches. It lives in small groups at depths of 15–30 metres (50–100 ft), these groups usually contain a single breeding male who creates a large heap of sand with a sloping surface for spawning on. The juveniles form large shoals.

The specific name honours Captain Edmund L. Rhoades, who commanded the British gunboat SS Gwendolen and who collected specimens of cichlids from Lake Malawi which he donated to the British Museum (Natural History).
