= Stripeback hap =

Conservation status
- Least Concern (IUCN 3.1)

Scientific classification
- Kingdom: Animalia
- Phylum: Chordata
- Class: Actinopterygii
- Order: Cichliformes
- Family: Cichlidae
- Genus: Buccochromis
- Species: B. nototaenia

Binomial name
- Buccochromis nototaenia (Boulenger, 1902)

Synonyms
- Paratilapia nototaenia Boulenger, 1902; Cyrtocara nototaenia (Boulenger, 1902); Haplochromis nototaenia (Boulenger, 1902); Buccochromis atritaeniatus (Regan, 1922); Buccochromis oculatus (Trewavas, 1935)

Species of fish

The stripeback hap (Buccochromis nototaenia) is a species of freshwater fish in the tribe Haplochromini, a part of the subfamily Pseudocrenilabrinae of the family Cichlidae.

It is endemic to Lake Malawi and Lake Malombe and is found in Malawi, Mozambique, and Tanzania. Some authorities classify Buccochromis atritaeniatus and Buccochromis oculatus as junior synonyms of B. nototaenia but this is not followed by FishBase.
