= Mangochi =

Town in the Southern Region of Malawi

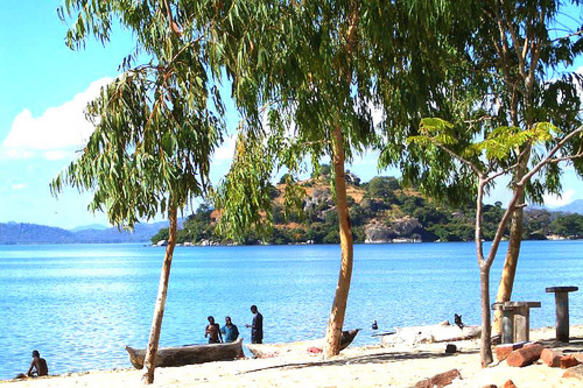
- Lake Malawi, on eastern edge of Mangochi

- Location in Malawi
- Coordinates: 14°27′36″S 35°16′12″E
- Country: Malawi
- Region: Southern Region
- District: Mangochi District
- Elevation: 1,541 ft (470 m)

Population (2018 Census)
  - Total: 53,498
  - Languages: Yao
- Time zone: +2
- Climate: Aw

Mangochi is a township in the Southern Region of Malawi. Located near the southern end of Lake Malawi, in colonial times it used to be called Fort Johnston. As of 2018, it has a population of 53,498.

== History ==
Mangochi was founded by colonial administrator Sir Harry Johnston in the 1890s as a British colonial defence post on the littoral plain of the Shire River's western shore.

David Livingstone, the Scottish missionary-explorer, visited the Mangochi area on multiple occasions. His first passage through the Shire Valley occurred in 1859 during his expeditions around Lake Nyasa (now Lake Malawi), and he returned to the region in 1861, where he observed the brutal operations of the Swahili-Arab slave trade centered in Mangochi and nearby towns.

The British gunboat Gwendolen, named after Lady Gwendolen Gascoyne-Cecil, daughter of the 3rd Marquess of Salisbury, was built in Mangochi in 1897. At 310 tonnes (340 short tons), it was the largest ship to sail on Lake Malawi.

In 1905 Mary Hall came through here as she travelled to be the first woman to journey from Cape Town to Cairo. She had arrived on the Monteith from Liwonde.

The gunboat, operated by the Protectorate of Nyasaland, is said to have fought the first naval battle of the First World War when it defeated the German vessel Hermann von Wissmann in August 1914. The boat was scrapped shortly after World War II.

Dzimwe Community Radio station began in 1998 in Mangochi assisted by Malawi Media Women's Association, UNESCO and later USAID.

Rioting in June 2003 injured three people. From March to November 2007, roughly 480 children were rescued from child labour on tobacco farms in Mangochi. In July 2008, elephants terrorised areas around Maldeco Fisheries in Mangochi and caused several deaths and damage to property, mainly crops. The Ministry of Tourism, Wildlife and Culture proposed moving the elephants into several game reserves, although the proposal stalled when some residents said they wanted the elephants to remain.

== Geography ==
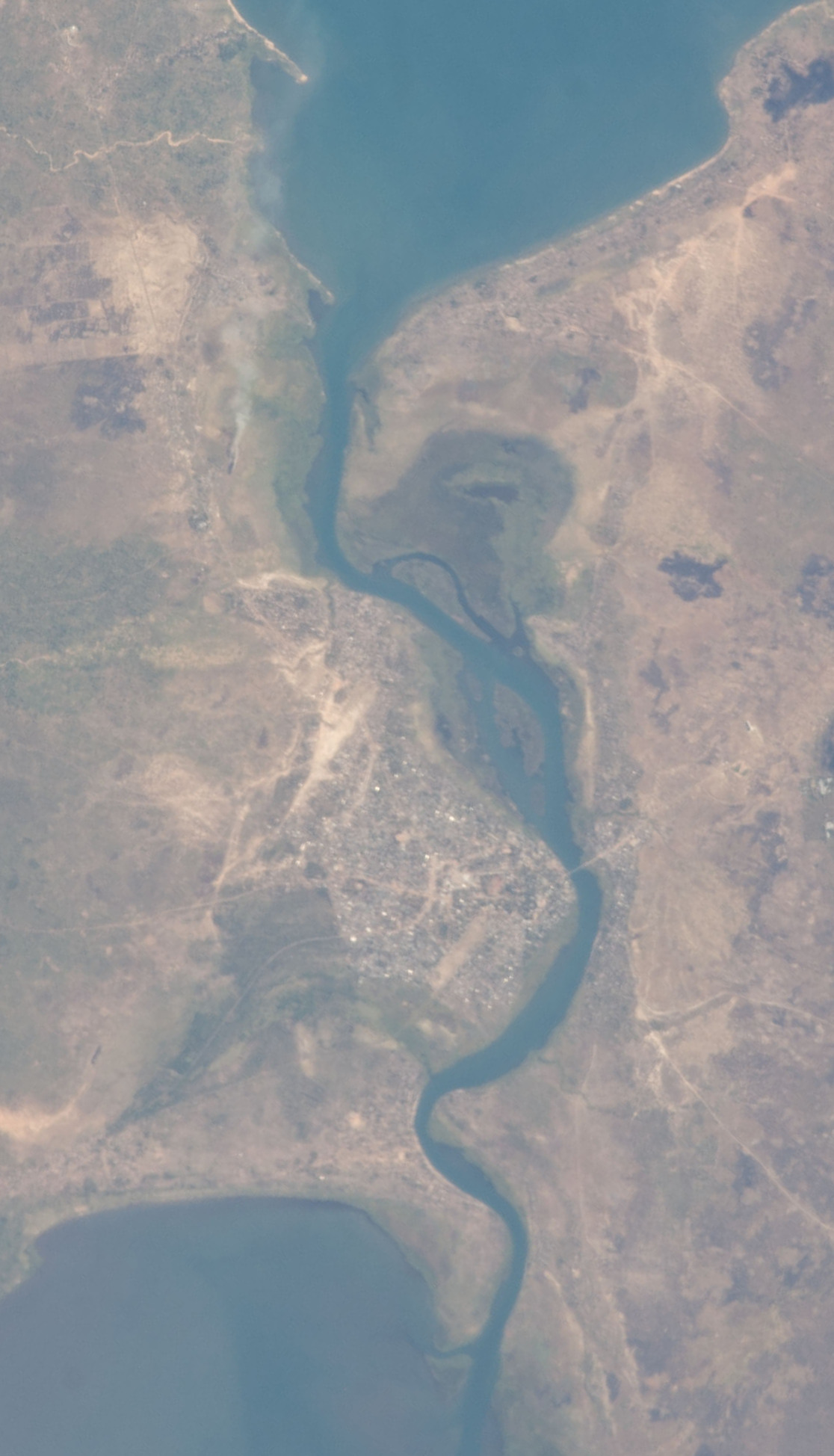
Shire River, Mangochi

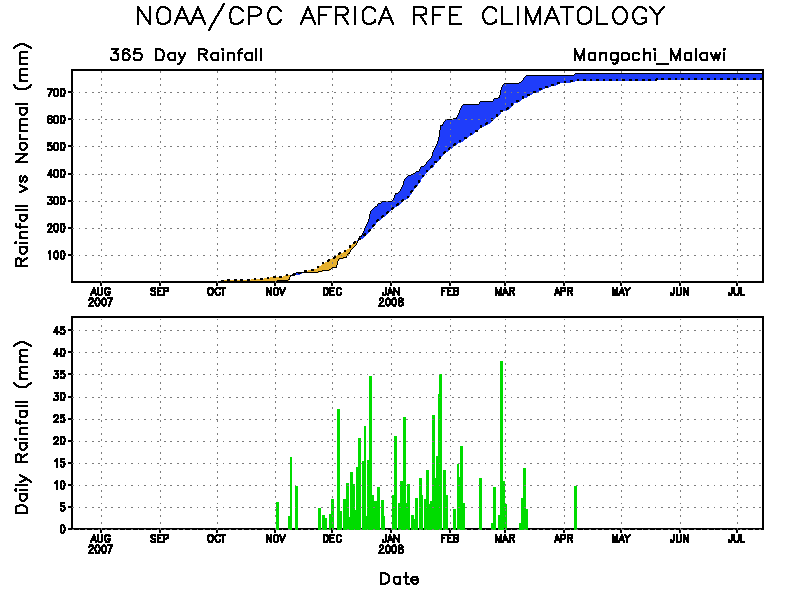
A diagram depicting the amount of rainfall in Mangochi from August 2007 to July 2008

Mangochi is at an elevation of 470 m (1,541 ft), near the southern end of Lake Malawi, between the main lakeshore road and the Shire River and 8 kilometres (5 miles) south of its entrance into Lake Malombe. The town is roughly 190 km (120 mi) northeast of Blantyre, Malawi's largest city. It is situated 2.2 km (1.4 mi) from Mponda, 3 km (1.9 mi) from M'baluku Laini, 23.7 km (14.73 mi) from Malindi, and 52 km (32 mi) from Chiponde, a neighboring town on the border with Mozambique.

== Climate ==
Mangochi has a tropical savanna climate (Köppen: Aw).

Climate data for Mangochi
Month	Jan	Feb	Mar	Apr	May	Jun	Jul	Aug	Sep	Oct	Nov	Dec	Year
Mean daily maximum °C (°F)	30.1 (86.2)	30.0 (86.0)	30.2 (86.4)	29.5 (85.1)	28.1 (82.6)	26.5 (79.7)	26.3 (79.3)	28.3 (82.9)	31.4 (88.5)	33.6 (92.5)	33.2 (91.8)	31.0 (87.8)	29.9 (85.8)
Daily mean °C (°F)	25.5 (77.9)	25.4 (77.7)	25.3 (77.5)	24.3 (75.7)	22.1 (71.8)	20.3 (68.5)	20.1 (68.2)	21.8 (71.2)	24.5 (76.1)	26.9 (80.4)	27.3 (81.1)	26.1 (79.0)	24.1 (75.4)
Mean daily minimum °C (°F)	21.6 (70.9)	21.5 (70.7)	21.1 (70.0)	19.8 (67.6)	16.7 (62.1)	14.2 (57.6)	14.3 (57.7)	15.4 (59.7)	17.8 (64.0)	20.8 (69.4)	22.0 (71.6)	22.0 (71.6)	18.9 (66.0)
Average precipitation mm (inches)	194.2 (7.65)	200.8 (7.91)	144.0 (5.67)	36.6 (1.44)	5.7 (0.22)	4.4 (0.17)	3.9 (0.15)	1.5 (0.06)	3.0 (0.12)	15.9 (0.63)	64.2 (2.53)	172.0 (6.77)	846.2 (33.31)
Average precipitation days (≥ 0.3 mm)	16	14	13	6	2	2	2	2	1	2	7	14	81
Average relative humidity (%)	78	78	76	73	60	66	62	57	50	50	59	72	65
Mean monthly sunshine hours	204.6	187.6	238.7	252.0	279.0	255.0	257.3	279.0	288.0	300.7	258.0	207.7	3,007.6
Mean daily sunshine hours	6.6	6.7	7.7	8.4	9.0	8.5	8.3	9.0	9.6	9.7	8.6	6.7	8.2
Source: NOAA

== Demographics ==
=== Population development ===
Year	Population
1977	3,341
1987	14,758
1998	26,570
2008	39,575
2018	53,498

Historical population
Year	Pop.	±% p.a.
1977	3,341	—
1987	14,758	+16.02%
1998	26,570	+5.49%
2008	39,575	+4.06%
2018	53,498	+3.06%

=== Languages and ethnicities ===
Yao, specifically the Mangochi dialect, is the main language spoken in this town. A Swahili settlement was also established in Mangochi. Mangochi is mainly inhabited by the Yao people.

== Economy ==
Mangochi was developed as an agricultural centre and has marine-engineering shops. Cash crops grown in the area include tobacco, cotton, and groundnuts. Rice and maize are intensively grown along the lakeshore, and commercial fishing is also important.

== Notable people ==
Nthanda Manduwi is an entrepreneur and author who was born here in 1995.

== Facilities ==
=== Amenities ===
Amenities include several shops, supermarkets, a post office and banks.

=== Bridges ===
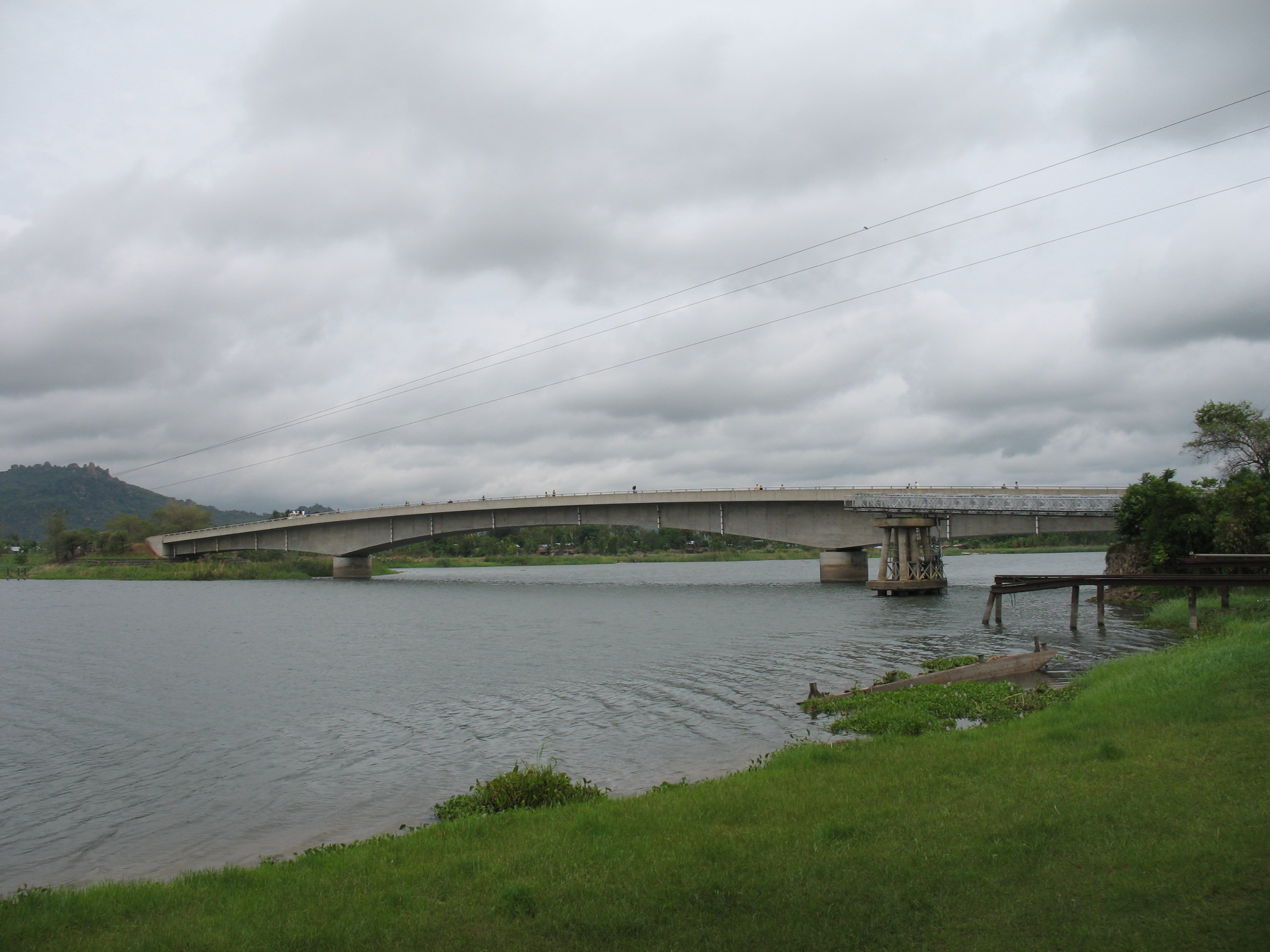
Bakili Muluzi Bridge in Mangochi crossing the river Shire.

Within Mangochi there is the Bakili Muluzi Bridge, which Lonely Planet described as "scenic".

=== Museums ===
The Lake Malawi Museum houses ethnic, environmental, and historical exhibits. They include the Hotchkiss gun with which the British gunboat Gwendolen defeated the German gunboat Hermann von Wissmann with a single shot in their brief naval engagement in August 1914. The museum has also a scale model of the Gwendolen. An even older exhibit is a marine steam engine that was built in 1898 and powered the Universities' Mission to Central Africa's SS Chauncy Maples until 1953.

=== Religion ===
Mangochi is home to a large mosque as well as a modern Catholic Cathedral. The city has the largest Muslim population in terms of percent.

=== Clocks ===
Mangochi is home to a clock tower erected in honour of Queen Victoria, dating back to the early 20th century.

== Transport ==
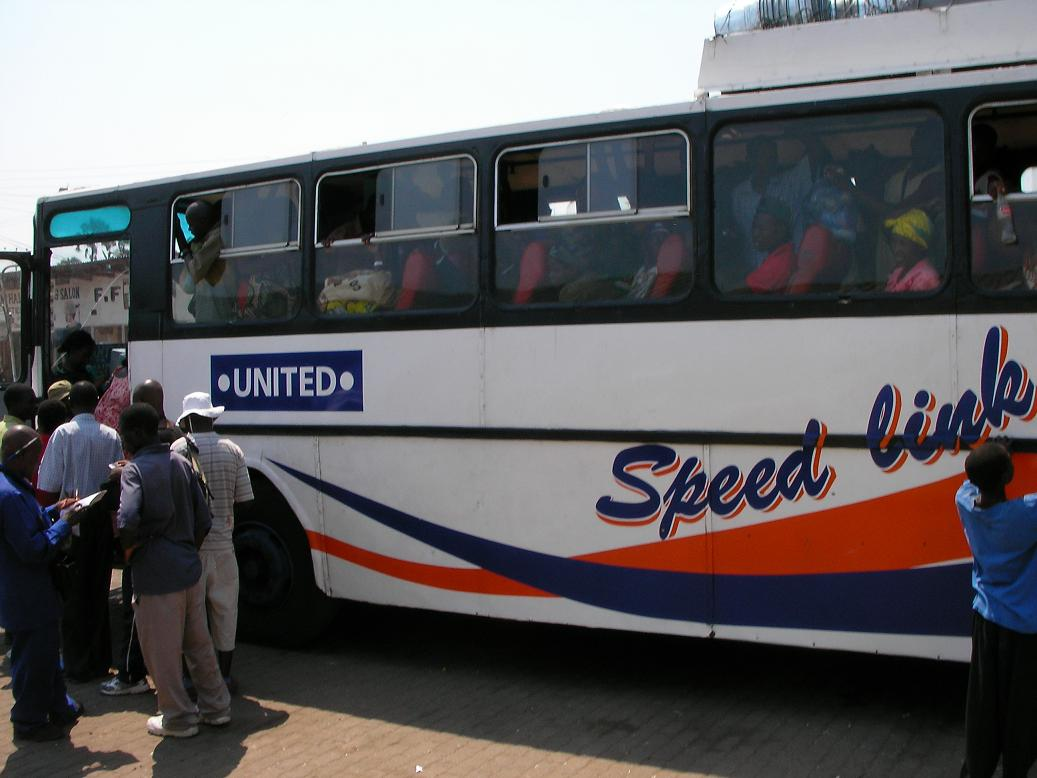
Passengers boarding at the bus station

Mangochi is located just off the M3 road. All buses travelling from Monkey Bay to Blantyre stop in Mangochi. Minibuses travel to Liwonde, Zomba, and Blantyre. Matolas travel to Liwonde National Park and to the border town of Chiponde.

== Tourism ==
Mangochi is described by Lonely Planet as having a "vaguely Swahili feel", with "palm trees, Arab-looking people and coconuts for sale in the street." There are several guesthouses and lodges for tourists in Mangochi.
