= Corematodus taeniatus =

Conservation status
- Least Concern (IUCN 3.1)

Scientific classification
- Kingdom: Animalia
- Phylum: Chordata
- Class: Actinopterygii
- Order: Cichliformes
- Family: Cichlidae
- Genus: Corematodus
- Species: C. taeniatus

Binomial name
- Corematodus taeniatus Trewavas, 1935

Species of fish

Corematodus taeniatus is a species of haplochromine cichlid endemic to Lake Malawi, Lake Malombe and the upper Shire River in East Africa. It is a generalized aggressive mimic of various sand-dwelling cichlids. It is therefore able to approach unsuspecting schools of these species and rapidly take a mouthful of scales or fin.
