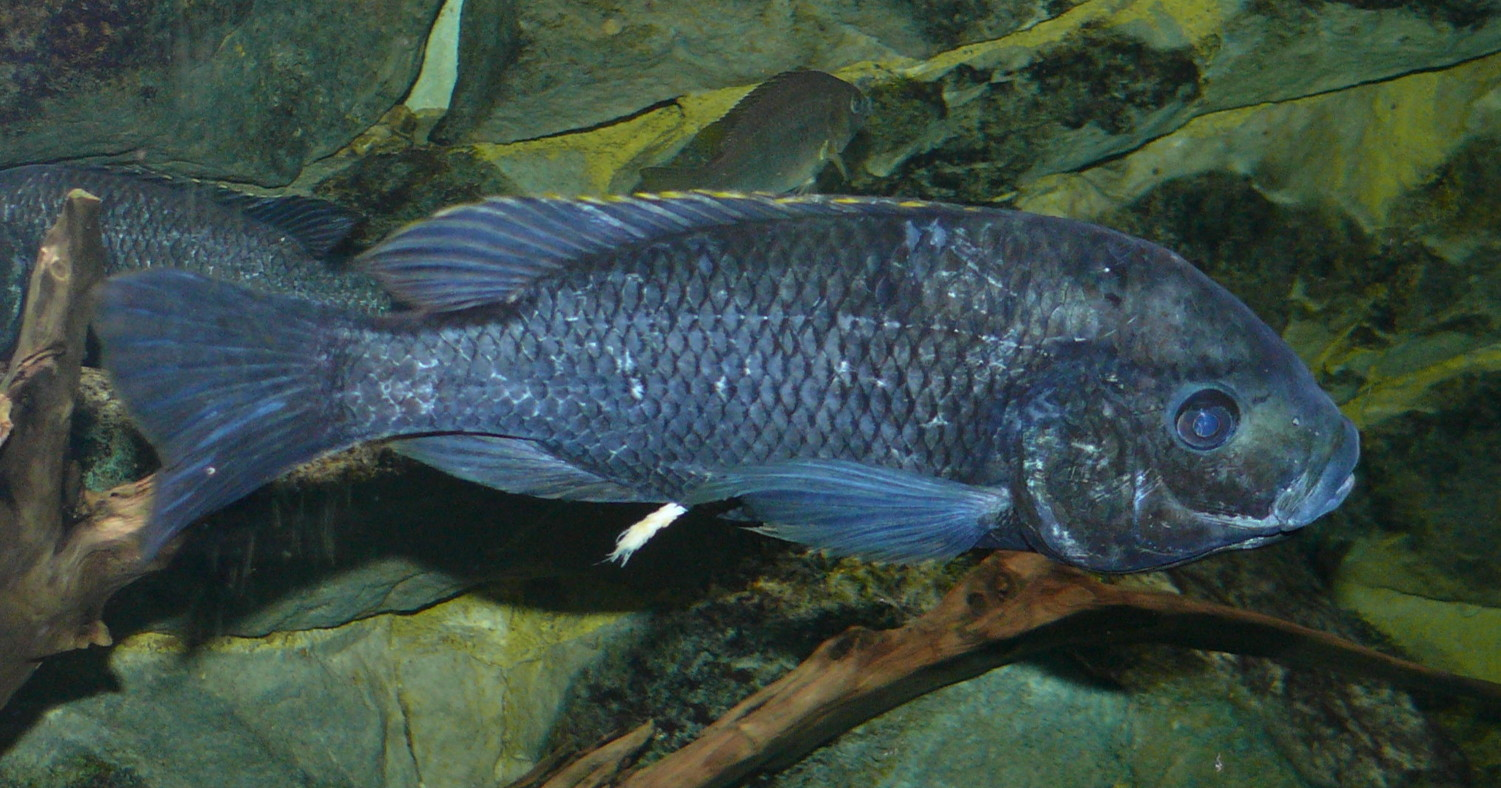
- Adult male. Note white genital tassels (longer when fully extended)

Conservation status
- Critically Endangered (IUCN 3.1)

Scientific classification
- Kingdom: Animalia
- Phylum: Chordata
- Class: Actinopterygii
- Order: Cichliformes
- Family: Cichlidae
- Genus: Oreochromis
- Species: O. squamipinnis

Binomial name
- Oreochromis squamipinnis (Günther, 1864)

Synonyms
- Chromis squamipinnis Günther, 1864; Sarotherodon squamipinnis (Günther, 1864); Tilapia squamipinnis (Günther, 1864)

= Oreochromis squamipinnis =

Species of fish

Oreochromis squamipinnis is a critically endangered species of cichlid fish that is endemic to Lake Malawi, Lake Malombe and Shire River in East Africa, where found in a wide range of habitats, but especially in shallow water. This species is important to local commercial fisheries and can also be found in the aquarium trade, but it has declined drastically due to overfishing.

This species can reach a standard length of 36 cm (14 in). Females and immatures resemble O. karongae and O. lidole, but mature males have pale upper heads unlike mature males of those species.

It is part of the subgenus Nyasalapia, which are known as chambo. The breeding males in this subgenus have long genital tassels (a 17 cm or 6.7 in long O. squamipinnis had tassels that were 9 cm or 3.5 in), which somewhat resemble fish eggs. During breeding, the female attempts to pick them up with her mouth and this helps the male in fertilizing the female's eggs, already in her mouth. It mainly feeds on phytoplankton, but also eats zooplankton and detritus.

The lepidophagous cichlid Corematodus shiranus is an aggressive mimic of chambo in both color pattern and swimming mode. It is, therefore, able to approach unsuspecting schools of O. squamipinnis and rapidly take a mouthful of scales or fin.
