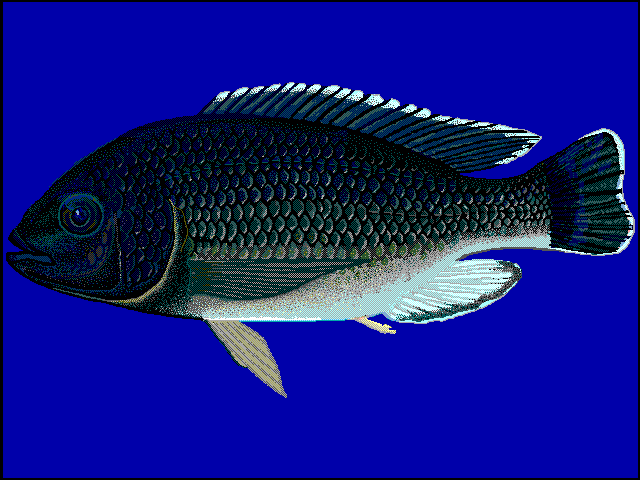

Conservation status
- Critically Endangered (IUCN 3.1)

Scientific classification
- Kingdom: Animalia
- Phylum: Chordata
- Class: Actinopterygii
- Order: Cichliformes
- Family: Cichlidae
- Genus: Oreochromis
- Species: O. karongae

Binomial name
- Oreochromis karongae (Trewavas, 1941)

Synonyms
- Tilapia karongae Trewavas, 1941; Sarotherodon karongae (Trewavas, 1941)

= Oreochromis karongae =

Species of fish

Oreochromis karongae is a critically endangered species of cichlid that is endemic to Lake Malawi, Lake Malombe, and upper and middle Shire River in Malawi, Mozambique, and Tanzania. This species is important to local commercial fisheries, but has declined drastically due to overfishing.

It can reach a total length of 42 centimetres (17 in). Breeding males are black with white edges to the fins and are extremely similar to breeding male O. lidole, while females are more yellowish-brown than females of O. lidole and O. squamipinnis.

It is part of the subgenus Nyasalapia, which are known as chambo. A taxonomic review recommended that O. saka should be considered a synonym of O. karongae (the two only differ by pharyngeal bones and teeth), but at present both are considered valid by FishBase.

The breeding males of chambo have long genital tassels that somewhat resemble fish eggs. During breeding, the female attempts to pick them up with her mouth and this helps the male in fertilizing the female's eggs, already in her mouth. O. karongae mainly feeds on phytoplankton, including diatoms.

The lepidophagous cichlid Corematodus shiranus is an aggressive mimic of chambo in both color pattern and swimming mode. It is, therefore, able to approach unsuspecting schools of chambo and rapidly take a mouthful of scales or fin.
