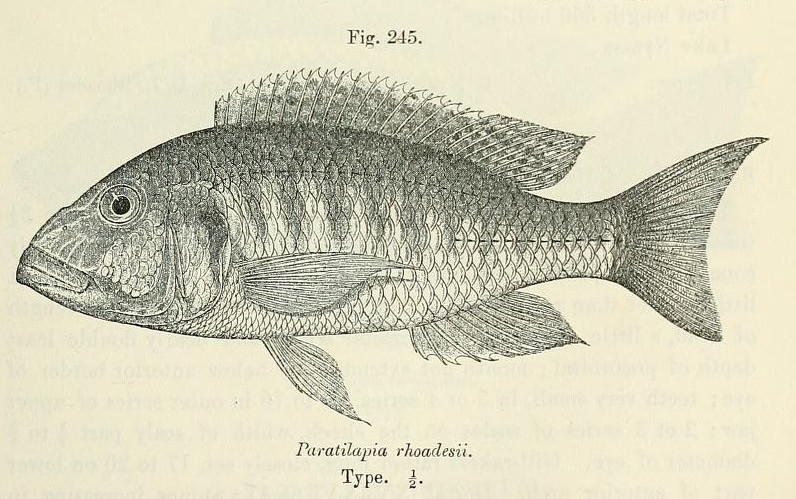
- Buccochromis rhoadesii

Scientific classification
- Kingdom: Animalia
- Phylum: Chordata
- Class: Actinopterygii
- Order: Cichliformes
- Family: Cichlidae
- Tribe: Haplochromini
- Genus: Buccochromis; Eccles & Trewavas, 1989

Type species
- Paratilapia nototaenia Boulenger, 1902

= Buccochromis =

Genus of fishes

Buccochromis is a genus of relatively large haplochromine cichlids endemic to Lake Malawi and the upper Shire River in East Africa.

== Species ==
There are currently seven recognized species in this genus:

- Buccochromis atritaeniatus (Regan, 1922)
- Buccochromis heterotaenia (Trewavas, 1935)
- Buccochromis lepturus (Regan, 1922) (Slendertail Hap)
- Buccochromis nototaenia (Boulenger, 1902) (Stripeback Hap)
- Buccochromis oculatus (Trewavas, 1935)
- Buccochromis rhoadesii (Boulenger, 1908)
- Buccochromis spectabilis (Trewavas, 1935)
