= Buccochromis heterotaenia =

Conservation status
- Least Concern (IUCN 3.1)

Scientific classification
- Kingdom: Animalia
- Phylum: Chordata
- Class: Actinopterygii
- Order: Cichliformes
- Family: Cichlidae
- Genus: Buccochromis
- Species: B. heterotaenia

Binomial name
- Buccochromis heterotaenia (Trewavas, 1935)

Synonyms
- Haplochromis heterotaenia Trewavas, 1935; Cyrtocara heterotaenia (Trewavas, 1935)

Species of fish

Buccochromis heterotaenia is a species of haplochromine cichlid and it is endemic to Lake Malawi, being found in Malawi, Mozambique, and Tanzania.

Buccochromis heterotaenia occurs in the deeper, rocky areas of Lake Malawi where it is a piscivorous predator which sometimes hunts in groups. When breeding, the males construct a semi=circular spawning area adjacent to a large boulder. The female lays up to 500 eggs which she mouthbroods before moving into shallower waters to release the fry, which she continues to tend for some time after they are free swimming.
