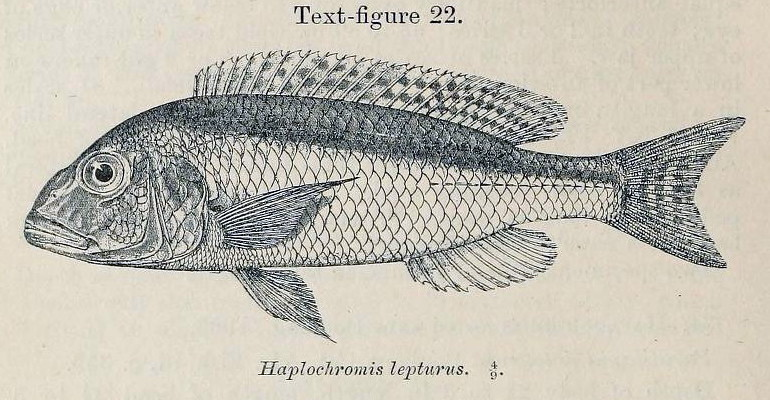

Conservation status
- Least Concern (IUCN 3.1)

Scientific classification
- Kingdom: Animalia
- Phylum: Chordata
- Class: Actinopterygii
- Order: Cichliformes
- Family: Cichlidae
- Genus: Buccochromis
- Species: B. lepturus

Binomial name
- Buccochromis lepturus (Regan, 1922)

= Slender tail hap =

Species of fish

The slender tail hap (short for "haplochromine") (Buccochromis lepturus), is a species of fish in the, tribe Haplochromini part of the subfamily Pseudocrenilabrinae of the family Cichlidae.

It is endemic to Lake Malawi in East Africa. Its natural habitat is freshwater lakes.
