= Battle of Lake Nyasa =

Battle during the First World War

- Part of the East African campaign of the First World War
- Captain Rhoades photographed on the Gwendolen c. 1905
Date	13 August 1914
Location	Lake Nyasa, Africa 11°5′42″S 34°38′24″E
Result	British victory

Belligerents
Britain: Nyasaland	German Empire: German East Africa

Commanders and leaders
(United Kingdom) Captain Edmund Rhoades	(German Empire) Captain Berndt

Strength
1 gunboat	1 gunboat

Casualties and losses
None	No human losses 1 gunboat temporarily disabled
- Location within Tanzania Battle of Lake Nyasa (Africa)

The Battle of Lake Nyasa was a minor naval skirmish that took place on Lake Nyasa between the British gunboat SS Gwendolen and the German gunboat Hermann von Wissman on 13 August 1914. It was one of the first naval engagements of the First World War.

== Background ==
Between the 1890s and 1918, Lake Nyasa's administration was split between the British Protectorate of Nyasaland, Portuguese Mozambique, and German East Africa. Both the United Kingdom and the German Empire stationed naval units on Lake Nyasa in the years preceding the First World War. The German Hermann von Wissman was launched in 1890 as an anti-slavery gunboat, and was the only German war vessel on the lake. Its counterpart, the British SS Gwendolen, was launched several years later in 1899, as one of three British war vessels on the lake. The Wissman and Gwendolen were of comparable firepower and overall size. Both also occupied certain limited non-military roles, including transporting cargo and passengers.

The outbreak of World War I on 28 July 1914, and the subsequent British entry into the war the following week, prompted Nyasaland's colonial governor, George Smith, to issue an order on 8 August 1914 to all British ships in the area to locate the Wissman and render it immobile, or according to some accounts, to "sink, burn or destroy" the vessel.

Although Gwendolen was fitted with a QF 6-pounder Hotchkiss gun, none of the crew knew how to operate it, until a shopkeeper was found who had previously been a member of the Royal Naval Volunteer Reserve in Scotland; a box of ammunition was eventually located in a workshop. A force of twenty-five Askaris of the King's African Rifles were embarked and several days of training followed.

The crew of the Gwendolen received reports that the Wissman was seen docked, near Sphinxhaven (modern Liuli), a German port on their southernmost portion of the coast. The Gwendolen sailed north in an attempt to intercept the Wissman.

== Battle ==
On 13 August 1914, the SS Gwendolen, commanded by Captain Edmund Rhoades, found the Hermann Von Wissman undergoing repairs on a slipway near Sphinxhaven, German East Africa. The Gwendolen launched a single cannon shot, disabling the German ship without any human losses. Captain Berndt, who was unaware of the war, and who was acquainted with Rhoades, rowed to the Gwendolen on a dinghy, where he was subsequently captured, along with the Chief Engineer and four other crew members. When the repairs necessarily to refloat the vessel seemed too impractical, the crew of the Gwendolen left the Wissman docked where it was, and British engineers spent the following days dismantling parts of the ship.

== Aftermath ==
By 16 August 1914, the SS Gwendolen returned to the British port of Fort Johnston. The quick and bloodless victory early into the war was celebrated by both colonial elites, including Secretary of State for the Colonies Lewis Harcourt, and British newspapers. The victory itself allowed British troops and supply to sail across Lake Nyasa uncontested, supporting early campaigns into German East Africa.

The Hermann von Wissman was recaptured and repaired by German forces in early 1915. However, it would be captured again by British forces on 30 May 1915, where it would remain under British authority after the war.
