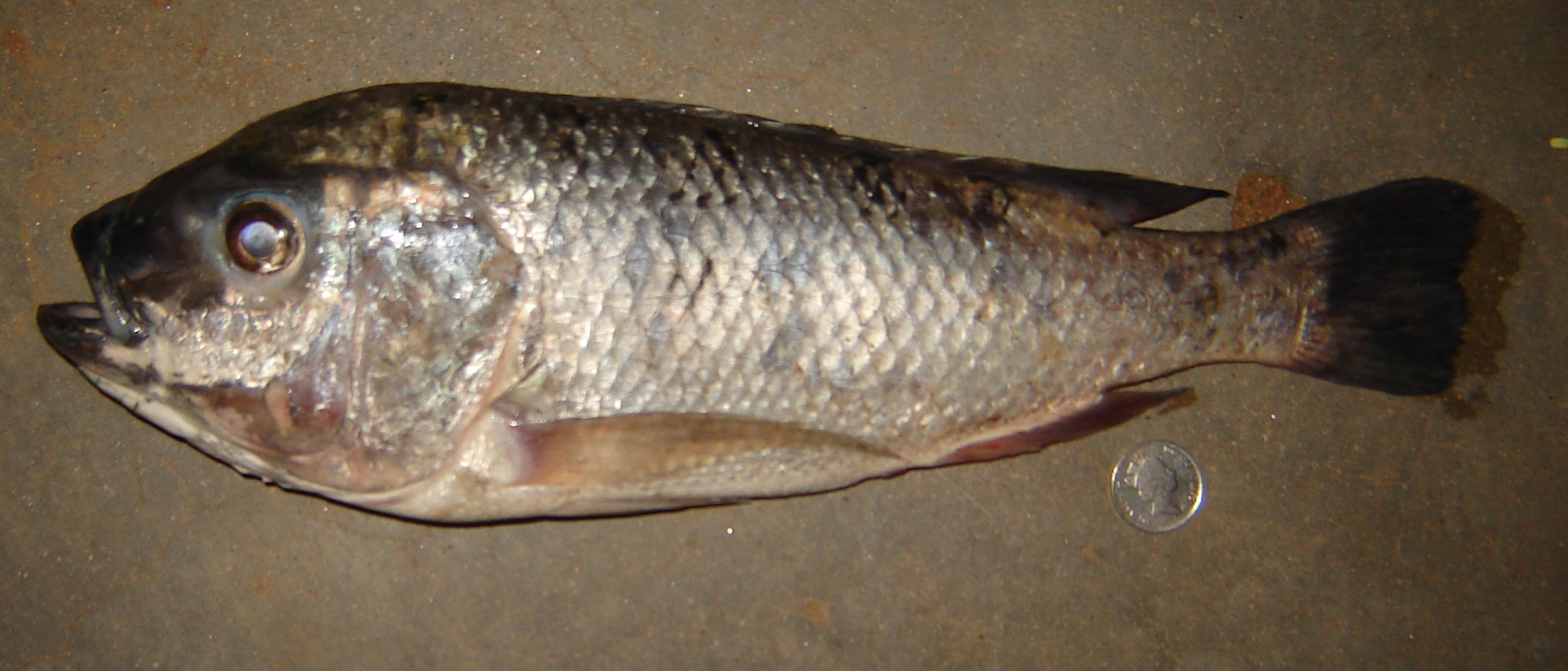
- Emaciated ('spent') female from Malembo, Lake Malawi
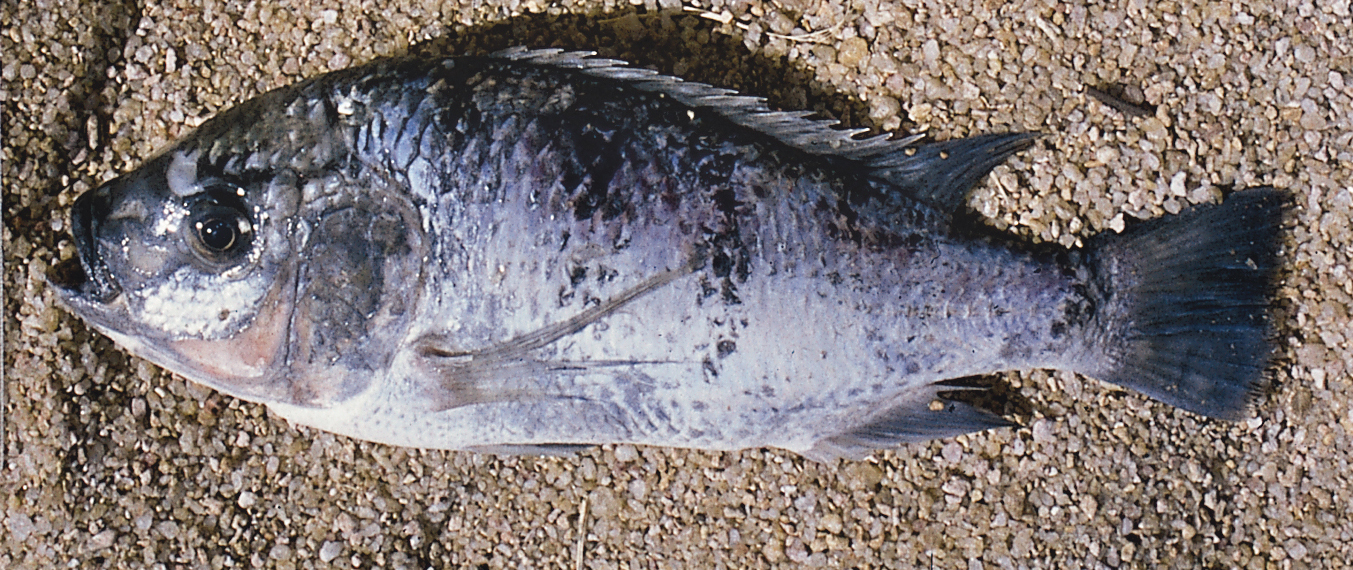
- Juvenile from Cape Maclear, Lake Malawi

Conservation status
- Critically endangered, possibly extinct (IUCN 3.1)

Scientific classification
- Kingdom: Animalia
- Phylum: Chordata
- Class: Actinopterygii
- Order: Cichliformes
- Family: Cichlidae
- Genus: Oreochromis
- Species: O. lidole

Binomial name
- Oreochromis lidole (Trewavas, 1941)

Synonyms
- Tilapia lidole Trewavas, 1941; Sarotherodon lidole (Trewavas, 1941)

= Oreochromis lidole =

Species of fish

Oreochromis lidole is a species of freshwater fish in the family Cichlidae. This tilapia is native to Malawi, Mozambique and Tanzania, where it is found in Lake Malawi, Lake Malombe, the Shire River and perhaps some crater lakes further north. It is important in fisheries, but has drastically declined; it may already be extinct. This oreochromine cichlid is locally called chambo, a name also used for two other closely related species found in the same region, O. karongae and O. squamipinnis.

== Names ==
The species was described as Tilapia lidole in 1941 by the British ichthyologist Ethelwynn Trewavas, from specimens she had collected on a fishery survey of Lake Malawi in 1939. She reported that the name was derived from the local name 'dole', although it was also known as galamula or lolo, or more generally as chambo along with similar tilapia species. Along with other mouthbrooding tilapia species, it was reclassified in the genus Sarotherodon in 1976, and later moved into the genus Oreochromis, along with other species showing clear sexual dimorphism (differences in size, shape and colour between the sexes). It has also been included in the subgenus Nyasalapia along with other species where the males develop long, branching genital papillae.

== Distinguishing features ==
Juveniles of the various chambo species are essentially indistinguishable from one another, but collectively can be identified by their silvery body, tapering vertical bars and 'tilapia spot' on the lower part of the soft rayed part of the dorsal fin. Oreochromis lidole can be distinguished from the other closely related 'chambo' species at lengths of about 17–20 cm (6.7–7.9 in) or greater, as it generally assumes a big-headed, skinny appearance, resulting from its shallower body, larger mouth and bigger opercular plates (gill-covers). The jaw teeth are set in a 3-4 clearly separated rows, whereas other species often have more or less regularly spaced rows. Dissection can reveal the long, slender lower pharyngeal bone with very slender toothed areas. During the breeding seasons, males become jet black, with white margins to the unpaired fins, which is similar to those of O. karongae, but enables them to be distinguished from those of O. squamipinnis.

== Reproductive biology ==
Like all other known Oreochromis, O. lidole is a maternal mouthbrooder: females carry the eggs and small juveniles in their mouths for several weeks. When juveniles have absorbed their yolk sacs, they are released to forage independently, under the female's guard, but are allowed to return to their mother's mouth when danger threatens. Females produce up to 700 young and have been recorded to guard fry up to 5 cm (2.0 in) long. Breeding mainly occurs during the hot season from October to January, when males gather in deep water (mainly 20–45 m (66–148 ft)) off clean, steeply shelving beaches to dig huge craters (1–3 m (3 ft 3 in – 9 ft 10 in) in diameter) in which courtship and spawning takes place. Females often migrate to more productive turbid waters to release their young, in areas such as Lake Malombe.

== Diet ==
Oreochromis lidole feeds mainly on plankton- including crustaceans, such as Bosmina and Diaptomus, diatoms such as Aulacoseira and Surirella and other larger algae.

== Distribution ==
Oreochromis lidole has been recorded from throughout Lake Malawi, where it tends to live in deeper, less muddy habitats than related chambo species, although they are often found together in the same fisherman's catch, suggesting they may shoal together. Like other chambo, they are rarely caught deeper than around 50 m. Juveniles and brooding females tend to be found in shallower, muddier water, in places such as Lake Malombe. The species was reportedly most common in the productive southern arms of the lake, and rare off muddy or rocky coasts.

== Crater lake populations ==
Some specimens reportedly collected from Lake Tschungruru in Tanzania were identified as O. lidole by Trewavas. This lake appears to be the Kiungululu Crater (9°18′24.06″S 33°51′54.31″E), which is situated at an altitude of around 450 m (1,480 ft) above the present surface of Lake Malawi. Some of these fish were sexually mature at sizes of 14–17 cm (5.5–6.7 in), which is much smaller than mature fish in Lake Malawi. Subsequently, smallish mature specimens were also collected from Lake Kingiri, which is only about 50 m (160 ft) higher up than the main lake (9°25′07.67"S 33°51′29.29″E). These identifications have not been confirmed by recent surveys of these lakes.

== Exploitation and conservation status ==
Oreochromis lidole was formerly an important food fish on Lake Malawi. It was particularly abundant in the catches of trawlers operating in the South Eastern Arm from Maldeco. A study by Turner found populations of all chambo species declined drastically in the 1990s. Catches of chambo in one part of the southern arm of Lake Malawi dropped from 70 kg (150 lb) a boat a day to 4.5 kg (9.9 lb) in the period between 2006 and 2016. Despite hundreds of chambo being caught every day, because no one has identified these chambo as specifically O. lidole as of 2016, the IUCN stated that no one knows for sure if anyone has seen O. lidole since Turner last identified a fish as such in 1992, and thus declared that it may be extinct for all anyone knows.
