= Buccochromis spectabilis =

Conservation status
- Least Concern (IUCN 3.1)

Scientific classification
- Kingdom: Animalia
- Phylum: Chordata
- Class: Actinopterygii
- Order: Cichliformes
- Family: Cichlidae
- Genus: Buccochromis
- Species: B. spectabilis

Binomial name
- Buccochromis spectabilis (Trewavas, 1935)

Synonyms
- Haplochromis spectabilis Trewavas, 1935; Cyrtocara spectabilis (Trewavas, 1935)

Species of fish

Buccochromis spectabilis is a species of haplochromine cichlid. It is endemic to Lake Malawi in Malawi, Mozambique, and Tanzania. It lives in shallow waters near the lake shore.
