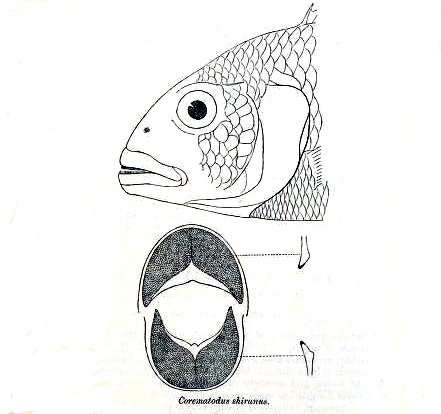
- Corematodus shiranus

Scientific classification
- Kingdom: Animalia
- Phylum: Chordata
- Class: Actinopterygii
- Order: Cichliformes
- Family: Cichlidae
- Tribe: Haplochromini
- Genus: Corematodus; Boulenger, 1897

Type species
- Corematodus shiranus Boulenger, 1897

= Corematodus =

Genus of fishes

Corematodus is a small genus of haplochromine cichlids native to the Lake Malawi basin in Africa. They feed on scales and fins of other cichlids.

== Species ==
There are currently two recognized species in this genus:

- Corematodus shiranus Boulenger, 1897
- Corematodus taeniatus Trewavas, 1935
