= Oreochromis saka =

Scientific classification
- Domain: Eukaryota
- Kingdom: Animalia
- Phylum: Chordata
- Class: Actinopterygii
- Order: Cichliformes
- Family: Cichlidae
- Genus: Oreochromis
- Species: O. saka

Binomial name
- Oreochromis saka (Lowe, 1953)

Synonyms
- Tilapia saka Lowe, 1953; Sarotherodon saka (Lowe, 1953)

Species of fish

Oreochromis saka is a species of cichlid fish that is endemic to Lake Malawi and Lake Malombe in East Africa where it inhabits relatively shallow coastal areas. It can reach a standard length of 36 cm (14 in). It is part of the subgenus Nyasalapia, which are known as chambo. The validity of this species is questionable and a taxonomic review recommended that it should be considered a synonym of O. karongae (the two only differ by pharyngeal bones and teeth).
