= Deutsche Flagge über Sand und Palmen =

1936 Nazi German book

Deutsche Flagge über Sand und Palmen: 53 Kolonialkrieger erzählen
- Author: Werner von Langsdorff (pseudonym Thor Goote)
- Language: German
- Genre: Colonial literature, historical accounts
- Publisher: Bertelsmann, Gütersloh
- Publication date: 1936
- Publication place: Germany
- Pages: 380

Deutsche Flagge über Sand und Palmen: 53 Kolonialkrieger erzählen (“German Flag over Sand and Palms: 53 colonial warriors tell their stories”) is a 1936 German book, published during the Nazi era, written by Werner von Langsdorff (pseudonym Thor Goote), a professor and aeronautical engineer, known for his war novels. The work compiles 53 first-hand accounts of German colonial soldiers, officers, and administrators, focusing on experiences in Germany's former colonies, particularly during the First World War.

According to the German historian Gerhard Wiechmann (de) this popular narrative was already used to revive the idea of colonialism.

== Overview ==
The book presents a mix of personal narratives, military reports, and expedition experiences, emphasizing the heroism and patriotism of German colonial forces. While primarily documenting military engagements, it also touches upon encounters with local populations, the challenges of colonial administration, and geographical exploration.

A notable inclusion is a historical essay by the Brandenburg officer Otto Friedrich von der Gröben (1657–1728) on the founding of the first German colony, linking early colonial history to the narratives of the 19th and 20th centuries.

Further contributors to the book are Hermann von Wissmann, Carl Peters, Heinrich Ernst Göring, Theodor Leutwein, Paul von Lettow-Vorbeck, Ludwig von Estorff, Paul Leutwein, Walther Wülfing, Julius Steinhardt, Bernhard Voigt, Maximilian Zupitza, Wilhelm Methner, Alexander von Scheele, Titus Türk, Carl Zimmermann and many other personal accounts and eyewitnesses of German colonialism.

== Publication and reception ==
Published by Bertelsmann in Gütersloh in 1936, the book included forewords by Paul von Lettow-Vorbeck and Reichsstatthalter Ritter von Epp, reflecting its alignment with nationalist and colonial revivalist ideologies of the time. Contemporary reception praised the book as an authentic portrayal of German colonial experiences, though it also can be viewed as ideologically influenced propaganda that glorifies colonial violence and racial hierarchies.

According to the “nationalist vision of a community without classes and races”, an article in the publication edited by Michael Perraudin and Juergen Zimmerer further comments:

At least four of these texts explicitly deal with the topos of the loyal Askari, and the last one is even entitled Schwarze Kameraden (Black Comrades). This is remarkable not because German virtues like loyalty, courage in war, or readiness to make sacrifices are praised, but rather because, since the Nazi burning of the books in 1933, terms such as "comrades" and "comradeship" had been exclusively connected to the nationalist vision of a community without classes and races, and to the "spirit of the front." This notion of comradeship with natives was necessarily in conflict with the contemporary vision of an Aryan master race.

== See also ==
- Colonial troops
- Colonial war
- First World War in Africa
- Peter Moors Fahrt nach Südwest. Ein Feldzugsbericht (Gustav Frenssen, 1906)

== Bibliography ==
- Werner von Langsdorff: Deutsche Flagge über Sand und Palmen: 53 Kolonialkrieger erzählen. Bertelsmann, Gütersloh 1936
- Michael Perraudin, Juergen Zimmerer (eds.): German Colonialism and National Identity. 2010
- Gerhard Wiechmann: Guerilla und small wars. Vom kolonialen Kleinkrieg zum Polizeikampf: Formen „Asymmetrischer Kriegführung“ im Spiegel deutscher militärischer und polizeilicher Konzepte und Diskurse 1875–1935 und 1950–1976 in transnationaler Perspektive. Oldenburg: BIS der Universität Oldenburg, 2022 (Online)
