= Buccochromis oculatus =

Conservation status
- Least Concern (IUCN 3.1)

Scientific classification
- Kingdom: Animalia
- Phylum: Chordata
- Class: Actinopterygii
- Order: Cichliformes
- Family: Cichlidae
- Genus: Buccochromis
- Species: B. oculatus

Binomial name
- Buccochromis oculatus (Trewavas, 1935)

Synonyms
- Haplochromis oculatus Trewavas, 1935; Cyrtocara oculata (Trewavas, 1935)

Species of fish

Buccochromis oculatus is a species of haplochromine cichlid. It is endemic to Lake Malawi where it is found at 18 meters depth in Malawi, Mozambique, and Tanzania. Its natural habitat is freshwater lakes. The only threat may be potential overfishing. This taxon is regarded a junior synonym of Buccochromis nototaenia by the IUCN (International Union for Conservation of Nature).

== Sources ==
- Kazembe, J., Makocho, P. & Mailosi, A. 2005. Buccochromis oculatus. 2006 IUCN Red List of Threatened Species. Downloaded on 4 August 2007.
