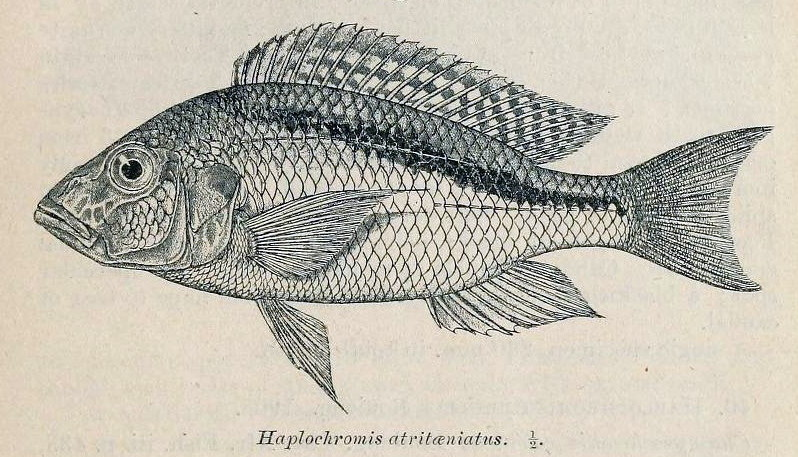

Conservation status
- Least Concern (IUCN 3.1)

Scientific classification
- Kingdom: Animalia
- Phylum: Chordata
- Class: Actinopterygii
- Order: Cichliformes
- Family: Cichlidae
- Genus: Buccochromis
- Species: B. atritaeniatus

Binomial name
- Buccochromis atritaeniatus (Regan, 1922)

Synonyms
- Haplochromis atritaeniatus Regan, 1922; Cyrtocara atritaeniata (Regan, 1922)

= Buccochromis atritaeniatus =

Species of fish

Buccochromis atritaeniatus is a species of haplochromine cichlid. It is found in Lake Malawi in Malawi, Mozambique, and Tanzania. Its natural habitat is freshwater lakes and intermediate and sandy areas and has been caught between 10 and 40 meters; it feeds on Haplochromines and hunts in pairs or large groups. Breeding males are found in colonies at depths about 30 meters and, while breeding, build sandcastle nests on steeply sloping sandy shores. The only known threat is fisheries and is known as Haplochromis mbowe in the fishing trade. Although FishBase and the Catalog of Fishes recognise this species, the IUCN treats it as a junior synonym of Buccochromis nototaenia.

== Sources ==
- Kazembe, J., Makocho, P. & Mailosi, A. 2005. Buccochromis atritaeniatus. 2006 IUCN Red List of Threatened Species. Downloaded on 4 August 2007.
- Maréchal, C., 1991. Buccochromis. p. 29-31. In J. Daget, J.-P. Gosse, G.G. Teugels and D.F.E. Thys van den Audenaerde (eds.) Check-list of the freshwater fishes of Africa (CLOFFA). ISNB, Brussels; MRAC, Tervuren; and ORSTOM, Paris. Vol. 4. (Ref. 5607)
