= MV Songea =

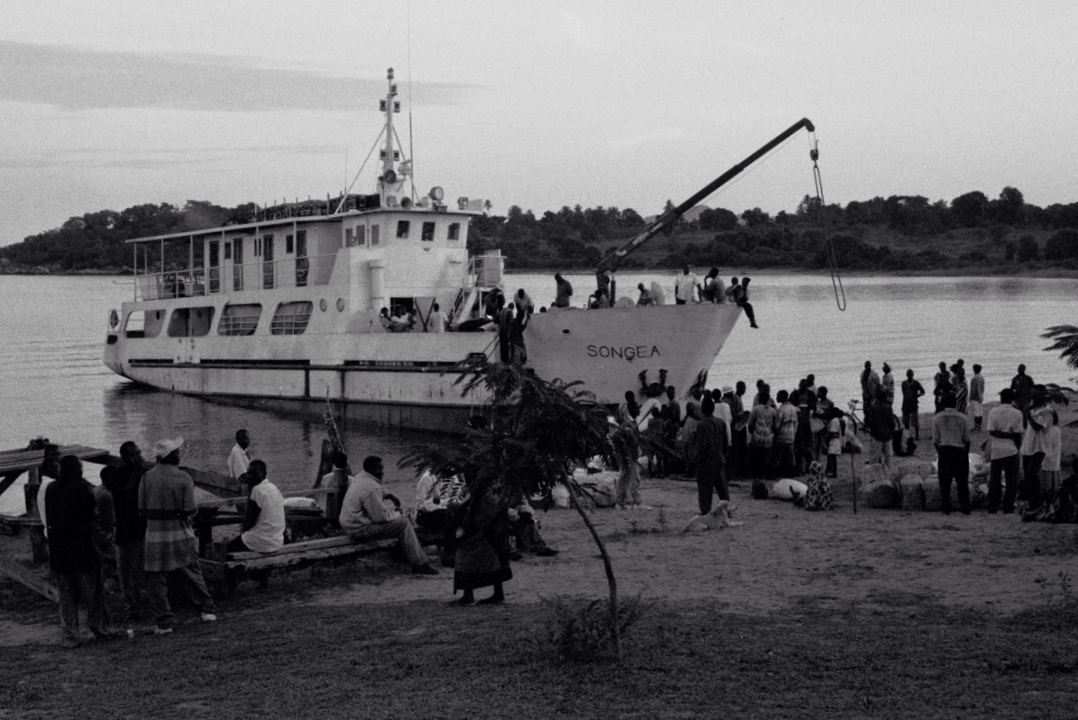
- MV Songea on Lake Nyasa

History
- Name: MV Songea
- Acquired: 1974
- Fate: Transferred to Tanzania

History

Tanzania
- Name: MV Songea
- Operator: Marine Services Company
- Acquired: 1977
- Status: in service

General characteristics
- Type: Ferry
- Speed: 10 knots
- Capacity: 200 passengers; 40 tonne cargo

MV Songea is a ferry operated by the Marine Services Company of Tanzania on Lake Nyasa.

In 2000 the Songea was described as being indefinitely out of service. As of 2024 the Songea was unreliable and often required repair.
