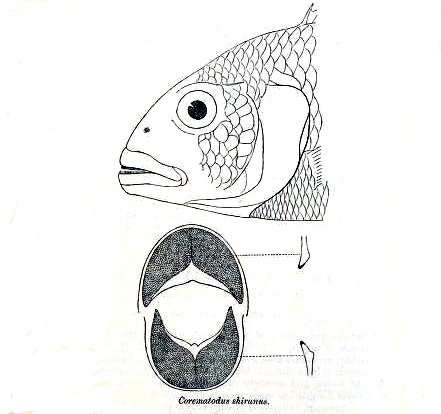

Conservation status
- Critically endangered, possibly extinct (IUCN 3.1)

Scientific classification
- Kingdom: Animalia
- Phylum: Chordata
- Class: Actinopterygii
- Order: Cichliformes
- Family: Cichlidae
- Genus: Corematodus
- Species: C. shiranus

Binomial name
- Corematodus shiranus Boulenger, 1897

= Corematodus shiranus =

Species of fish

Corematodus shiranus is a species of haplochromine cichlid fish native to Lake Malawi, Lake Malombe and the upper reaches of the Shire River in East Africa. It is an aggressive mimic of the chambo cichlids (Nyasalapia, a subgenus of Oreochromis) in both color pattern and swimming mode. It is therefore able to approach unsuspecting schools of these species and rapidly take a mouthful of scales or fin. Due to overfishing, the chambo cichlid populations have drastically declined, adversely affecting C. shiranus, which was last reported in 1997 and might now be extinct.
