= Mtenje =

- Village
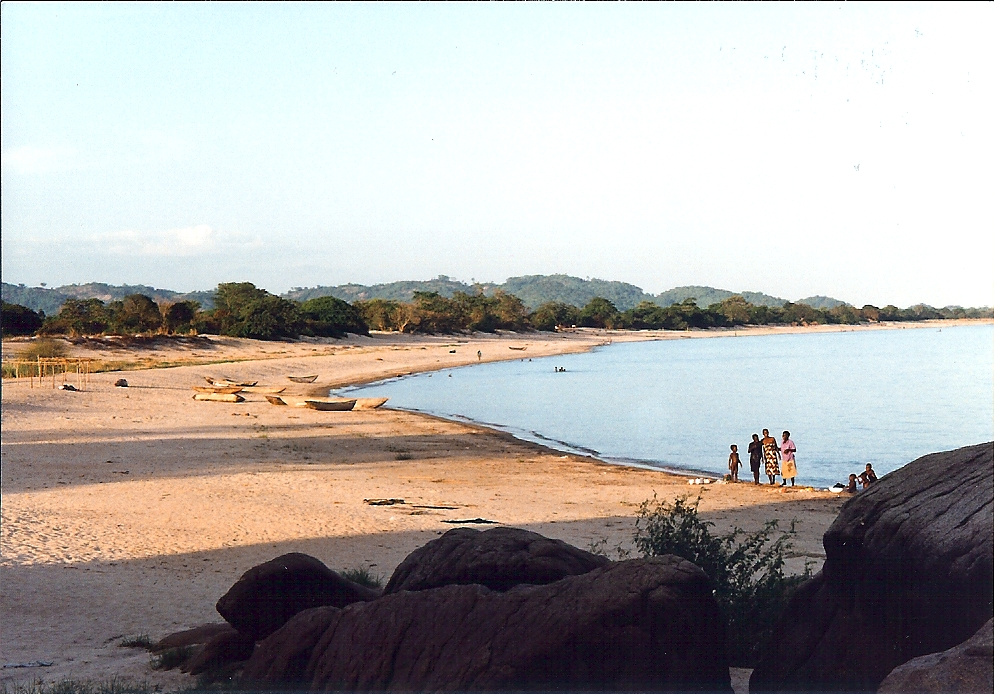
- Mtenje is located only 1 mile (1.6 km) north of Nkhotakota

- Location in Malawi
- Coordinates: 12°56′S 34°18′E
- Country: Malawi
- Region: Central Region
- District: Nkhotakota District

Mtenje is a village in central Malawi near Lake Malawi. It is located in Nkhotakota District in the Central Region approximately 1 mile (1.6 km) north of Nkhotakota.
