= Liuli =

- Town and ward
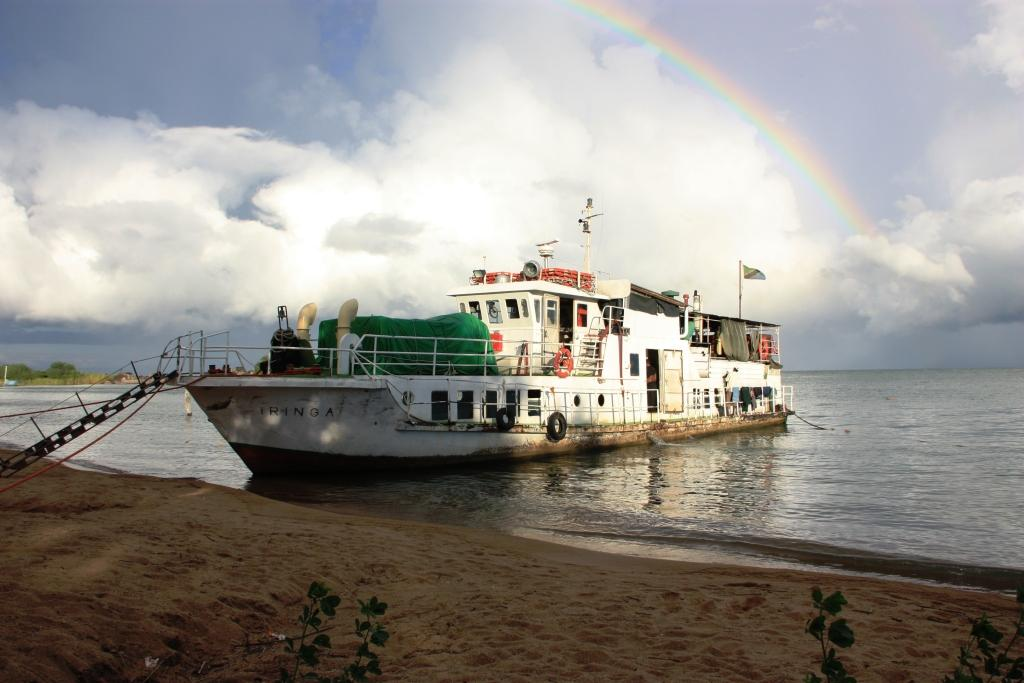
- MV Iringa at Liuli harbour

- Location in Tanzania
- Coordinates: 11°6′0″S 34°38′40″E
- Country: Tanzania
- Region: Ruvuma Region
- District: Mbinga District
- Time zone: UTC+3 (EAT)

Liuli, formerly known as Sphinx Hafen (German: Sphinxhafen), is a settlement on the Tanzanian shore of Lake Malawi in the Mbinga District of Ruvuma province. It is notable for being the site of the first naval action of World War I.

== The sphinx rocks ==
The settlement is distinguished on the lake shore by a sphinx-like series of seven rocks lying offshore. The rocks indicate deep water, leading to its development by the Germans as a ship repair base. The Anglican missionary William Percival Johnson described the rocks as follows:

"Sphinx Hafen rocks, so called by the Germans (the native name is Liuli) is fairly central placed on the east side. If you can see the great rock on the south side of the entrance in the right light you will not ask 'Why is this place called Sphinx?' The harbor is small but good, and here was the first opening skirmish of the Great War on the Lake. The German steamer had been pulled up on a slipway here, and was seized by the British. Nyasa, the great water: being a description of the lake and the life of the People. 1922

== 1914–1918: Sphinxhafen in the war on Lake Nyasa ==
On 13 August 1914, in the first naval action of World War I, the British lake steamer gunboat HMS Gwendolen caught the German armed steamer Hermann von Wissmann on a slipway at Sphinxhafen. The German steamship was named after the explorer Hermann von Wissmann who raised funds for the vessel as an anti-slavery gunboat in 1890. HMS Gwendolen commenced bombarding the German port. The King's African Rifles later attacked Sphinxhafen in May 1915.

== The Liuli mission ==
Liuli was originally, as Sphinxhafen, a German mission. After World War I it became a mission station for the Universities' Mission to Central Africa. William Johnson is buried in the church there and regarded locally as a saint. The mission hospital, founded by the German mission, continues as St. Anne's Hospital, still the major health facility on the eastern lakeshore.

== Liuli today ==
Liuli is today a stop on the lake ferry from Mbamba Bay, up the lakeshore as far as Liuli, and then across to the Malawi side of the lake.
