= Hermann von Wissmann =

Hermann von Wissmann may refer to:

- Hermann Wissmann (1853–1905), German explorer and administrator in Africa
  - Hermann von Wissmann (steamship), a German steamer
- Hermann von Wissmann (geographer) (1895–1979), German-Austrian explorer of Arabia, son of the above
