= SS Gwendolen =

British steamship in service in Africa in early 20th century

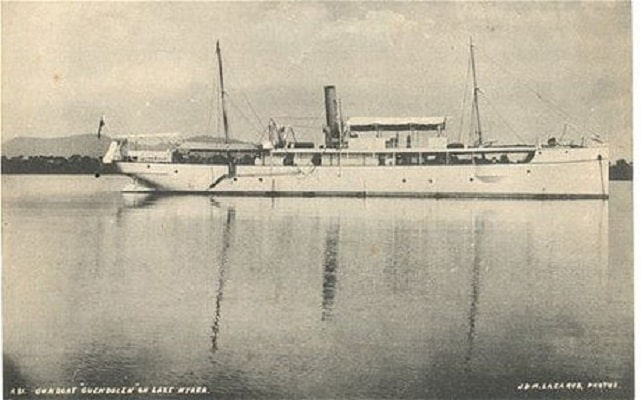

History

Nyasaland
- Name: Gwendolen
- Namesake: Lady Gwendolen Cecil (1860–1945)
- Launched: 1899

General characteristics
- Type: Ferry
- Length: 136 feet (41 m)
- Beam: 24 feet (7.3 m)
- Draught: 5.5 feet (1.7 m)
- Depth: 19 feet (5.8 m)
- Installed power: Steam
- Propulsion: Screw

SS Gwendolen (sometimes misspelled Guendolen and Gwendolyn) was a British steamship on Lake Nyasa that fought in the first naval action of World War I against the German steamship Hermann von Wissman which it caught on a slipway at Sphinxhafen, now known as Liuli.

The 350-ton vessel was launched at Fort Johnston in 1899, and named after Lady Gwendolen Cecil, the then 39-year-old unmarried daughter of the Marquess of Salisbury. In 1907 the Gwendolen was the largest of three vessels formerly used as gunboats, the others being the SS Chauncy Maples and the Queen Victoria, with four civilian steamers on the lake.

From 1914 she was commanded by Captain Edmund Rhoades, who attacked the Hermann von Wissman, the vessel of his friend and former drinking partner Captain Berndt, by surprise, with Berndt having been unaware that war had started. William Percival Johnson later recalled that Captain Berndt, who had been master of the German vessel for its original purpose as an anti-slavery gunboat in the 1890s, had been a good friend of the British missionaries in the days of Chauncy Maples.

In the 1920s the Nyasaland Government Marine Transport ran a monthly sailing of SS Gwendolen from Fort Johnston carrying goods and passengers on a 15-day round trip around various ports on the lake.
