= Hermann von Wissmann (steamship) =

German steamship in Africa in early 20th century

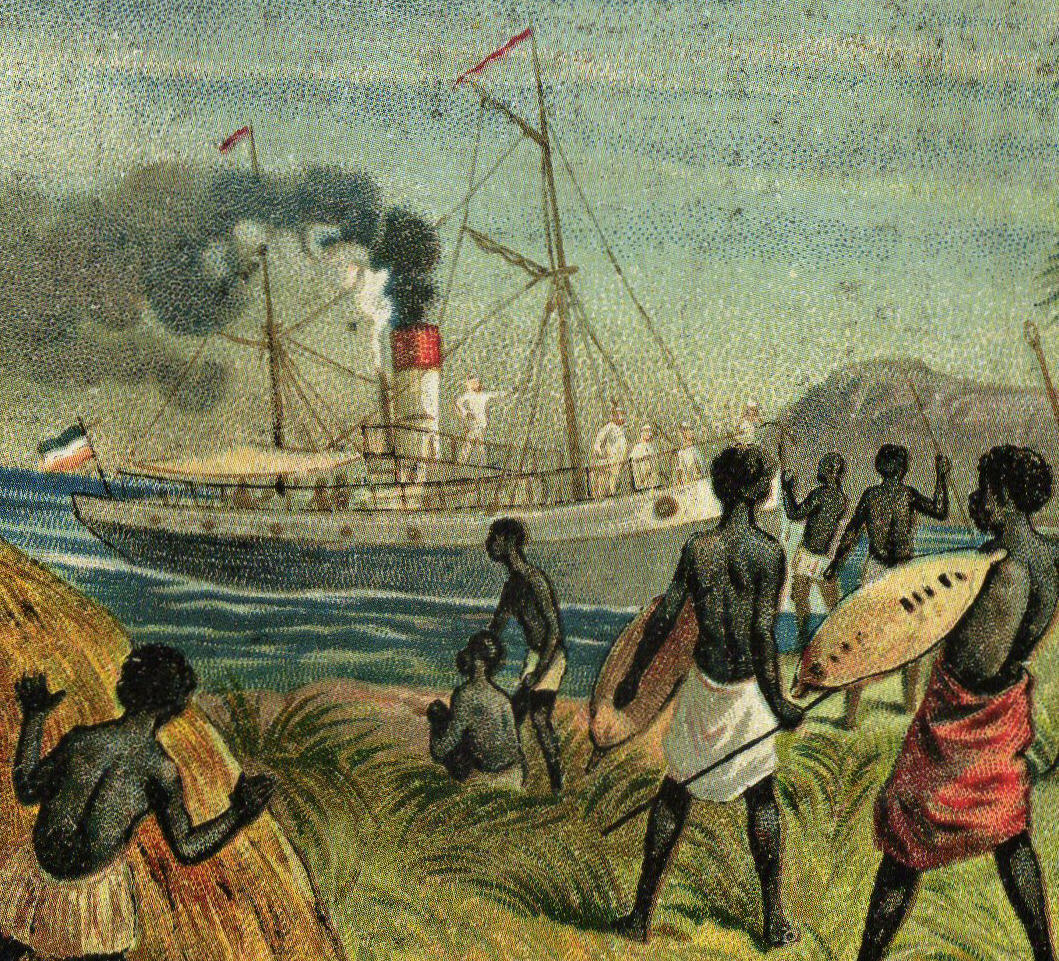
- Hermann von Wissmann in 1910

History

German Empire
- Name: Hermann von Wissmann
- Namesake: Hermann von Wissmann
- Builder: Janssen & Schmilinsky, Hamburg
- Launched: 1890
- In service: 22 September 1893
- Fate: Scrapped, 1950

General characteristics
- Type: Steam ship
- Tonnage: 100 tons
- Length: 26.50 m (86.9 ft)
- Beam: 5.80 m (19.0 ft)
- Draught: 1.25 m (4 ft 1 in)
- Propulsion: 2-cylinder compound steam engine, 60 PS (44 kW), 1 shaft
- Speed: 8 knots (15 km/h; 9.2 mph)
- Crew: 10

Hermann von Wissmann was a German steamer on Lake Nyasa named after the German explorer Hermann von Wissmann who had raised funds for the vessel to be built in 1890 as an anti-slavery gunboat.

== Battle of Lake Nyasa ==
The attack of the British lake-steamer Gwendolen on Hermann von Wissmann while it was on a slipway at Liuli, was the first naval action of World War I. The British disabled the vessel briefly on 13 August 1914, then in 1915 completely put the vessel out of action.

== Hedwig von Wissmann, ==
Hermann von Wissmann had a smaller sister vessel, named after Wissmann's wife, Hedwig von Wissmann, on Lake Tanganyika. This smaller vessel was involved in the exploits of Geoffrey Spicer-Simson which were the basis of The African Queen, a 1935 novel by C. S. Forester and the 1951 film of the same name starring Humphrey Bogart and Katharine Hepburn.

From 1916 to 1920 the boat served as HMS King George, then from 1920 as the cargo steamer Mlonda until it was scrapped in 1950.

== Bibliography ==
Notes

References

- von Lettow-Vorbeck, Paul (November 20, 2023). My Reminiscences Of East Africa. ISBN 9783988269768. - Total pages: 338
