= Lake Malombe =

Lake in Malawi

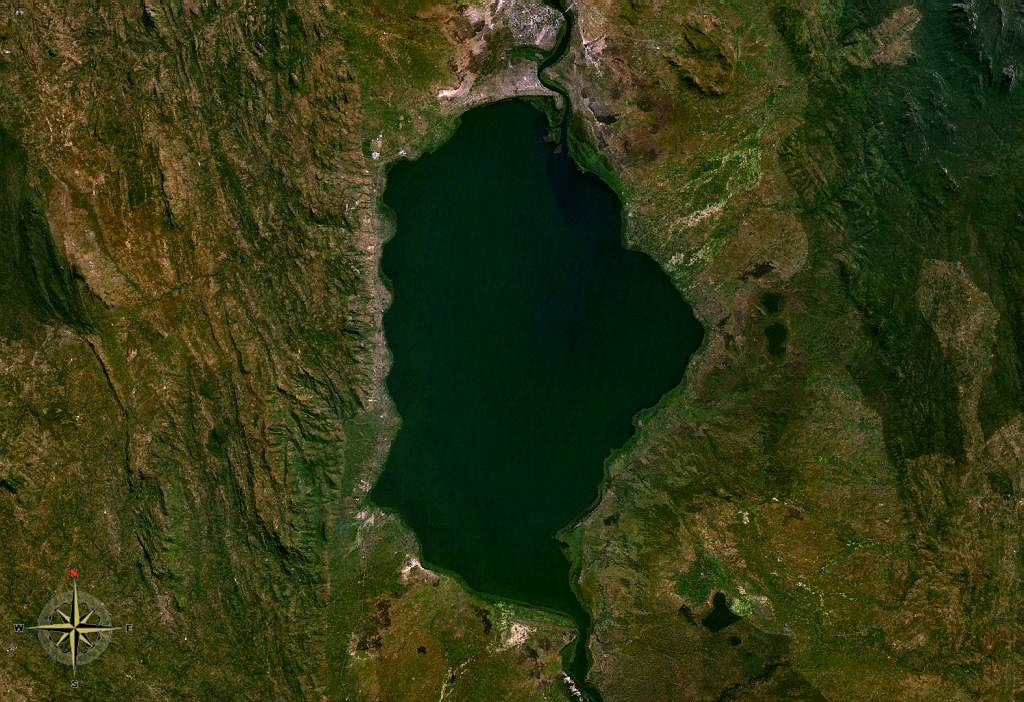
- Seen from space

- Location within Malawi
- Location: Southern Region
- Coordinates: 14°40′0″S 35°15′0″E
- Primary inflows: Shire River from Lake Malawi
- Primary outflows: Shire River
- Basin countries: Malawi
- Surface area: 450 km^{2} (170 sq mi)
- Average depth: 6–8 ft (1.8–2.4 m)

Lake Malombe is a lake in southern Malawi. It is located on the Shire River, in the Southern Region around 14°40′0″S 35°15′0″E, about 20 km (12 mi) south of the much larger Lake Malawi. It has an area of about 450 km^{2} (170 mi^{2}). In recent years the number of fishermen on the lake has risen substantially, and this has led to local decline in some fish species, especially the chambo cichlid, which is an important source of food throughout Malawi. The lake is extremely shallow with an average depth of approximately eight feet, and during periods of dry weather the water level recedes and can even disappear.

The lake-bed was dry for several hundred years until it refilled in the middle of the 19th century.
