= MV Vipya =

Steam ship that capsized in Lake Malawi

History
- Name: Vipya
- Owner: Nyasaland Railway Co.
- Port of registry: (Nyasaland) (Malawi) Monkey Bay
- Route: Monkey Bay - Chilumba
- Builder: A & J Inglis Ltd, Glasgow /Harland and Wolff, Belfast
- Yard number: 1043
- Launched: 1944
- Maiden voyage: 1944
- In service: 1944
- Out of service: 1946
- Fate: Capsized July 30, 1946

General characteristics
- Type: Passenger-cargo ship
- Tonnage: 470 tons
- Length: 43 m (140 ft)
- Installed power: steam
- Propulsion: Petters Standard Design 600 bhp (450 kW)
- Speed: 12 knots (22 km/h; 14 mph)
- Capacity: 315 passengers; 100 tons of freight

MV Vipya (also spelled MV Viphya) was a motor vessel used as a passenger-cargo ship that sailed on Lake Malawi in Nyasaland (present-day Malawi) from 1944 to 1946. The ferry had a tonnage of 470 tons, was 140 feet (43 m) in length, 27 feet (8.2 m) in breadth, and had a twin crew. Equipped with a motor engine, it could travel up to a speed of 12 knots (22 km/h; 14 mph). It was built to carry 315 passengers and 100 tons of cargo. On July 30, 1946, the ship set sail with 194 passengers on board. It was caught up in a storm near Chilumba in Karonga where it capsized and sank. The disaster resulted in 145 passengers and crew on board drowning. No remains of the bodies have been recovered. The sternwheel ferry disaster is the worst shipwreck in Malawi's (then the British Protectorate of Nyasaland) history.

== History ==
In order to cope with increasing lake traffic on Lake Malawi, the Nyasaland Railways Company ordered the MV Viphya to be built in 1942. The ship was built in Scotland by A & J Inglis Ltd, Glasgow, a subsidiary of Irish ship builders Harland and Wolff, as a passenger-cargo ship. The boat was shipped from Scotland in 3018 and 82 cases to Beira, Mozambique in 1943 and then sent by train to Malawi for reassembly. During reassembly, an additional top deck was installed by the owners. This made the ship the largest ship built for service on Lake Malawi (then Lake Nyasa). The ship was named Vipya after the mountainous high terrain area in the northern part of the country. The Vipya's captain was Commander Keith Farguhanson, its second in command was Captain Flint, and First Officer was Mr. Underwood. It was mainly stationed in Fort Johnson (Mangochi.).

It was first launched as a passenger vessel on June 14, 1944, with tonnage exceeding 100 tons. World War II disrupted future voyages until the ship's first scheduled weekly passenger trips resumed on June 26, 1946 with great fanfare. The route of the ship was from Monkey Bay to Mwaya in the north. The ship had sailed three more times prior to capsizing during its fourth voyage. Due to the policies of the colonial administration, the passenger sections were segregated into cabins for Blacks, Whites and Asians.

== Sinking of the Vipya ==
On July 30, 1946, the MV Viphya set off on its fourth voyage from Mbamba Bay northward towards Karonga. When the ship got caught up in a storm, the ship's captain, Farguhanson ordered the crew to continue to their destination despite being warned about the inclement weather conditions. This resulted in a forceful wave hitting the ship and causing the boat to capsize and sink approximately 7 nautical miles (13 km; 8.1 mi) near Florence Bay (Chitimba). Approximately 145 passengers and crew drowned. The majority of the passengers were trapped in the lower decks and drowned. This included all of the mostly European first-class passengers, and 4 male students from Luwazi Mission School. No bodies were recovered. Approximately 49 people survived the disaster. This included approximately 33 African passengers who were on the deck, 2 Luwazi students, as well as 4 crew members who climbed out of the engine room window, floating to land on wreckage. The survivors made it to land Livingstonia's shores. The wreckage is still under Lake Malawi with the exact location still unknown.

=== Passengers ===
Passengers identified that died in the accident include Captain Keith Ferguhanson, Mr and Mrs. Timcke, Mr. R. Duly, Mr & Mrs Healy. Others who perished included students from Blantyre Secondary School and Luwanzi Mission School.

=== Survivor narratives ===
Many accounts and narratives about the shipwreck have risen making it a cultural icon. An account of the trip was highlighted in a segment by the BBC including the narrative of Norton Thindwa, then a student from Blantyre Secondary School. The ship's second in command, R.C. Underwood, was not on the ship that day.

==== Rowland Ngosi story ====
The story of civil servant Rowland Samuel Ngosi has been retold in Malawi as an example of work ethic in the civil service. Notably, it was recounted by Vice-President Saulos Chilima at the Institute of Chartered Accountant in Malawi on September 16, 2021. Ngosi, a government accountant, was on board the ship carrying cash meant for the salaries of civil servants in three districts. When the ship sank, Ngosi swam across to Florence Bay with the bag of money intact, ensuring that every civil servant in Rumphi, Karonga and Chitipa were paid their salaries.

==== Luwazi Mission School students ====
The story of the Luwazi Mission School students has been recounted by retired pastor, Patrick Ziba. Ziba was working as a schoolteacher at a mission school and recalled how four students from the Seventh-day Adventist school were among those that perished on the Viphya. Prior to the trip, 14 students were caught stealing peanuts from a barn at the school in July 1946. Their punishment was to dig an outhouse or face expulsion. All 14 students chose to return to their home village in spite of being advised by Ziba and others to accept the punishment. Six of the students bought tickets and boarded the ship whilst the remaining eight tried to find odd jobs to raise money for the tickets. Four of the six students perished in the wreck whilst two survived.

== Investigation and court ruling ==
An investigation led by Commander Hawke into the accident identified two major causes for the ship sinking. The first and primary reason was due to the decision of the ship's Captain Farguhanson not taking heed of inclement weather warnings from his crew. Some passengers also took notice of the inclement weather. The captain and the crew began disagreeing over concerns about severe weather, but the captain ordered the crew to continue towards their destination. According to the investigation he also ordered the main cargo hatch to be opened prematurely and made other poor decisions. This sentiment was shared by the ship's steward, Bemba Mpali, whose account of the story in a BBC article suggested that the captain may have been under the influence of brandy.

The second reason identified for the accident concerned the craftsmanship of the ship. The court questioned the ship surveyors, engineers, and managers. In a judgment read out by Commander Hawke, he pointed to the design and construction of the ship which faulted the boat's designers and owners. They claimed that the ship builders did not make sure that hatches and companion ways were watertight. Some crew members and passengers also questioned the seaworthiness of the ship. Some claimed it was too heavy on top, others claimed that the wood was not suitable for the lake.

=== Court inquiry and annulment ===
The captain's family and Nyasaland Railway Company contested these findings in court through an appeal. Due to unknown reasons, the surviving African crew members' account changed soon after, compelling the court to annul the original results of the investigation. Therefore, Commander Furghanson was cleared of the charges of negligent seamanship in the East African Court of appeals. To date, there is no official explanation as to why the brand-new ship sank. Since then, many accounts and narratives about the causes of the shipwreck have risen, making it a cultural icon.

== Vipya sinking memorials ==
- A sign in Mangochi along the Shire River managed by the Malawi Department of Antiquities in Mangochi (formerly Fort Johnston) memorializes the event.
- A national monument, the Queen Victoria Clock tower in Mangochi, was dedicated to the 145 deceased passengers and crew.
- The Lifbouy Relic from the ship has been preserved at the Karonga Museum gallery.

== References in pop culture ==
Many accounts and narratives about the shipwreck have risen.

- "The Vipya Poem" (poem) - A long poem by Steve Chimombo about the MV Vipya being built, launched, and sailing until it sinks at Florence Bay (Chitimba).
- 1996: "The Vipya Disaster" BBC African Perspective (radio documentary) - Interviews with survivors and experts on the MV Vipya, including Norton Thindwa, Steve Chimombo, September 13, 1996
- 2000: Wrath of Napolo (novel) - A historical novel by Steve Chimombo about a sinking ship on the lake, loosely based on the MV Vipya ship sinking.
