= Cape Maclear =

Cape Maclear Chembe
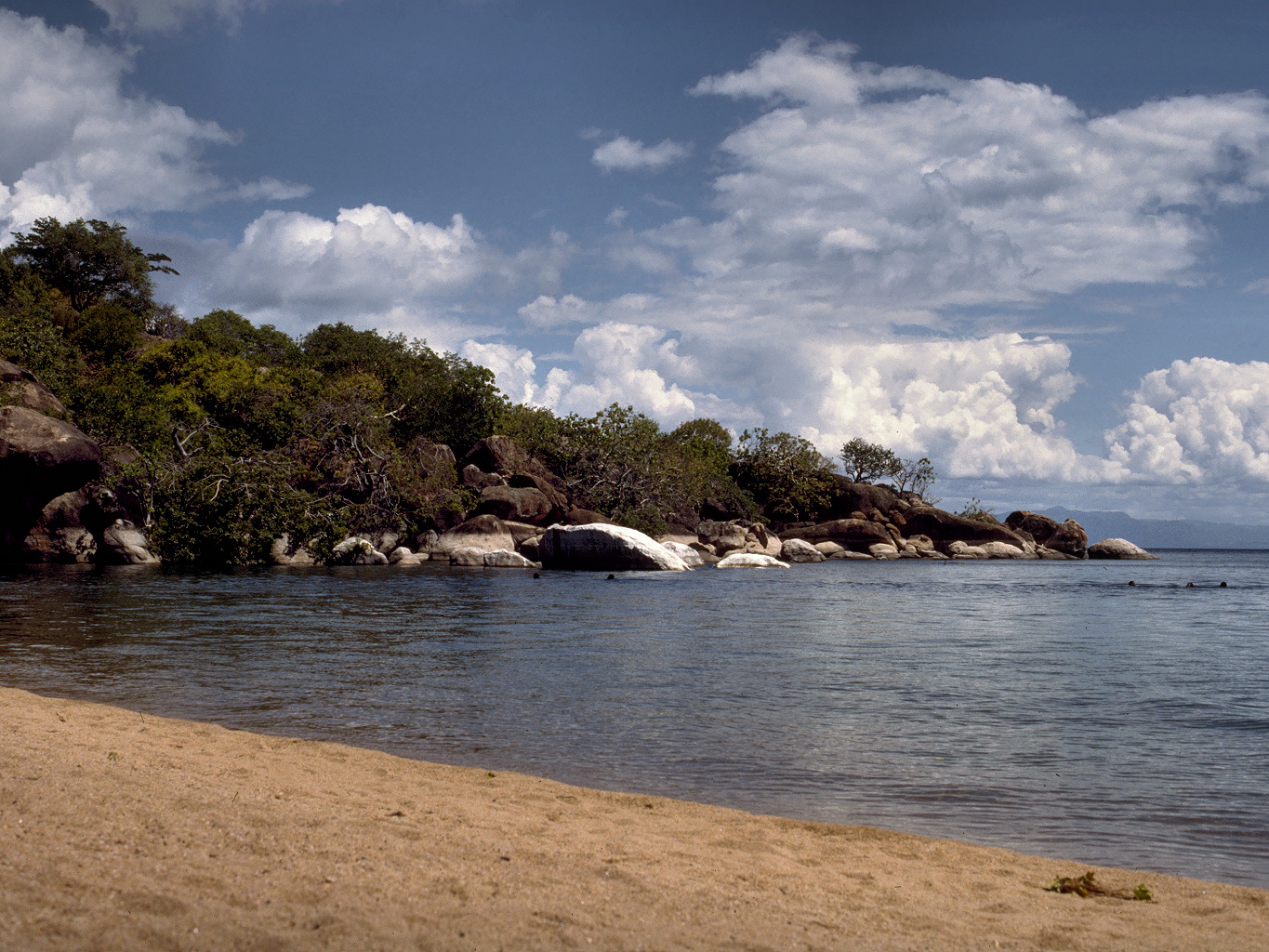
- Otter Point, Cape Maclear
- Nickname: The Cape
- Location in Malawi
- Coordinates: 14°01′S 34°51′E
- Country: Malawi
- Region: Southern Region
- District: Mangochi District
- Time zone: +2
- Climate: Aw

Cape Maclear or Chembe is a town in the Mangochi District of Malawi's Southern Region. The town, on the Nankumba Peninsula, is on the southern shore of Lake Malawi and is the busiest resort on Lake Malawi. Cape Maclear is close to the islands of Domwe, Thumbwe and Mumbo Island on Lake Malawi, and is in Lake Malawi National Park.

== History ==
In 1859, the missionary and explorer David Livingstone uncovered the Cape, and named it "Cape Maclear" after his friend, the astronomer Thomas Maclear, who was Her Majesty's Astronomer at the Cape of Good Hope. In October 1875, a new mission, "Livingstonia", was set up by a group of members of the Free Church of Scotland. Before the missionaries arrived, the area was controlled by the Muslim Yao people. The graves of some of the missionaries are in Cape Maclear, overlooking the bay. Although Cape Maclear had a good harbour, the poor soil in the area, and the prevalence of the tsetse fly, meant a more suitable base had to be found; the mission moved to Bandawe, near Chintheche, in 1882.

== Wildlife ==
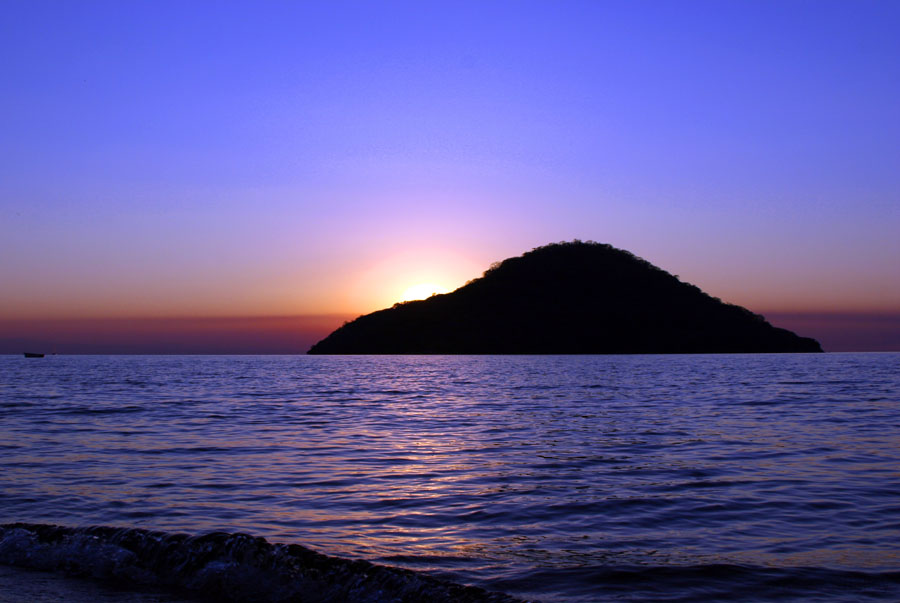
Looking towards Thumbi Island

Cape Maclear and its islands, forests and bay were declared a national park in 1980, creating the Lake Malawi National Park, the first freshwater national park in the world. In 1984, the area became a UNESCO World Heritage Site. There are several species of bird at Cape Maclear, including kingfishers, Dickinson's kestrels, and freckled nightjars. There is a museum about the formation of Lake Malawi and its wildlife at Cape Maclear. UNESCO has recommended wildlife preservation at Cape Maclear.

== Tourism ==
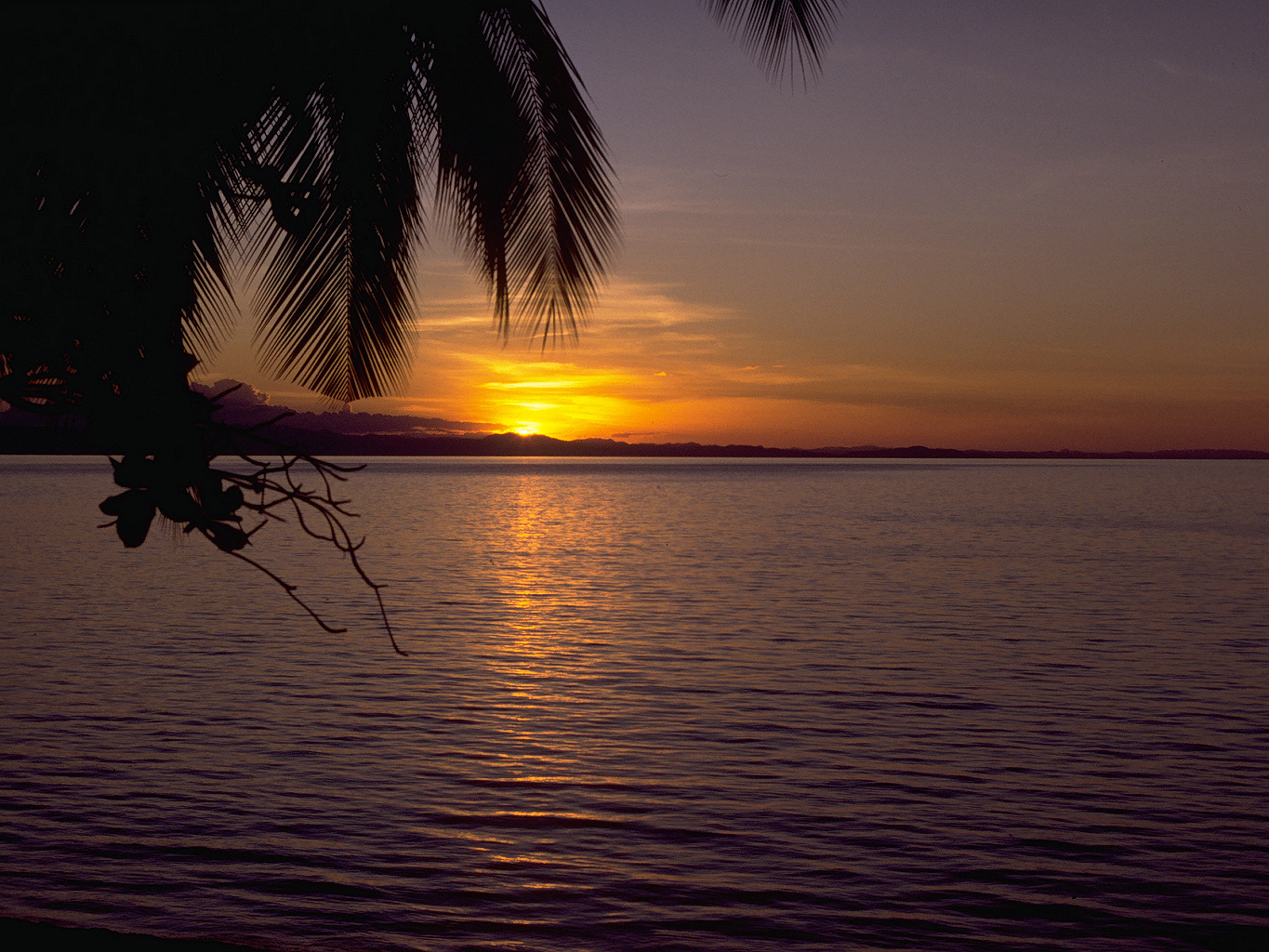
Lake Malawi at Cape Maclear

Cape Maclear is "a leading tourist destination", and is the busiest resort on Lake Malawi. The area is popular with backpackers. There are bars, restaurants, lodges and guesthouses in the town. Activities available in Cape Maclear include snorkelling, hiking, boat cruises, kayaking, and diving. In October 2001, the Malawian government invited investors to fund a $6,000,000 construction of a new 150-room, four-star hotel at Cape Maclear. In June 2003, plans were announced to build an ecolodge on Maleri Island, near Cape Maclear. In February 2005, the Malawian government announced plans to increase ecotourism at Cape Maclear with new accommodation and facilities. These plans proved too ambitious for the fragile Malawian economy and tourist industry.

== Transport ==
In February 2006, the Malawian government announced plans to build a new road from Cape Maclear to Monkey Bay. The current road is a bumpy dirt track, and there is no regular public transport at Cape Maclear. Regular bus service extends only from Lilongwe to Monkey Bay where private minibuses can be hired for the trip to Cape Maclear.

== Healthcare ==
The Billy Riordan Memorial Clinic was established here in 2004 to treat diseases such as dysentery, bilharzia and malaria. There are no diagnostic services or surgery carried out at the clinic. Mags Riordan founded the clinic, she is the mother of a man who drowned in Lake Malawi, near Cape Maclear in 1999. The clinic is supported by the Billy Malawi Project.

Bilharzia is common at Cape Maclear; the incidence of the disease at Cape Maclear was three times higher than the rest of Lake Malawi in 2008.

== Sport ==
Every summer, a multi-day yacht race is held on Lake Malawi. The race starts at Cape Maclear, heads north, and ends at Nkhata Bay.
