= Chisumulu pearl =

Conservation status
- Least Concern (IUCN 3.1)

Scientific classification
- Kingdom: Animalia
- Phylum: Chordata
- Class: Actinopterygii
- Order: Cichliformes
- Family: Cichlidae
- Genus: Labidochromis
- Species: L. flavigulis

Binomial name
- Labidochromis flavigulis D. S. C. Lewis, 1982

Species of fish

The Chisumulu pearl (Labidochromis flavigulis) is a species of cichlid endemic to Lake Malawi where it is only known to occur in areas with rocky substrates around Likoma Island and Chisumulu Island. This species can reach a length of 6.8 centimetres (2.7 in) SL. It can also be found in the aquarium trade.
