= MV Chambo =

Malawi passenger ship

History
- Name: Chambo
- Operator: Malawi Shipping Company
- Port of registry: (Malawi) Nkhata Bay
- Route: Nkhata Bay -Matengula
- Builder: Damen
- Status: in service

General characteristics
- Length: 32 m (105 ft 0 in)
- Beam: 7 m (23 ft 0 in)
- Installed power: 2 × Caterpillar C32 TTA diesel engines
- Propulsion: screw
- Speed: 22 knots (41 km/h; 25 mph)
- Capacity: 100 passengers; 10 tons cargo

MV Chambo is a passenger ship operating on Lake Malawi. It is named after the local name for cichlids living in the lake, Chambo. Because MV Ilala is out of service regularly for maintenance, Chambo was acquired in 2013 to assure uninterrupted service between the Malawian side of the lake, the Mozambican shore and Likoma Island. Vehicles can board the ship using the mount at the front of vessel.

The vessel was withdrawn during the COVID-19 pandemic as border restrictions were applied. The ship rejoined service in 2024 proving additional capacity for passengers on the lake.
