= MV Mtendere =

History
- Name: Mtendere
- Operator: Malawi Shipping Company
- Port of registry: (Nyasaland) (Malawi) Monkey Bay
- Route: Monkey Bay - Chilumba
- Status: out of service, stored in Monkey Bay

General characteristics
- Installed power: diesel
- Propulsion: screw

MV Mtendere (Chichewa for 'peace') is a ferry, which used to serve passenger and cargo service on Lake Malawi. As of 2014 it was out of service and stored at the port of Monkey Bay with plans to break it up and recycle its parts.

== See also ==
- Transport in Malawi
