= Labidochromis freibergi =

Conservation status
- Least Concern (IUCN 3.1)

Scientific classification
- Kingdom: Animalia
- Phylum: Chordata
- Class: Actinopterygii
- Order: Cichliformes
- Family: Cichlidae
- Genus: Labidochromis
- Species: L. freibergi

Binomial name
- Labidochromis freibergi D. S. Johnson, 1974

Species of fish

Labidochromis freibergi is a species of cichlid endemic to Lake Malawi where it is only known to occur around Likoma Island in areas with rocky substrates. This species grows to a length of 8 centimetres (3.1 in) TL. The specific name of this species honours the American fish importer Jacob Freiberg.
