= Labidochromis chisumulae =

Conservation status
- Least Concern (IUCN 3.1)

Scientific classification
- Kingdom: Animalia
- Phylum: Chordata
- Class: Actinopterygii
- Order: Cichliformes
- Family: Cichlidae
- Genus: Labidochromis
- Species: L. chisumulae

Binomial name
- Labidochromis chisumulae Lewis, 1987

Species of fish

Labidochromis chisumulae is a species of fish in the family Cichlidae. It is endemic to Chizumulu Island, Malawi. Its natural habitat is freshwater lakes.
