= Nkhata Bay =

Nkhata Bay Nkhata
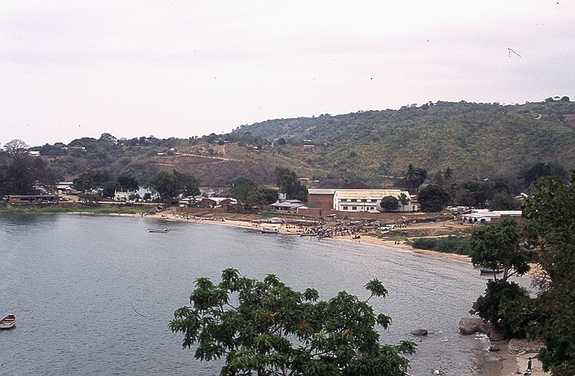
- The town sits on the flat between the hills and Lake Malawi

- Location in Malawi
- Coordinates: 11°36′00″S 34°18′00″E
- Country: Malawi
- Region: Northern Region
- District: Nkhata Bay District
- Elevation: 1,545 ft (471 m)

Population (2018 Census)
  - Total: 14,274
- Time zone: +2
- Climate: Aw

Nkhata Bay (or simply Nkhata) is the capital of the Nkhata Bay District in Malawi. It is on the shore of Lake Malawi (formerly Lake Nyasa), 40 km east of Mzuzu, and is one of the main ports on Lake Malawi. The population of Nkhata Bay was 14,274 according to the 2018 census.

== Demographics ==
Year	Population
1987	6,494
1998	9,433
2008	11,269
2018	14,274

=== Language ===
Tumbuka is the most spoken common language, followed by other languages in the town of Nkhata. In homes, Tonga and Tumbuka are used. Historically, the Tongas of the Nkhata-Bay District, are part of the Tumbuka group. Glotolog categorizes Tonga and Tumbuka in a single group.

== Economy ==
Nkhata Bay is dependent on fish. Farming, especially cassava, is the main occupation in the area. Rubber, macadamia, sugar and rice plantations also exist around Nkhata Bay Town. In May 2008, the Lweya irrigation scheme in Nkhata Bay was "rehabilitated".

Income from tourism is a major source of income to the Nkhata Bay community.

=== Damage to crops ===
In April 2002, over 1,000 hectares (2,500 acres) of "corn, rice, nuts and cassava" were washed away at Nkhata Bay after heavy rain, causing a worsening of food shortages. In March 2006, Nkhata Bay received over 300 bags of maize from the Feed the Nation Fund, because the area was suffering from food shortages. There were heavy rains in April 2006, causing further damage to Nkhata Bay. Malawi's former minister of agriculture, Uladi Mussa Monday, stated in May 2008 that due to heavy rain and flooding, crops in Nkhata Bay had washed away; he said this would cause an "acute food shortage".

== Climate ==
Climate data for Nkhata Bay, Malawi (1961–1990)
Month	Jan	Feb	Mar	Apr	May	Jun	Jul	Aug	Sep	Oct	Nov	Dec	Year
Mean daily maximum °C (°F)	28.8 (83.8)	28.9 (84.0)	28.8 (83.8)	28.6 (83.5)	27.3 (81.1)	25.8 (78.4)	25.5 (77.9)	26.6 (79.9)	28.7 (83.7)	30.2 (86.4)	30.4 (86.7)	29.2 (84.6)	28.2 (82.8)
Daily mean °C (°F)	24.7 (76.5)	24.7 (76.5)	24.4 (75.9)	23.9 (75.0)	22.1 (71.8)	20.3 (68.5)	19.9 (67.8)	20.8 (69.4)	22.8 (73.0)	24.7 (76.5)	25.6 (78.1)	24.9 (76.8)	23.2 (73.8)
Mean daily minimum °C (°F)	21.1 (70.0)	21.1 (70.0)	20.8 (69.4)	20.0 (68.0)	17.9 (64.2)	15.7 (60.3)	15.2 (59.4)	15.6 (60.1)	17.4 (63.3)	19.8 (67.6)	21.2 (70.2)	21.3 (70.3)	18.9 (66.0)
Average precipitation mm (inches)	224.2 (8.83)	200.7 (7.90)	358.0 (14.09)	283.0 (11.14)	134.0 (5.28)	37.2 (1.46)	32.5 (1.28)	5.2 (0.20)	3.2 (0.13)	14.0 (0.55)	118.0 (4.65)	247.0 (9.72)	1,657 (65.24)
Average precipitation days (≥ 0.3 mm)	19	17	20	18	10	5	4	2	1	2	8	17	123
Average relative humidity (%)	84	84	85	84	81	78	75	72	69	68	75	81	78
Mean monthly sunshine hours	170.5	159.6	195.3	192.0	238.7	237.0	254.2	288.3	300.0	313.1	264.0	201.5	2,814.2
Mean daily sunshine hours	5.5	5.7	6.3	6.4	7.7	7.9	8.2	9.3	10.0	10.1	8.8	6.5	7.7
Source: NOAA

== Transport ==
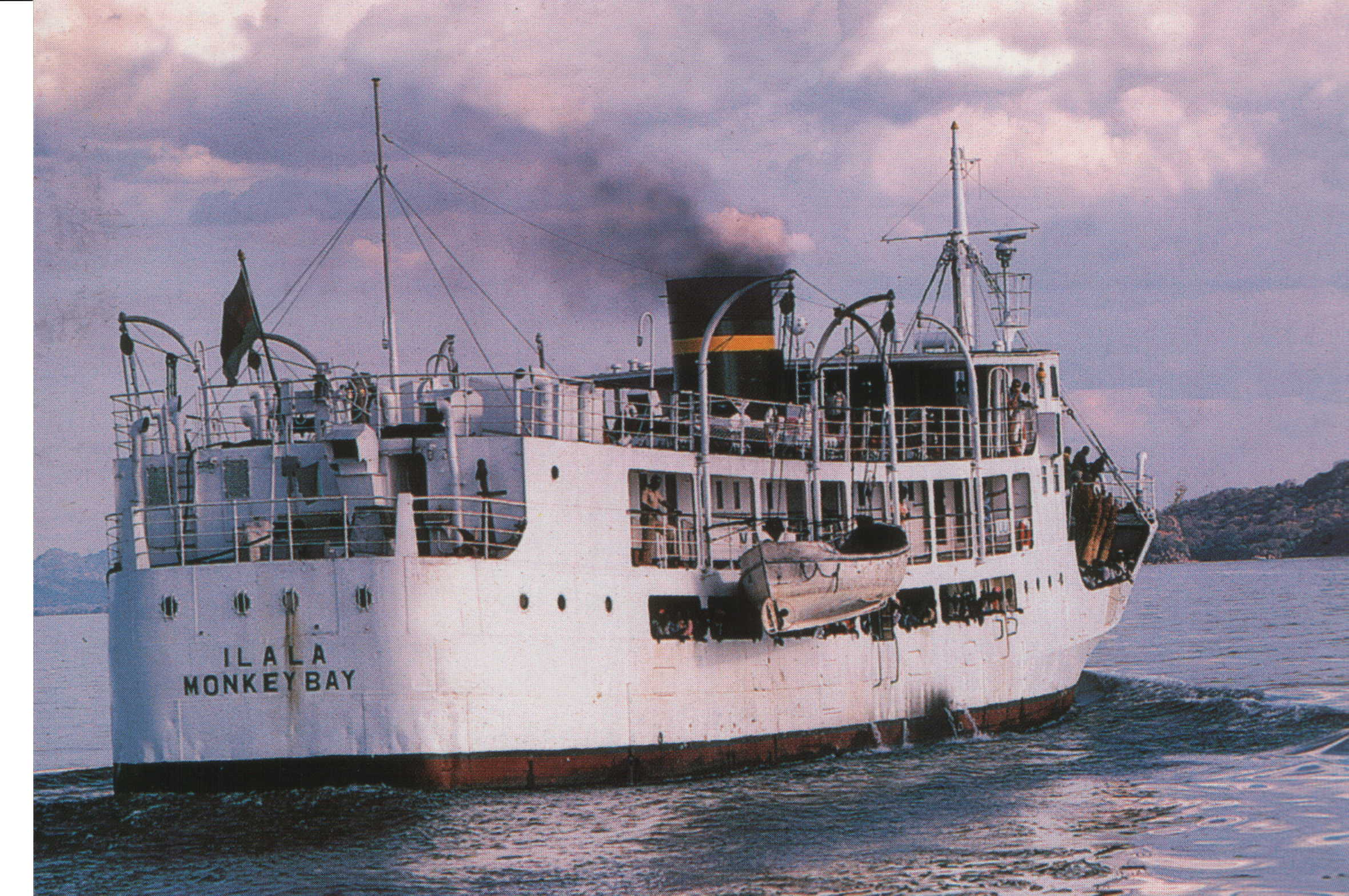
MV Ilala leaves Nkhata Bay

Nkhata Bay is a port visited by the MV Ilala steamship, a boat which travels up Lake Malawi from Monkey Bay in southern Malawi, to Chilumba in the north, via Likoma Island and Chizumulu. In July 2006, plans were announced to "rehabilitate" Nkhata Bay port, and to re-establish a ferry service between Nkhata Bay and Mbamba Bay in Tanzania. This route is currently serviced by motorised dhow. There are regular minibuses that travel from Nkhata Bay to Mzuzu, Nkhotakota and Salima. Express buses travel to Blantyre, Mzuzu and Karonga that depart from the police road block, 3 km from the town.

In June 2008, it was announced that the African Development Bank (ADB) would fund the reconstruction of the road from Nkhata Bay to Mzuzu, but on 20 June 2008, it is said that the ADB will partly fund the reconstruction.

== Sport ==
Nkhata Bay's local football team are the Nkhata Bay Police; the team were renamed to Eagle Strikers and now play in Mzuzu. The team play in the TNM Super League. There is a ladies' football team in Nkhata Bay, and are called the Nkhata Bay United Sisters of Malawi. The club was founded in 2003. Netball is also played in Nkhata Bay. In June 2008, the champions of Nkhata Bay were Kawalazi, and received a prize of 30,000 Malawian Kwacha.

Each summer there is a multi-day yacht race which starts at Cape Maclear in the south, and ends at Nkhata Bay.

== Politics ==
The Member of the Malawian Parliament for Nkhata Bay North in 2008 was Ephraim Mganda Chiume. The MP for Nkhata Bay Central in 2006 was Symon Vuwa Kaunda. The MP for Nkhata Bay South West in 2008 was Silvester Kasambara, a member of the opposition. Kasambara caused a storm in Parliament in June 2008 when he pledged 10,000 Malawian kwacha to the Malawi national football team, after their 1–0 victory against Egypt, the African champions, in a FIFA World Cup 2010 qualifier.

The MP for Nkhata Bay North in 2024 was Chrissie Kanyasho.

== Facilities ==
=== Amenities ===
There are bars, restaurants, two grocery stores, a bus station, tailor shops, a taxi rank and a market in Nkhata Bay. There are four banks, NBS, FNB, Malawi Savings and Opportunity Bank, as of early 2013 the automated teller machine will allow withdrawals using most foreign credit or debit cards in the two banks on the top of the hill, NBS and FNB. There is internet access in a few internet cafes, Nkhata Bay Communications Center, Jessie's and others. And free access to internet at Butterfly lodge in South Bay. There are public telephones. The District offices are in town and there is a post office. You can pay your ESCOM bill in town, and Water Board bill at the top of the hill.

=== Law and order ===
Nkhata Bay has a police station. Robberies of tourists have occurred at Nkhata Bay, but are rare.

=== Medical ===
There is a hospital in Nkhata Bay, and in October 2006 it received a donation from the National Bank of Malawi. AllAfrica have reported that parts of the Nkhata Bay area are not receiving appropriate AIDS treatment.

== Tourism ==
Nkhata Bay is described by Lonely Planet as "Caribbeanesque" and a "lush tropical indent". There are several guesthouses and lodges for tourists in Nkhata Bay. In February 2005, the Malawian government announced plans to build ecolodges as a way of increasing ecotourism in the Nkhata Bay area. The diving school in Nkhata Bay offers the "cheapest diving course in the world" according to The Daily Telegraph. Nkhata Bay tourism has a long history. It has been part of the overland backpackers route between east Africa and cape town but the number of backpackers have dropped considerably in recent years. Political issues in Zimbabwe has revised the overland backpacking route so that many people now go through Zambia or the Mozambique coast. The Heart Hotel was a local owned establishment in the local village where very low budget backpackers could get a room and breakfast for well under one US dollar. Nkhata Bay became a place where people could rest on a long trip and spend very little money. With the opening of Njajay Lodge the scene changed a little. The town along with backpackers culture shifted to catering to a traveller with more money to spend. While the village now has many places to stay the problem has become attracting people who now often travel through other countries or easier accessed beaches in Malawi. Another shift that has reduced the amount of foreign visitors to Nkhata Bay is the increasing number of people travelling Africa by overland truck rather than independent backpackers travel. Overland trucks do not come to Nkhata Bay but instead, choose the beaches on Chinteche to the south. As a result, many of the local artists have moved their craft stalls to the Nkhata Bay/Chinteche road junction. This along with huge increases in international parcel rates from Malawi have made it increasingly difficult for the talented local artist to make a living. Many artists now set up stalls directly outside of overland truck camps around Malawi understanding that backpackers can no longer afford to send famous Malawi chief chairs and masks home.

== Notable events ==
=== Marriage ===
In March 2000, 73-year-old man from Nkhata and a 22-year-old woman married, in what BBC News reported as "Malawi's surprise wedding of the year"

=== Crocodile attack ===
In December 2002, a businessman, Mac Bosco Chawinga, was dragged in to Lake Malawi at Nkhata Bay by a crocodile; Chawinga managed to escape by biting the crocodile on the nose. The crocodile then released him, and Chawinga managed to return to the shore, although he had received severe injuries to his legs and arms. The Times reported that, according to "wildlife experts", Chawinga is the first person to survive after "using such an audacious tactic".

=== Capsized boat ===
On 9 May 2004, the then-Tourism, Parks and Wildlife Minister Wallace Chiume survived when a boat capsized in Nkhata Bay. At least six other people drowned in the accident. One of the dead passengers was a child. The boat was being used for campaigning in the Malawian election. Strong winds were blamed for the accident which happened 10 kilometres (6.2 mi) from the shore of Lake Malawi. 40 people were on the boat at the time.

=== Organizations ===
In 2006, the Nkhata Bay AIDS Support Organization was created in Malawi and later registered in the state of Wisconsin as a non-profit corporation. The American-Malawian partnership has led to great success in the fight against HIV/AIDS in the Nkhata Bay District. Over six outreach clinics were established in the past two years, leading to a 23% drop in positive HIV testing results. The charity operates on a small budget coming from local Wisconsin donors.
