= Labidochromis zebroides =

Conservation status
- Endangered (IUCN 3.1)

Scientific classification
- Kingdom: Animalia
- Phylum: Chordata
- Class: Actinopterygii
- Order: Cichliformes
- Family: Cichlidae
- Genus: Labidochromis
- Species: L. zebroides

Binomial name
- Labidochromis zebroides D. S. C. Lewis, 1982

Species of fish

Labidochromis zebroides is a species of cichlid endemic to Lake Malawi where it is only known to occur in areas with rocky substrates around Likoma Island and Mazimbwe Island. This species can reach a length of 8.5 centimetres (3.3 in) TL. It can also be found in the aquarium trade.
