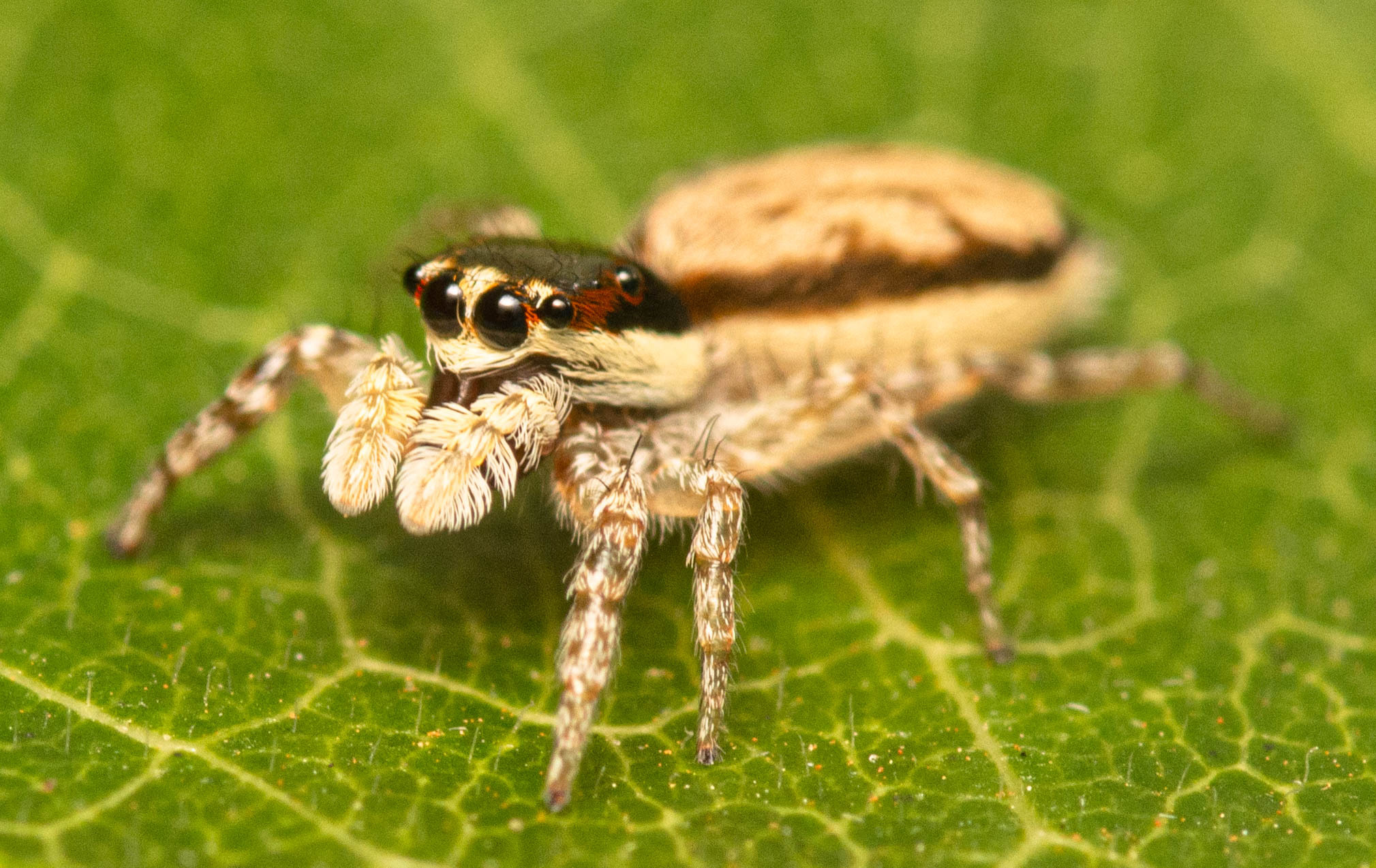

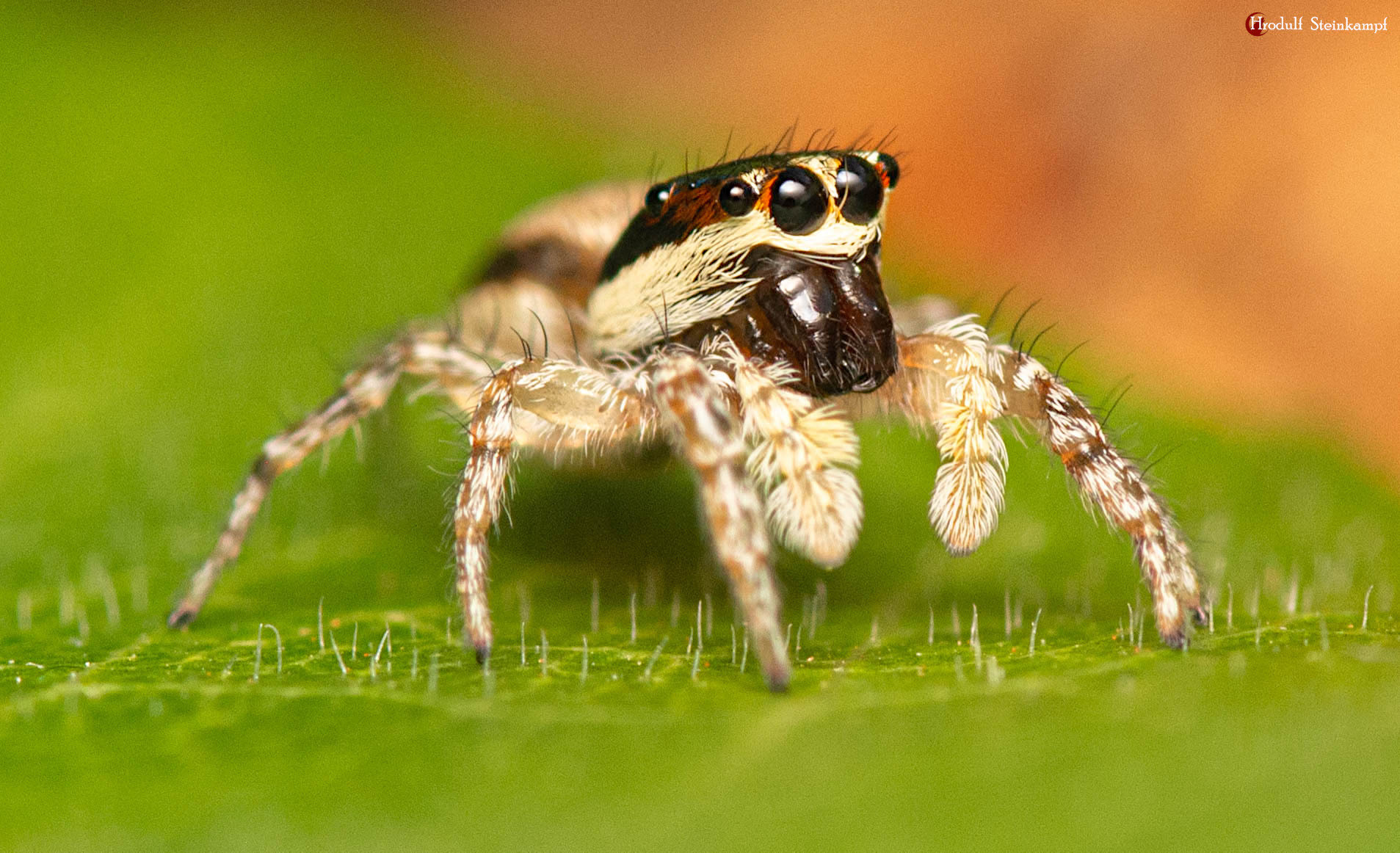
- Mature Menemerus minshullae from South Africa

Scientific classification
- Kingdom: Animalia
- Phylum: Arthropoda
- Subphylum: Chelicerata
- Class: Arachnida
- Order: Araneae
- Infraorder: Araneomorphae
- Family: Salticidae
- Genus: Menemerus
- Species: M. minshullae

Binomial name
- Menemerus minshullae Wesołowska, 1999

= Menemerus minshullae =

Species of jumping spider

Menemerus minshullae is a species of jumping spider that lives in South Africa, Malawi and Zimbabwe. A member of the genus Menemerus, it lives on Vachellia xanthophloea trees, using its flattened shape to hide under flakes of bark. It is a small- to medium-sized spider with a forward section, or cephalothorax, that is between 1.9 and 2.2 millimetres (0.075 and 0.087 in) long and, behind that, an abdomen between 2.1 and 3.3 millimetres (0.083 and 0.130 in) long. Its female is larger than the male and lighter in colour, with a dark brown rather than black carapace and lighter brown abdomen. Both have an abdomen that has a large, leaf-shaped, pattern. Its copulatory organs distinguish the species from others in the genus. The male has a very short embolus with a larger accompanying conductor. The female epigyne, the external visible part of its copulatory organs, has two pockets that have strongly sclerotized edges. The species was first described in 1999 by Wanda Wesołowska, one of over 500 descriptions she has completed during her lifetime. She originally identified the male as a different species, named Menemerus manicus, but merged the two in 2007.

== Taxonomy and etymology ==
Menemerus minshullae is a species of jumping spider, a member of the family Salticidae, that was first described by the Polish arachnologist Wanda Wesołowska in 1999. She described two species, one named Menemerus minshullae and the other Menemerus manicus, but further discoveries led to the realisation that the two were simply the female and male respectively of the same species. In consequence, the two were combined under the current name. It is one of over 500 species identified by during her career, making her one of the most prolific in the field. She allocated the spider to the genus Menemerus. The genus was first described in 1868 by the French arachnologist Eugène Simon and contains over 60 species.

Menemerus shares some characteristics with the genera Hypaeus and Pellenes. Genetic analysis has shown that the genus is related to the genera Helvetia and Phintella. The genus was placed in the tribe Heliophaninae until that was reconstituted as Chrysillini by Canadian scientist Wayne Maddison in 2015. The tribe is ubiquitous across most of the continents of the world. It is allocated to the subclade Saltafresia in the clade Salticoida. In 2016, Polish arachnologist Jerzy Prószyński created a group of genera named Menemerines after the genus. The vast majority of the species in Menemerines are members of the genus Menemerus, with additional examples from Kima and Leptorchestes.

The spider's generic name derives from two Greek words, meaning certainly and diurnal. The species is named in honour of Jacqui Minshull, a curator of spiders at the Natural History Museum of Zimbabwe. The female holotype is stored in the Museum of Comparative Zoology in Cambridge, Massachusetts, and the male holotype is stored in the Natural History Museum of Zimbabwe in Bulawayo. The male formed part of a collection by George and Elizabeth Peckham.

== Description ==
Menemerus minshullae is a small- to medium-sized spider. The male has a forward section, or cephalothorax, that is between 1.9 and 2.1 millimetres (0.075 and 0.083 in) long while the female cephalothorax is between 2.0 and 2.2 millimetres (0.079 and 0.087 in) long. In both the sexes, it is between 1.5 and 1.6 millimetres (0.059 and 0.063 in) wide. The female has a dark brown carapace, the hard upper side of its cephalothorax, that is between 1.6 and 2.1 millimetres (0.063 and 0.083 in) long and between 1.4 and 1.6 millimetres (0.055 and 0.063 in) wide with white stripes formed of hairs on its edges. In some examples, there are four white patches on the thorax. Its eye field is black, sometime with a metallic sheen, with occasional white hairs amongst the long brown hairs and brown bristles. Its sternum, or underside of the cephalothorax, is dark brown. The part of the spider's face known as its clypeus is low and also has white hairs. Its mouthparts, including its chelicerae and labium, are mainly dark brown; its maxilae are lighter, with white tips.

The female has a brownish or light brown abdomen that is between 2.1 and 3.3 millimetres (0.083 and 0.130 in) in length and between 1.5 and 2.4 millimetres (0.059 and 0.094 in) in width. It has a large, leaf-shaped, lighter patch covering much of the topside and a pale underside that, in some specimens, has a wide stripe down the middle. The spider has greyish-yellow spinnerets used to spin webs. Its front legs are sometimes light brown, the remainder being yellow, with thin brown hairs and spines visible on all of them. Its epigyne, the external and most visible of its copulatory organs, is oval and strongly sclerotized with a single large pocket and two oval depressions visible on its surface. It has two copulatory openings that lead to simple insemination ducts with clear accessory glands and small spermathecae, or receptacles.

The male's carapace is low and black with white lines formed of hairs on the edges. There is a light patch on the head that blends into a streak on the main body. There are white hairs on the eye field and brown bristles near the eyes. It has a sternum that is lighter in colour than its carapace. The spider has a very low clypeus that also has white hairs. Its chelicerae are dark brown; its labium and maxillae are lighter. The elongated dark brown abdomen is between 2.2 and 2.5 millimetres (0.087 and 0.098 in) long and 1.4 and 1.5 millimetres (0.055 and 0.059 in) wide. It is covered in thin, translucent hairs with a similar large, leaf-shaped, fawn patch to the female. Its underside is brown.

Unlike the female, the male Menemerus minshullae has greyish-brown spinnerets. Its front legs are dark brown, the remainder lighter with dark stripes. They are covered in dense brown hairs. Its pedipalp, a sensory organ near its head, is brown with white hairs. There are also hairs on the base of the cymbium. Attached the cymbium, the spider's palpal bulb is oval with a wide furrow evident down the centre and a short embolus at its tip. The embolus has a larger accompanying conductor that almost dominates it. The pedipalp has short bloated femur and a wide tibial apophysis, or appendage, which has a distinctive valley-like morphology.

Spiders of the Menemerus genus are difficult to distinguish without careful consideration. A close observation of its copulatory organs helps to identify the female Menemerus minshullae, particularly the strongly sclerotized edges to the two large oval depressions in its epigyne. The male can be differentiated from related spiders by its small embolus and conductor, and particularly its sclerotized end.

== Behaviour ==
Due to their good eyesight, Menemerus spiders are mostly diurnal hunters. They attack using a complex approach to their prey and are generally more proactive in comparison to web-spinning spiders. The spiders will eat a wide range of prey, including nectar. They undertake complex displays and dances during courtship. Some of these will involve two males and a female. The males also undertake aggressive displays between themselves.

== Distribution and habitat ==
Menemerus spiders are found throughout Africa and Asia, with some species introduced more widely. Menemerus minshullae is endemic to Africa. It has been found in South Africa, Malawi and Zimbabwe. The male holotype was discovered in the Bvumba Mountains near Mutare on border between Mozambique and Zimbabwe and the female nearby in Umtali in 1979. Other examples were found in Bulawayo in 1983 and 1989. It was subsequently also seen in the Sengwa Wildlife Research Area in 2001 and 2002. The first to be found in Malawi was collected in 1976 near Chintheche. The species range was expanded to South Africa when examples were identified in Ndumo Game Reserve between 2005 and 2007. The spider thrives in arboreal environments. It seems to be particularly fond of living on Vachellia xanthophloea, with the flattened shape of its body enabling it to hide under shards of bark that become loosened from the tree.
