= MV Ilala =

Motor ship based in Lake Malawi, East Africa

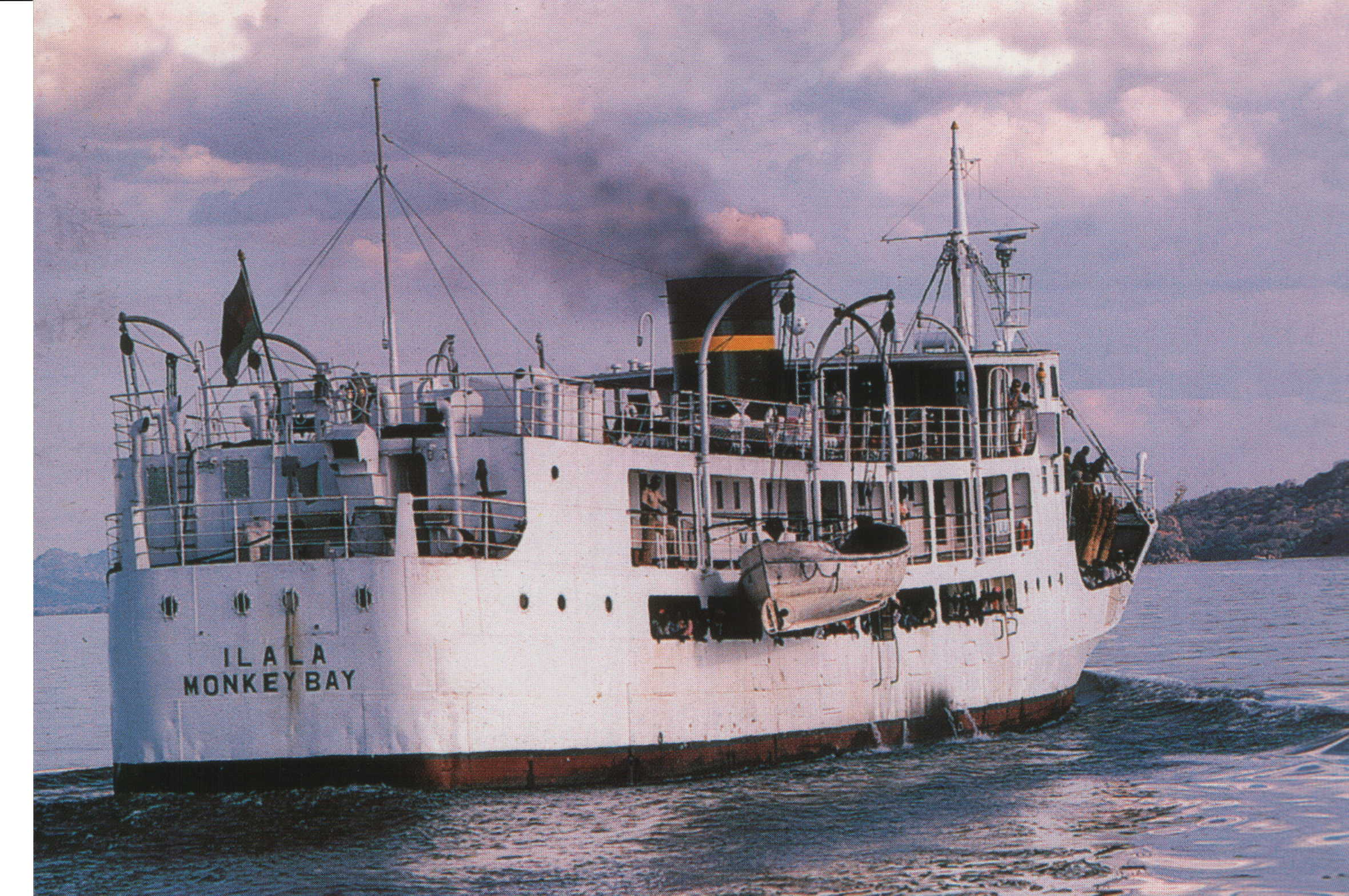
- The Ilala leaving Nkhata Bay in 1990

History
- Name: MV Ilala II
- Operator: Malawi Lake Services
- Port of registry: (Nyasaland) (Malawi) Monkey Bay
- Route: Monkey Bay - Chilumba
- Builder: Yarrow Shipbuilders, Scotstoun, Scotland
- Yard number: 1917
- Launched: 1949
- Completed: 1951
- Status: In service

General characteristics
- Tonnage: 620 tons
- Length: 52 m (172 ft)
- Installed power: Diesel
- Propulsion: Screw
- Capacity: 360 passengers; 100 tons of freight

MV Ilala, formally Ilala II, is a ferry that has plied Lake Malawi in East Africa since 1951. Every week she crosses the lake all the way north to Chilumba, Malawi, near Tanzania (about 480 km or 300 mi from Monkey Bay) and then returns to Monkey Bay. She carries both passengers and freight, and calls at major towns on both the Malawian and Mozambican coast, as well as at two islands of the lake (Likoma and Chizumulu).

While the ferry is often late (reportedly by as much as 24 hours or more) and has sometimes broken down she remains the most important means of long-distance transport for the people living on the coast of the lake. She is 52 m (172 ft) long overall, has a gross tonnage of 620 tons and can accommodate up to 365 passengers and 100 tons of cargo.

== History ==
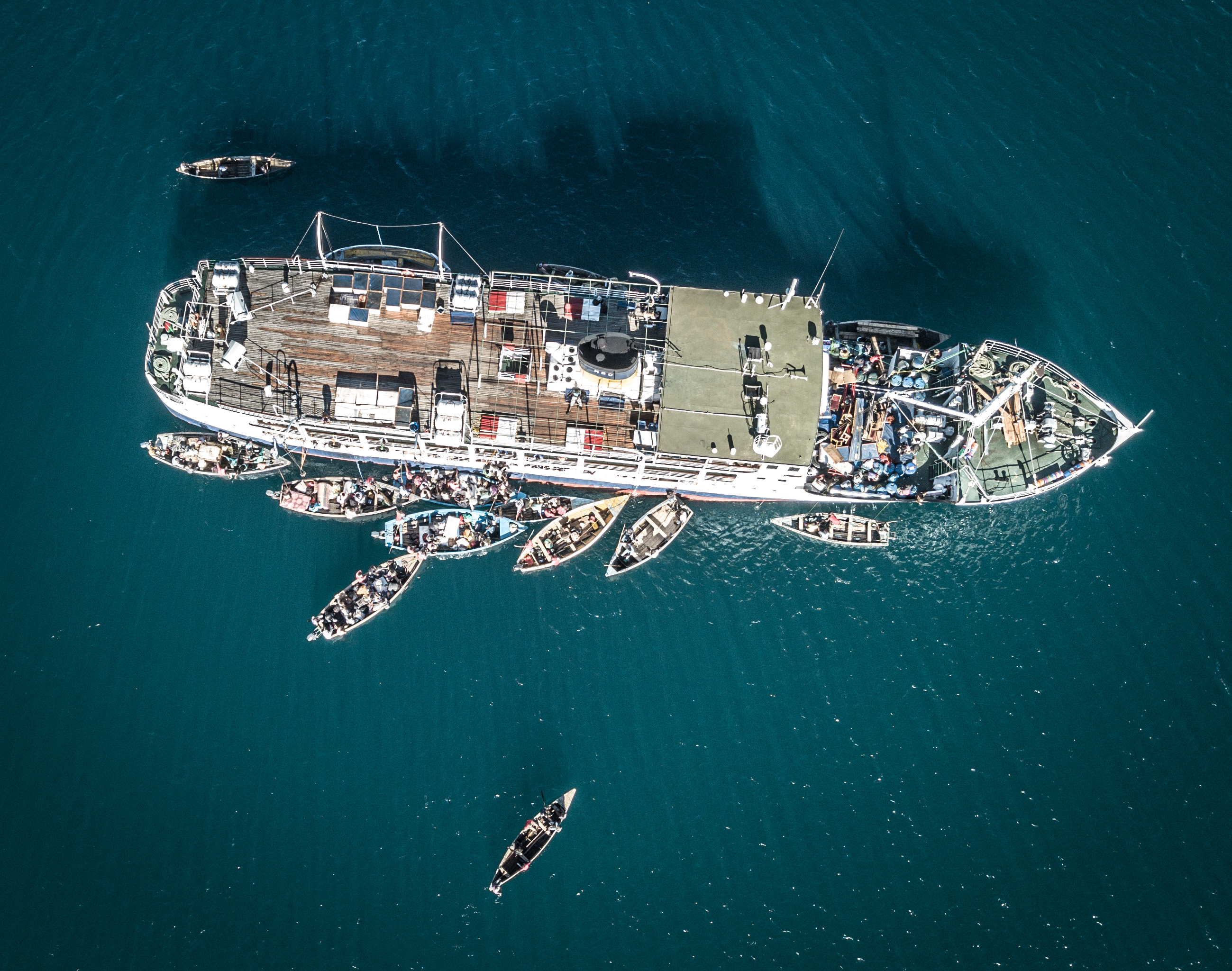
The Ilala on Lake Malawi in 2018

Yarrow Shipbuilders at Scotstoun near Glasgow, Scotland built Ilala for Nyasaland Railways in 1949. As she was the second boat to be built for service on Lake Malawi (the first being built in 1875 at Poplar), and her predecessor was called Ilala, the ship was formally named Ilala II, but she is now commonly called just Ilala and this is also how the name is painted on the hull. In turn, the first Ilala was named after the Ilala region of Zambia, where David Livingstone was first buried.

Once built, the ship was dismantled and transported to Malawi (then Nyasaland) in pieces, first by ship to Mozambique and then from Beira, Mozambique by rail and road to Chipoka. She is operated by Malawi Lake Services and based in Monkey Bay, Malawi (on the southern end of the lake); She began operating in 1951, and has run continuously since then, except for periods of maintenance. She also survived several groundings. Some steel panels have been repaired over time, and she was re-engined in the 1990s. When Ilala has been out of service for maintenance, she was usually replaced by a companion, newer ferry called MV Mtendere (which means "peace" in Chewa), which otherwise only cruises the southern part of the lake. The MV Chambo also provides additional coverage for Ilala.

== References in culture ==
Ilala at anchor in Lake Malawi, 1973

British historian, traveller and writer Oliver Ransford thus describes life aboard the MV Ilala in his book Malawi, Livingstone's Lake:

Each day on board, amid the excited bell ringing, siren shrieks and hooting that seem inseparable from all maritime arrivals and departures, laughing crowds of Malawians line up on the Ilala's deck to disembark, cluttered up with baggage that includes bicycles, cages filled with squawking fowl, sewing machines and even tethered goats. They are ferried ashore in lighters to return an hour or so later crammed with another batch of passengers who quickly settle down in the cramped quarters to cards and singing and sleeping and the preparation of meals in little cooking pots. It all looks and sounds like a cross between Hampstead Heath on a Bank holiday and an Eastern market, but when the ship weighs anchor again the noise dies down and the first class passengers resume in their novels, their deck chairs and their worship of the sun.

— O. Ransford, Malawi, Livingstone's Lake, 1977

The ship has been depicted in several postage stamps of Nyasaland/Malawi. In 2009, BBC Radio 4 and the BBC World Service broadcast a travelogue-style tribute in occasion of the Ilala's 60th anniversary, with interviews with managers, crew, passengers and tourists.

== Route ==
The MV Ilala weekly calls at the following places (they are visited in this order when the boat is going north, and in the inverse order when the boat goes back south):

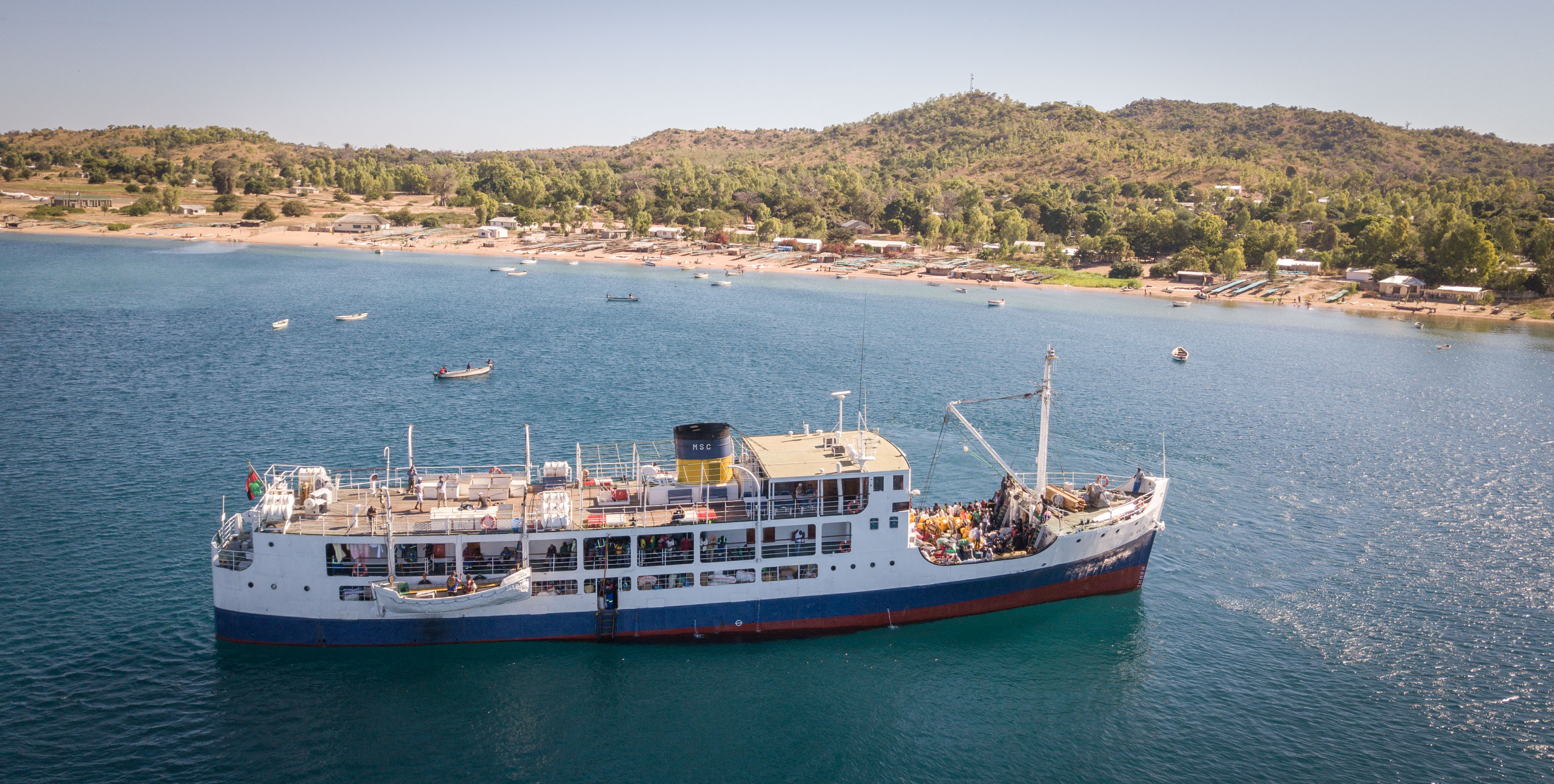
The Ilala on the shores of Likoma Island.

- Monkey Bay, Malawi
- Makanjila, Malawi
- Senga Bay, Malawi
- Nkhotakota, Malawi
- Likoma Island, Malawi
- Chizumulu Island, Malawi
- Nkhata Bay, Malawi
- Usisya, Malawi
- Ruarwe, Malawi
- Ncharo, Malawi
- Mlowe, Malawi
- Chilumba, Malawi

In the past, the ship used to reach further north to Karonga and the short strip of the northern coast of the lake belonging to Tanzania, but this route has been discontinued.
