= Labidochromis lividus =

Conservation status
- Least Concern (IUCN 3.1)

Scientific classification
- Kingdom: Animalia
- Phylum: Chordata
- Class: Actinopterygii
- Order: Cichliformes
- Family: Cichlidae
- Genus: Labidochromis
- Species: L. lividus

Binomial name
- Labidochromis lividus D. S. C. Lewis, 1982

Species of fish

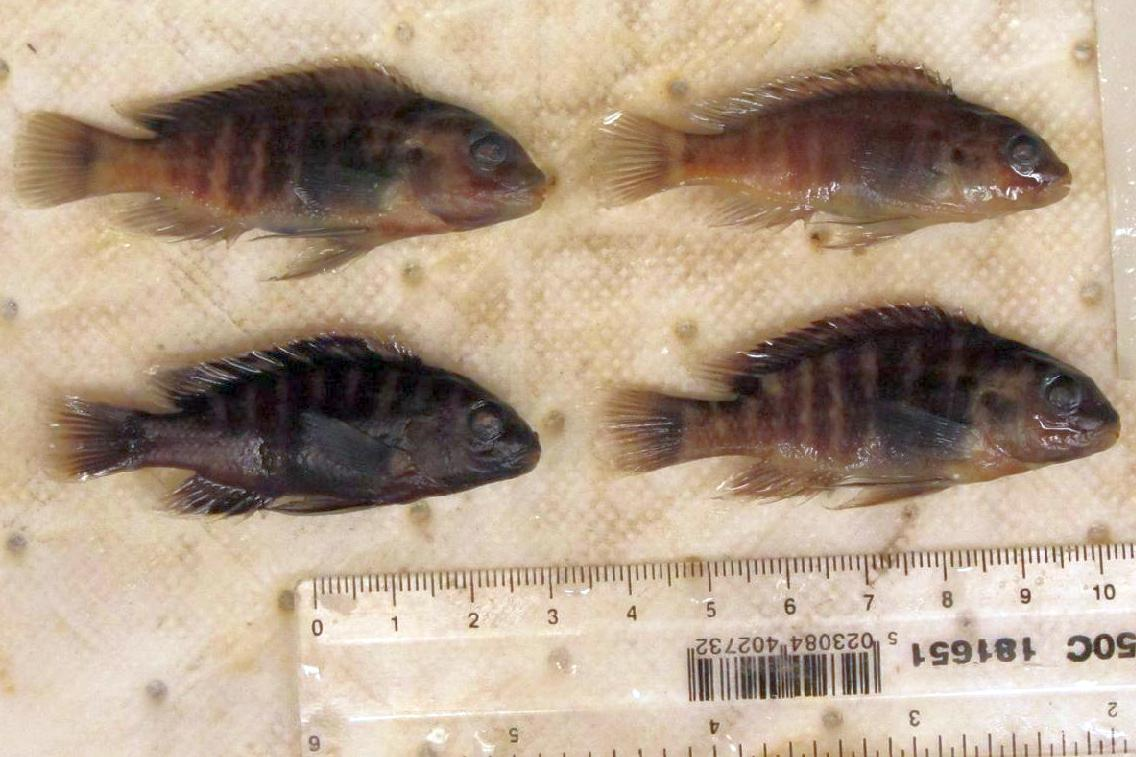

Labidochromis lividus is a species of cichlid endemic to Lake Malawi where it is only known to occur over rocky substrates along the western coast of Likoma Island. This species can reach a length of 7.1 centimetres (2.8 in) SL. It can also be found in the aquarium trade.

== Aquarium care ==
Like all cichlids from Lake Malawi they are best kept in specialist cichlid aquariums, specifically with other Mbuna. It is recommended to separate the pregnant female if raising a whole brood is desired. The fry can be raised on fine flake as well as, small live foods such as Artemia. Once the fish reach adulthood they can be fed larger live foods such as mosquito larvae, flake food, and food tablets.
