= Labidochromis ianthinus =

Conservation status
- Least Concern (IUCN 3.1)

Scientific classification
- Kingdom: Animalia
- Phylum: Chordata
- Class: Actinopterygii
- Order: Cichliformes
- Family: Cichlidae
- Genus: Labidochromis
- Species: L. ianthinus

Binomial name
- Labidochromis ianthinus D. S. C. Lewis, 1982

Species of fish

Labidochromis ianthinus is a species of cichlid endemic to Lake Malawi where it is only known to occur around the Mbenji Islands. This species can reach a length of 9 centimetres (3.5 in) TL. It can also be found in the aquarium trade.
