= Labidochromis maculicauda =

Conservation status
- Least Concern (IUCN 3.1)

Scientific classification
- Kingdom: Animalia
- Phylum: Chordata
- Class: Actinopterygii
- Order: Cichliformes
- Family: Cichlidae
- Genus: Labidochromis
- Species: L. maculicauda

Binomial name
- Labidochromis maculicauda D. S. C. Lewis, 1982

Species of fish

Labidochromis maculicauda is a species of cichlid endemic to Lake Malawi where it is only known from the northwestern coast. It prefers rocky areas and lives in shallow waters down to a depth of about 12 metres (39 ft). This species can reach a length of 6.4 centimetres (2.5 in) SL. It can also be found in the aquarium trade.
