= Chintheche =

- Location in Malawi
- Coordinates: 11°50′00″S 34°10′00″E
- Country: Malawi
- Region: Northern Region
- District: Nkhata Bay District
- Elevation: 1,581 ft (482 m)
- Time zone: +2
- Climate: Aw

Chintheche is a settlement in the Nkhata Bay District of the Northern Region of Malawi. It is on the shore of Lake Malawi, and is approximately 40 kilometres (25 mi) south of Nkhata Bay. The town is on the main road (M5) between Nkhata Bay and Nkhotakota.

== History ==
Chintheche Town was until about 1950 the headquarters of Nkhata Bay district then called West Nyasa. In the 1970s, the government of Hastings Banda planned to develop Chintheche into a new town of 25000 people, with a new harbour and a paper-processing plant. To accommodate the new development, residents of Chintheche were displaced further inland. The scheme would have created employment for thousands of people, but for the most part did not come to fruition; however, the displaced residents though not officially allowed to return to their lakeshore homes, actually returned at the revert to multiparty democracy in the early 1990s. Prominent people to have come from Chintheche Town or its hinterland include Elliot Kamwana, Yesaya Zerenji Mwasi and Clements Kadalie

== Arts and culture ==
Chintheche Town, formerly the headquarters of the district, is where the Lake of Stars Music Festival was held from 2004–2007. Chintheche Town is also the base of the Park Town Band. Other well known cultural dances in the area include Malipenga and Chilimika. Every year Mdawuku wa aTonga celebrates cultural practices of the Tonga people.

== Attractions and amenities ==
Chintheche has bars, restaurants, guest lodges, campsites, a supermarket and a cash and carry wholesaler; the majority of the town's amenities are along the Chintheche Strip.

=== Parks and recreation ===
The settlement is also identified as a beach town, as it is located on the beaches of Lake Malawi, including Chintheche and Chigumbuli Beaches.The impact of climate change and rising lake level is impacting the beaches and lodges. The beaches are similar to those found in the Caribbean, with white sand and tropical plants. Amongst the most popular hotels and lodges are the Chintheche Inn, Makuzi Lodge, Sambani Lodge, Chigumbuli Cottages, Kaweta Lodge, Kwidu and Dumuwa. the famous Beach House has since succumbed to the rising lake levels and shoreline erosion

== Infrastructure ==
Chintheche is on the paved M5 Salima – Mzuzu road. It is served by minibuses and taxis from Nkhata Bay, Nkhotakota and Mzuzu.the airport on the west of the town was closed in 1990s and currently is used as home ground for local soccer team Chintheche United FC The only tarred Roads are the M5 and stretch from M5 to Chintheche Inn. Otherwise, most roads in the Chintheche Town, though accessible all year round, are dirt tracks. There is one police station, hospital, post office, market, several schools and water supply.

=== Sources ===
- Davids Been Here, Malawi: Africa County Travel Guide 2014. Davids Been Here (2014).
