= Mary Hall (explorer) =

British explorer and travel writer known for the Cape Town to Cairo overland journey

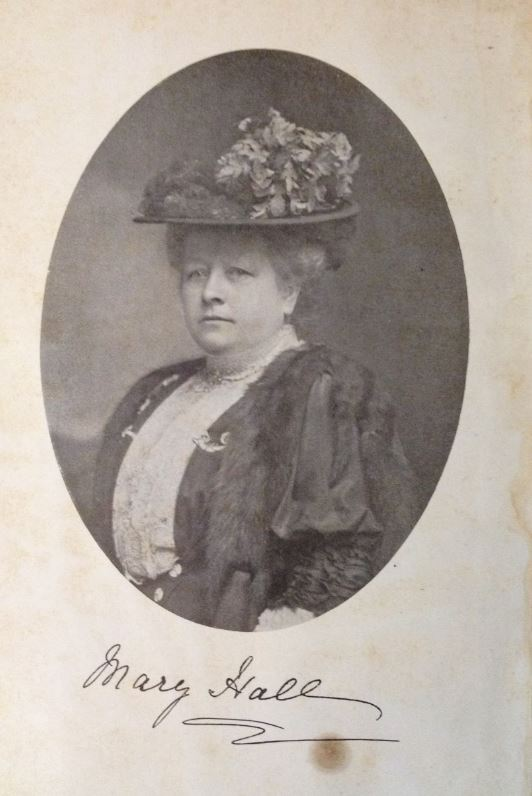
- Born: 1857
- Died: 1912 (aged 54–55)
- Occupations: Travel writer, explorer
- Known for: Travelling Africa alone from the south to the north

Mary Hall (1857 – 1912) was a British woman who crossed the continent of Africa from south to north 1857-1912. She published an account of her African journey "A Woman's Trek from the Cape to Cairo" in 1907. Her second journey took her to New Zealand, Australia, Papua New Guinea, Korea and China and her account of that was published after her death.

== Life ==
Hall was born in 1857.

She was well travelled already but unpublished when she set out on a journey that took her from Africa's southern point of Cape Town to Africa's far north in Cairo. She took advantage of the emerging railway which allowed her to partially travel by rail to Blantyre. Further travel by car was impossible. When she got to the River Shire she found that the river was too shallow. Their boat, the Monteith, could only reach Ndumbo. She had to travel there from Liwonde. The Monteith took her to Fort Johnston (which is now called Mangochi).

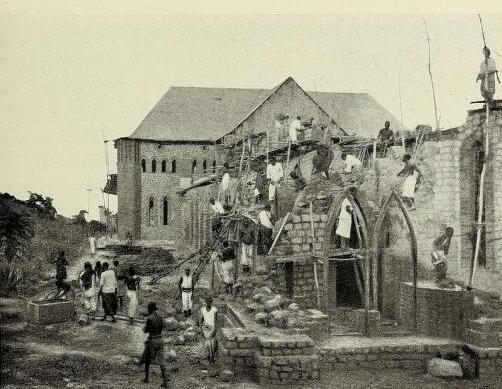
The building of St Peter's Cathedral in Likoma, witnessed by Hall. c. 1905

She travelled up Lake Nyasa on a boat called the Domira making several stops including at Monkey Bay, Kota Kota (now Nkhotakota), and Likoma. At Likoma she was able to witness the large church that was being built there. She left the boat at Kambwe and then travelled to Karonga in a machila. She trekked on to Fort Hill where she left Nyasaland.

In 1907 she published an account of her journey "A Woman's Trek from the Cape to Cairo".

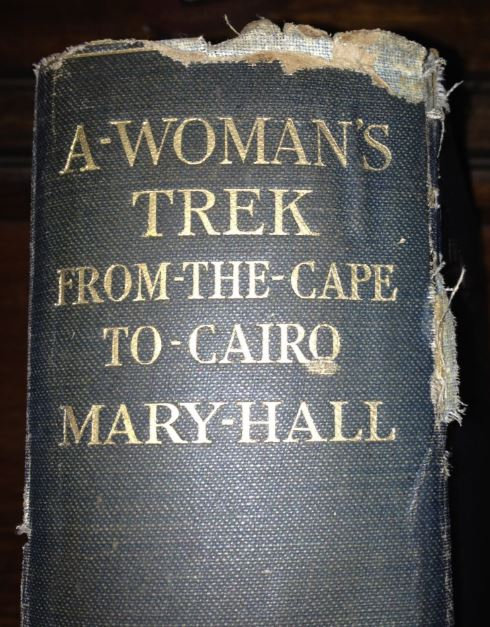
Mary Hall's "A Woman's Trek from the Cape to Cairo"

Hall gave lecturers about her travels in London and in New Zealand. She travelled through New Zealand and Australia to continue her journeys in Papua New Guinea, the Philippines, Korea and China before heading home to London on the Trans Siberian Railway. This was the basis for her second and last book.

== Death and legacy ==
Hall died in 1912. She is considered to be the first woman to travel overland from Cairo to Cape Town. In 1913 the Royal Geographical Society finally admitted the absurdity of publishing papers by women but not accepting them as fellows. Hall was among the 163 women admitted as fellows that year. A 1996 review of those admitted, started with Hall. It mentioned her second book about her journeys in the Antipodes and in the Far East was published in 1914. It was noted that her work was different to the normal globe trotter because of the "vivacity and shrewdness" of her "observation and comment".

Hall's travels were later followed by other women including Olivia Colville and Charlotte Mansfield.
