= Labidochromis textilis =

Conservation status
- Least Concern (IUCN 3.1)

Scientific classification
- Kingdom: Animalia
- Phylum: Chordata
- Class: Actinopterygii
- Order: Cichliformes
- Family: Cichlidae
- Genus: Labidochromis
- Species: L. textilis

Binomial name
- Labidochromis textilis M. K. Oliver, 1975

Species of fish

Labidochromis textilis is a species of cichlid endemic to Lake Malawi where it is found along the central portion of the eastern coast. This species grows to a length of 7.7 centimetres (3.0 in) SL.
