= Chrissie Kanyasho =

Malawian politician

- Born: Nkhata Bay
- Occupation: politician
- Known for: deputy minister of health
- Political party: United Transformation Movement

Chrissie Kanyasho is a Malawian politician who is a member of the National Assembly who represented Nkhata bay North. She was the deputy minister of health during the COVID-19 pandemic. She lost her seat in the 2025 election.

== Life ==
Kanyasho was born in Nkhata Bay.

She was a member of the United Transformation Movement and she represents the constituency of Nkhata bay North. She was first elected in the May 2019 elections. She is a member of the Malawi Parliamentary Women's Caucus and she has sat on the Budget Committee and the Pan African Committee.

In 2020 her party's deputy publicity secretary decided to leave the party and he joined the Democratic Progressive Party who were then in government. Kanyasho who was already the party's spokesperson on finance also took the deputy role for publicity. Later that year the Presidential elections were re-run and Lazarus Chakwera was elected. He had said that he would increase cabinet positions to be 40% women. He narrowly missed his own target but he appointed four women as ministers and eight as deputy ministers. Kanyasho became the deputy minister of health. In September 2020 during the COVID-19 pandemic she received supplies from China. China had sent a million dollars' worth of medical equipment which included test kits, thirty ventilators and a medical team. The supplies were to be distributed to hospitals.

In January 2021 the President declared a country wide emergency because of the pandemic. In July 2021 she noted that the country was facing a third wave of the pandemic and she was thanking the public, the church and Action for Progress Malawi for their assistance.

In 2023 she used her constituency development fund to create an office space for teachers at Nthembo school in Nkhata Bay.

She was the Nkhata Bay North Constituency candidate in the 2025 election. She obtained nearly 2,000 votes, but she was beaten by the DPP’s Mackenzie Chipalamoto who had over 4 600 votes.
