= Labidochromis mylodon =

Conservation status
- Least Concern (IUCN 3.1)

Scientific classification
- Kingdom: Animalia
- Phylum: Chordata
- Class: Actinopterygii
- Order: Cichliformes
- Family: Cichlidae
- Genus: Labidochromis
- Species: L. mylodon

Binomial name
- Labidochromis mylodon D. S. C. Lewis, 1982

Species of fish

Labidochromis mylodon is a species of cichlid endemic to Lake Malawi where it is only known to occur around Mumbo Island. This species can reach a length of 9 centimetres (3.5 in) TL. It is also found in the aquarium trade and is also raised as a food fish.
