= Chilumba =

Settlement in Malawi

- Location in Malawi
- Coordinates: 10°26′15″S 34°14′51″E
- Country: Malawi
- Region: Northern Region
- District: Karonga District
- Parliamentary constituency: Karonga South

Government
  - Member of Parliament: Malani Mtonga
- Elevation: 1,598 ft (487 m)

Population (2011)Estimate
  - Total: 5,000
- Time zone: +2
- Climate: Cwa

Chilumba is a town in Malawi. It is an urban centre in Karonga District.

== Location ==
Chilumba is located along the western shores of Lake Malawi, at the southern end of Karonga District, in the Northern Region of Malawi. This location is approximately 73 kilometres (45 mi), by road, south-east of the town of Karonga, where the district headquarters are located. Chilumba is located approximately 154 kilometres (96 mi), by road, north of the city of Mzuzu, the headquarters of Malawi's Northern Region. The geographical coordinates of Chilumba are:10°26'15.0"S, 34°14'51.0"E (Latitude:-10.437500; Longitude:34.247500). The own sits at an average elevation of 487 metres (1,598 ft), above mean sea level.

== Population ==
In 2011, the population of Chilumba was estimated at about 5,000 people.

== Overview ==
The section of lake facing Chilumba is called Chilumba Bay. The MV Ilala a steamboat, which connects the main settlements on Lake Malawi, has Chilumba as its northernmost stop. Once it has reached Chilumba, it starts its travel back to its base in Lusumbwe in the Southern Region of Malawi.

Heterogeneity in landscape gives Chilumba a unique environment for diversification of recreation and production activities. From the lake side, it is one of the unique places with Chirwa Island and Chitende Island, that host several species of plants, birds and fishes. The Islands are used by fishermen as temporary docking points.

The peninsula facing Chirwa is a typical feature with rocky shore with deep waters potentially suitable for rock diving. The bay facing the jetty has shallow waters for docking boats and potential for shallow water walking to 50m then swim into deep waters facing the Chitende Peninsula and Mphiri hills. West of the peninsula lies a 3 kilometres (2 mi) stretch of pure sand beach. The sand extends upland a distance of about 1 kilometre (1 mi) and magnificently looks like a desert of dark sand separated by two swamps. The upper land away from the lake is prime agricultural land used during the 1980s to early 1990s as a maize seed production diversification scheme. Behind lies a natural boundary of forest reserve that extends to the lake through Mphiri hills to the north, ideal for horse riding.
