= Labidochromis vellicans =

Conservation status
- Least Concern (IUCN 3.1)

Scientific classification
- Kingdom: Animalia
- Phylum: Chordata
- Class: Actinopterygii
- Order: Cichliformes
- Family: Cichlidae
- Genus: Labidochromis
- Species: L. vellicans

Binomial name
- Labidochromis vellicans Trewavas, 1935

Species of fish

Labidochromis vellicans is a species of cichlid endemic to Lake Malawi where it is found in areas with rocky substrates in the southern portion of the lake. This species grows to a length of 6.7 centimetres (2.6 in) SL. This species can also be found in the aquarium trade.
