= Nkhotakota =

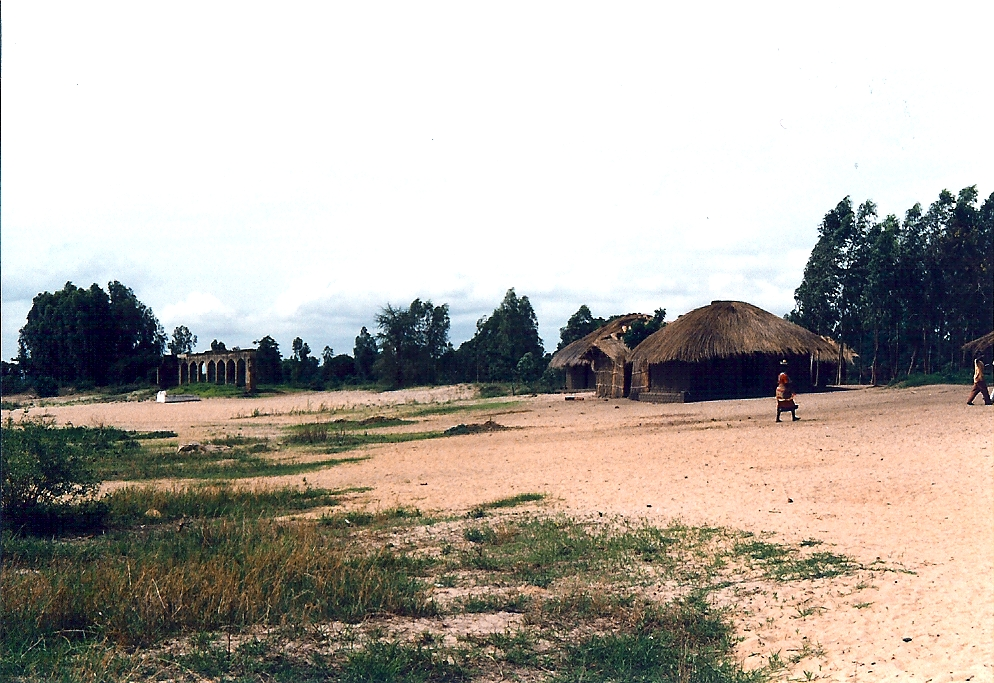
- Traditional mud and thatch houses on the beach of Lake Malawi in Nkhotakota

- Location in Malawi
- Coordinates: 12°55′00″S 34°18′00″E
- Country: Malawi
- Region: Central Region
- District: Nkhotakota District
- Elevation: 1,548 ft (472 m)

Population (2018 Census)
  - Total: 28,350
  - Languages: Chichewa
- Time zone: +2
- Climate: Aw

Nkhotakota (N-kho-tah-kho-tuh) (formerly Kota Kota) (name derived from the Chichewa for "Corner Corner") is a town and one of the districts in the Central Region of Malawi. It is on the shore of Lake Malawi (formerly Lake Nyasa) and is one of the main ports on Lake Malawi. As of 2018, Nkhotakota had a population estimated at 28,350. The district had a population of 301,000.

== History ==
Nkhotakota was originally a group of villages in the 19th century which later served as a market for Swahili-Arabian slave traders. David Livingstone convinced Chief Jumbe to stop trading slaves under a tree in Nkhotakota in the 19th century, which is currently in existence under a mission.

In 1905, Mary Hall came through here as she travelled to be the first woman to journey from Cape Town to Cairo. She had arrived from Mangochi.

Malawi president Hastings Banda gave speeches under another tree in Nkhotakota during the 1960s, this one ironically known as the Livingstone Tree. This town was hit by the 2001 floods, and was the worst hit area of Malawi's Central region. Today, Nkhotakota is the largest traditional African town in Malawi and bears a strong Swahili-Arab influence.

== Geography ==
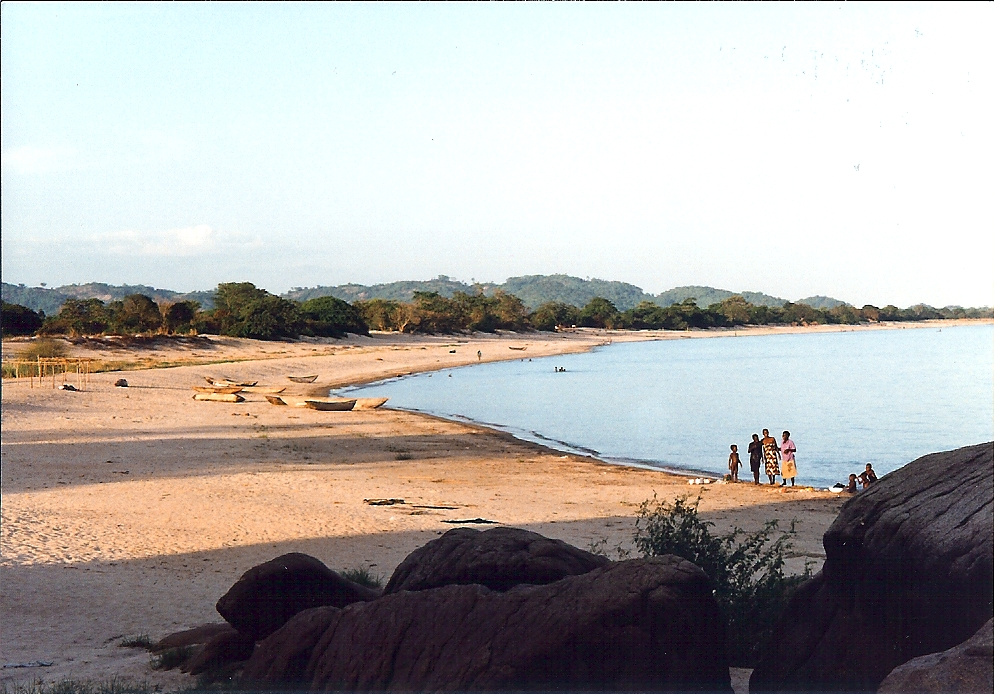
Mwaya Beach at Nkhotakota Bay on Lake Malawi

Nkhotakota lies at an elevation of 472 metres (1,548 ft) on the shore of Lake Malawi. It is located on a rocky ridge overlooking a natural harbour overlooking Nkhotakota Bay, formed by a sandbar. In addition, Nkhotakota is 200 kilometres (120 mi) from Lilongwe, Malawi's capital, and 378 kilometres (235 mi) from Blantyre, Malawi's largest city.

== Wildlife ==
Nkhotakota is home to the Nkhotakota Wildlife Reserve, where, according to Lonely Planet, one has a good chance of seeing elephants. The reserve is also home to several antelope species, buffalo, and leopards. Several large rivers cross this reserve, the largest in Malawi.

Roughly 24 kilometres (15 mi) south of Nkhotakota is the Chia Lagoon, a large bay linked to Lake Malawi by a narrow channel, crossed by a bridge near Nkhotakota's one major road.

== Economy ==
The biggest formal 'private' employer in the district is a sugar manufacturing company "Dwangwa Sugar corporation" (currently under Illovo). Most locals are smallholder farmers of rice, cassava and maize, while many others are small scale fishermen, who regularly fish along Lake Malawi's shores, Chia Lagoon and many other rivers including Bua, Dwangwa, Dwambazi and Chilua, using triangular nets on poles, hooks, etc.

Nkhotakota is also home to Malawi’s second largest pottery, known as the Nkhotakota Pottery, which combines pottery production with a lakeside lodge and restaurant at Nkhotakota Pottery Lodge. The pottery is the second biggest formal 'private' employer in the district of local residents and attracts both domestic and international tourists.

Another notable antiquity (tourist attraction) in Nkhotakota is the Mawira hot springs, an area of about 3 km^{2} of hot water that continuously gushes from the ground since time immemorial. Mawira hot springs is situated at the central area of the district, some 5 km from the Ntchisi/Kasungu road junction. Sungu Island (made of sand and rocks) is another fascinating place to visit in Nkhotakota central. This island is situated inside the Lake Malawi, 1.5 km from its shore, and approximately 2 km from Kaliba station (dock), where passenger boats cruising along Lake Malawi picks up or drops off passengers and small scale traders.

== Climate ==
Climate data for Nkhotakota (1961–1990)
Month	Jan	Feb	Mar	Apr	May	Jun	Jul	Aug	Sep	Oct	Nov	Dec	Year
Mean daily maximum °C (°F)	28.5 (83.3)	28.6 (83.5)	28.5 (83.3)	28.0 (82.4)	26.9 (80.4)	25.7 (78.3)	25.4 (77.7)	26.9 (80.4)	29.5 (85.1)	31.8 (89.2)	31.5 (88.7)	29.4 (84.9)	28.4 (83.1)
Daily mean °C (°F)	24.3 (75.7)	24.6 (76.3)	24.9 (76.8)	23.8 (74.8)	22.1 (71.8)	20.3 (68.5)	20.0 (68.0)	21.1 (70.0)	23.4 (74.1)	25.9 (78.6)	26.3 (79.3)	25.1 (77.2)	23.5 (74.3)
Mean daily minimum °C (°F)	21.1 (70.0)	21.4 (70.5)	20.9 (69.6)	20.1 (68.2)	17.9 (64.2)	15.7 (60.3)	15.3 (59.5)	15.9 (60.6)	18.0 (64.4)	20.8 (69.4)	22.0 (71.6)	21.3 (70.3)	19.2 (66.6)
Average precipitation mm (inches)	320.0 (12.60)	266.3 (10.48)	407.6 (16.05)	227.7 (8.96)	33.5 (1.32)	11.5 (0.45)	7.9 (0.31)	2.1 (0.08)	0.7 (0.03)	10.2 (0.40)	79.8 (3.14)	282.0 (11.10)	1,649.3 (64.93)
Average precipitation days (≥ 0.3 mm)	20	18	20	13	4	3	2	1	1	2	7	17	108
Average relative humidity (%)	83	81	81	77	72	66	65	62	59	58	63	77	70
Mean monthly sunshine hours	167.4	159.6	213.9	240.0	269.7	276.0	279.0	294.5	297.0	306.9	270.0	204.6	2,978.6
Mean daily sunshine hours	5.4	5.7	6.9	8.0	8.7	9.2	9.0	9.5	9.9	9.9	9.0	6.6	8.2
Source: NOAA

== Demographics ==
=== Population development ===
Year	Population
1977	10,312
1987	12,163
1998	19,262
2008	24,726
2018	28,250

=== Languages ===
Chichewa is the main language spoken in this town. A Swahili settlement was also established in Nkhotakota. Several Chewa speakers live to the south of Nkhotakota, and Tonga is spoken in its north.

== Facilities ==
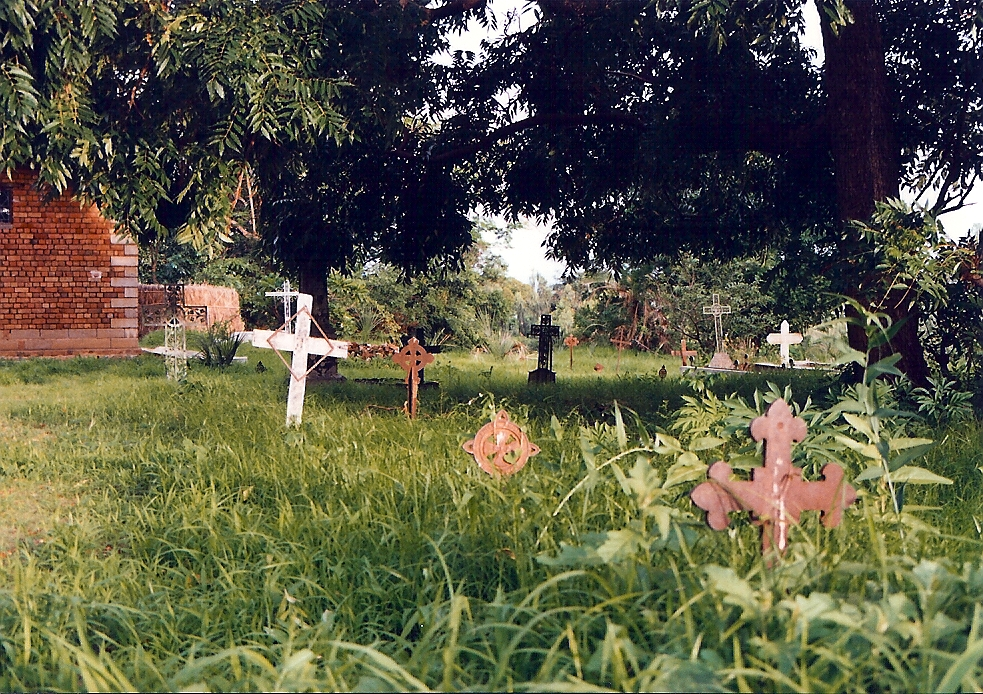
Christian cemetery in Nkhotakota

=== Medical ===
There are two hospitals in Nkhotakota: Nkhotakota District Hospital and St. Anne's Mission Hospital. However, in the whole district there are 23 health facilities including 1 district hospital, 1 mission hospital, 1 government rural hospital, 1 mission rural hospital, 11 health centres, 10 private clinics and 2 dispensaries. In its efforts in the fight against HIV/AIDS, the Society for Women Against AIDS in Malawi (SWAM) implemented a two-year project in Nkhotakota. Nkhotakota is also a regional hub for the [World Medical Fund] – a UK-based medical charity, whose rural outreach services provide the region's villages with basic medical care including anti-retrovirals, anti-malarial treatment and infectious disease management.

=== Banks ===
Branches of the First Discount House FDH Bank and NBS Bank are closely located at the central point of the town, on the junction of Salima/Lilongwe and Ntchisi/Kasungu. While Standard Bank (a branch of Standard Bank South Africa) is situated 50 km away at Illovo sugar company's premises in Dwangwa, where National Bank of Malawi and NBS Bank are situated. These commercial Banks provide several banking and other financial services including; foreign currency exchange facilities for local residents and foreign tourists. There are also many Bank agents at the Boma and many trading Centers around the district.

== Transport ==
Nkhotakota is one of the main ports on Lake Malawi, and it is served by the ferry MV Ilala that weekly crosses Lake Malawi. The nearest airport is at Kasungu, 77 kilometres (48 mi) away. Buses run from Salima for two hours daily. In addition, minibuses run from here to Nkhata Bay along the main road which connects these towns.

== Notable people ==
- Martha Mwale became the first woman Presbyterian minister in Malawi in 2001.
- Essau Kanyenda, former Malawian national team football striker
