= Charlotte Mansfield =

English novelist, poet and traveler

Charlotte Mansfield

Charlotte Mansfield (1881–1936) was an English novelist, poet, and traveler, known for her planned 1909 "Cape to Cairo" journey. She was incorrectly reported to have been the first woman to make the journey, even though someone already had and Mansfield didn't complete the challenge.

Charlotte Mansfield was also an accomplished needlework artist, and exhibited her embroidery work in London.

== Career ==
Mansfield's novels include Torn Lace (1904); The Girl and the Gods (1907); Love and a Woman; Red Pearls (1914); Gloria, a Girl of the South African Veldt (1916); The Dupe (1917), a World War I spy story; Sex and Siller (1920); and Strings (1920), a supernatural thriller about an evil violin. She also published two books of poems, Flowers of the Wind (1899), and Poems (1902). The Spectator reviewer called her poetry "verses of indifferent quality, now and then audacious in sentiment."

Her widely publicized "Cape to Cairo" tour in fact only reached to Lake Tanganyika before returning to South Africa and Mary Hall had already made that trip and published a book with that title. Mansfield wrote about her travels in southern Africa in Via Rhodesia: A Journey Through Southern Africa (1911)). In reviewing the book, The Register of Adelaide commented, "a less fitting person to follow in the steps of Mary Kingsley could hardly be imagined."

Mansfield's Gloria, A Girl of the South African Veldt was one of the first South African novels to be adapted for the screen, when American director Lorimer Johnston made a silent picture at Killarney Film Studios in 1916 based on Mansfield's novel, starring English actress Mabel May in the title role.

Charlotte Mansfield was also an accomplished needlework artist, and exhibited her embroidery work in London.

== Personal life ==
In 1909, she married mining engineer Vladimir Raffalovich in London; they lived in Johannesburg, South Africa. Alfred Edward Turner and Mansfield's new sister-in-law Vera Raffalovich Friedlander presented and hosted the wedding festivities. Vladimir Raffalovich survived Charlotte Mansfield Raffalovich when she died in 1936, aged 55 years.
