= Labidochromis pallidus =

Conservation status
- Least Concern (IUCN 3.1)

Scientific classification
- Kingdom: Animalia
- Phylum: Chordata
- Class: Actinopterygii
- Order: Cichliformes
- Family: Cichlidae
- Genus: Labidochromis
- Species: L. pallidus

Binomial name
- Labidochromis pallidus D. S. C. Lewis, 1982

Species of fish

Labidochromis pallidus is a species of cichlid endemic to Lake Malawi where it is only known to occur around the Maleri Islands and around Thumbi West Island. This species can reach a length of 6.7 centimetres (2.6 in) SL. It can also be found in the aquarium trade.
