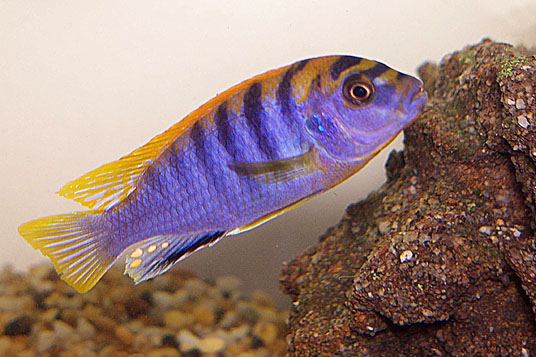

Scientific classification
- Kingdom: Animalia
- Phylum: Chordata
- Class: Actinopterygii
- Order: Cichliformes
- Family: Cichlidae
- Tribe: Haplochromini
- Genus: Labidochromis
- Species: L. sp. "Hongi"

Binomial name
- Labidochromis sp. "Hongi"

= Labidochromis sp. "Hongi" =

Labidochromis sp. "Hongi" is an undescribed species of cichlid fish from Eastern Africa. Other names for the fish include kimpuma, Hongi red top and Hongi cichlid. It is well known in the aquarium trade. The maximum size of the species is about 5 inches for the males while the females stay around 3.5 inches.

== Distribution ==
It is distributed along the Tanzanian coast of Lake Malawi, between Liuli and Undu Reef.

== Diet, behavior and habitat ==
This fish is an omnivore. It is a maternal mouthbrooder. It is considered mildly aggressive and territorial, defending its territory especially when breeding. It lives in a rocky habitat, and prefers caves in the aquarium.

== Literature ==
- Conkling, D. 1993. Labidochromis "red-top kimpuma" -a long time wait pays off. Cichlid News 2(4): 12-13.
- Konings, A. 1995. Malawi cichlids in their natural habitat, 2nd edition. Cichlid Press, Germany, 352pp.
- Lewis, D.S.C. 1982. A revision of the genus Labidochromis (Teleostei: Cichlidae) from Lake Malawi. Zool. J. Linn. Soc. 75: 189-265.
- Trewavas, E. 1935. A synopsis of the cichlid fishes of Lake Nyasa. Ann. Mag. Nat. Hist. (10) 16: 65-118.

== See also ==
- List of freshwater aquarium fish species
- Mbuna
