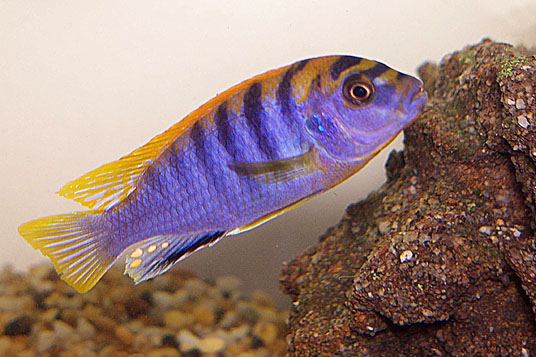
- Labidochromis sp. "Hongi Island"

Scientific classification
- Domain: Eukaryota
- Kingdom: Animalia
- Phylum: Chordata
- Class: Actinopterygii
- Order: Cichliformes
- Family: Cichlidae
- Tribe: Haplochromini
- Genus: Labidochromis; Trewavas, 1935

Type species
- Labidochromis vellicans Trewavas, 1935

= Labidochromis =

Genus of fish

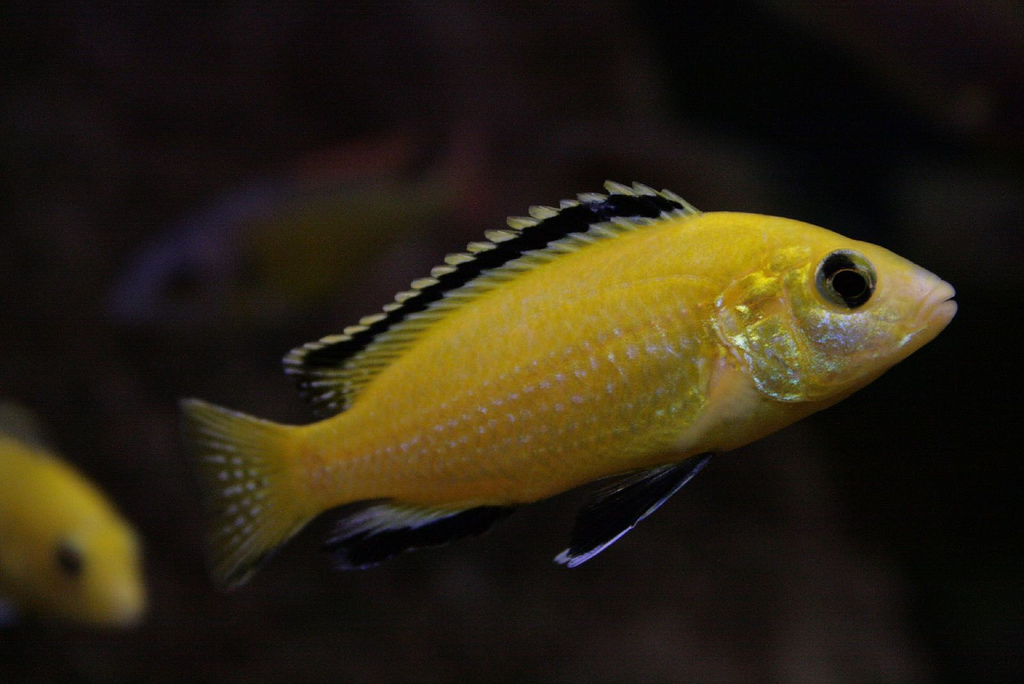
Labidochromis caeruleus

Labidochromis is a genus of cichlid fish that are endemic to Lake Malawi in East Africa. The genus includes 18 formally described species, and several yet undescribed species. It includes a number of species commonly kept in cichlid aquariums such as L. caeruleus (electric yellow). The species in this genus can easily hybridize, so if kept in an aquarium it is recommended to only have one species from this genus.

== Species ==
There are currently 18 recognized species in this genus:

- Labidochromis caeruleus Fryer, 1956 (Blue streak hap)
- Labidochromis chisumulae D. S. C. Lewis, 1982
- Labidochromis flavigulis D. S. C. Lewis, 1982 (Chisumulu pearl)
- Labidochromis freibergi D. S. Johnson, 1974
- Labidochromis gigas D. S. C. Lewis, 1982
- Labidochromis heterodon D. S. C. Lewis, 1982
- Labidochromis ianthinus D. S. C. Lewis, 1982
- Labidochromis lividus D. S. C. Lewis, 1982
- Labidochromis maculicauda D. S. C. Lewis, 1982
- Labidochromis mathotho W. E. Burgess & H. R. Axelrod, 1976
- Labidochromis mbenjii D. S. C. Lewis, 1982
- Labidochromis mylodon D. S. C. Lewis, 1982
- Labidochromis pallidus D. S. C. Lewis, 1982
- Labidochromis perlmutt
- Labidochromis shiranus D. S. C. Lewis, 1982
- Labidochromis strigatus D. S. C. Lewis, 1982
- Labidochromis textilis M. K. Oliver, 1975
- Labidochromis vellicans Trewavas, 1935
- Labidochromis zebroides D. S. C. Lewis, 1982

There is also one potentially undescribed species:

- Labidochromis sp. Hongi
