= Labidochromis mathotho =

Conservation status
- Data Deficient (IUCN 3.1)

Scientific classification
- Kingdom: Animalia
- Phylum: Chordata
- Class: Actinopterygii
- Order: Cichliformes
- Family: Cichlidae
- Genus: Labidochromis
- Species: L. mathotho

Binomial name
- Labidochromis mathotho W. E. Burgess & H. R. Axelrod, 1976

Species of fish

Labidochromis mathotho is a species of cichlid endemic to Lake Malawi. This species grows to a length of 8 centimetres (3.1 in) TL.

== Etymology ==
The fish is named in honor of A. J. Mathotho, Chief Fisheries Officer, Malawi
