= Labidochromis shiranus =

Conservation status
- Least Concern (IUCN 3.1)

Scientific classification
- Kingdom: Animalia
- Phylum: Chordata
- Class: Actinopterygii
- Order: Cichliformes
- Family: Cichlidae
- Genus: Labidochromis
- Species: L. shiranus

Binomial name
- Labidochromis shiranus D. S. C. Lewis, 1982

Species of fish

Labidochromis shiranus is a species of cichlid endemic to Lake Malawi where it is only known to occur along the western coast of the southeastern arm of the lake. This species can reach a length of 7.8 centimetres (3.1 in) SL. It can also be found in the aquarium trade.
