= Monkey Bay =

Monkey Bay Lusumbwe
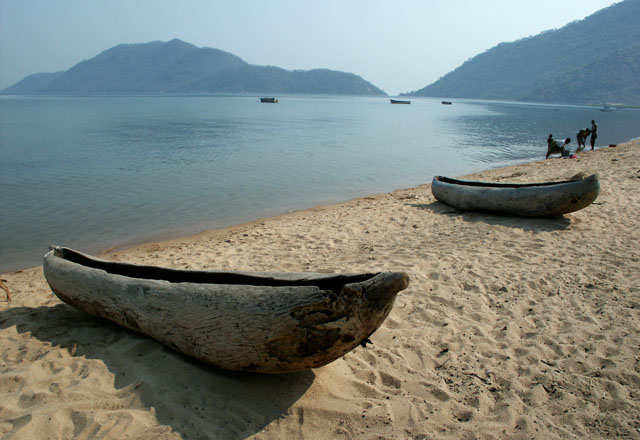
- Beach at Cape Maclear near Monkey Bay

- Location in Malawi
- Coordinates: 14°05′00″S 34°55′00″E
- Country: Malawi
- Region: Southern Region
- District: Mangochi District
- Elevation: 1,630 ft (500 m)

Population (2018 Census)
  - Total: 14,955
- Time zone: +2
- Climate: Aw

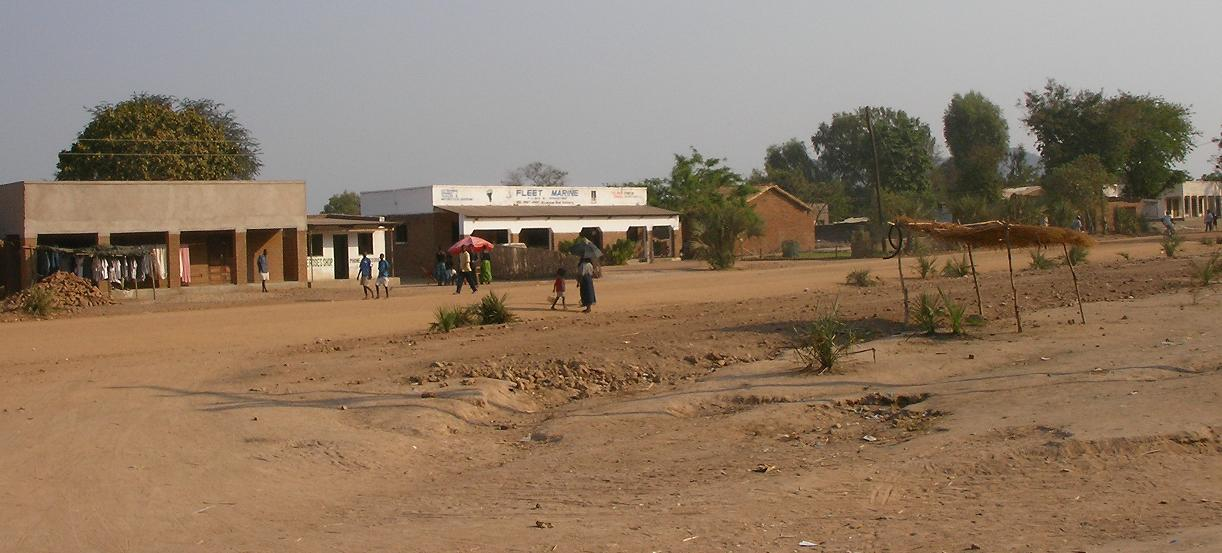
Main north-south street of the town.

Monkey Bay or Lusumbwe is a town in Mangochi which is in the Mangochi District in the Southern Region of Malawi. The town is on the shore of Lake Malawi and is one of the main ports on Lake Malawi. The population of Monkey Bay was 14,955 according to the 2018 census. Monkey Bay is 206 kilometres (128 mi) from Lilongwe, Malawi's capital city, and 253 kilometres (157 mi) from Blantyre. Monkey Bay is a tourist resort and is often travelled through on the road to Cape Maclear.

== History ==
Monkey Bay was ruled by the Muslim Yao chief and slave trader, Mponda, during the 1880s.

In 1905 the explorer Mary Hall passed through here as she became the first woman to travel the length of Africa from Cape Town to Cairo.

In the late 19th century, the first Bishop of Likoma, Chauncy Maples, drowned near Monkey Bay in Lake Malawi. In the 1960s, there was a Fisheries Research Laboratory in Monkey Bay, funded by the then-Nyasaland colonial government.

== Geography ==
Monkey Bay is on the shore of Lake Malawi and is one of the main ports on Lake Malawi. It is at an elevation of 500 m (1,630 ft).

Monkey Bay is situated 6 km (4 mi) from Chimpamba, 3 km (2 mi) from Zambo, 1.5 km (1 mi) from Msumbi and 17.9 km (11.12 mi) from Cape Maclear.

== Living standards ==
In March 2003, the then-Malawian President Bakili Muluzi held a rally in Monkey Bay, and promised to help reduce poverty. The charity Save the Children is active in the Monkey Bay area. According to a German development volunteer working with the Back to School Foundation, the residents of Monkey Bay are not living at the poverty line, but at the existence line. Houses are simple clay cottages, and few households can afford electricity, as the connection costs alone are three times the average monthly wage.

== Facilities ==
=== Amenities ===
There is a supermarket and a market in Monkey Bay, although there are bureaux de change or automatic teller machines. On 22 February 2010, a first bank opened its doors. Malawi Savings Bank which was operating from the Post Office building moved into their own convenience, a refurbished and spacious building at the trading centre.

There was not a functioning internet café in 2007 but there were signs for one. There are several guesthouses. The nearest ATM is in the town of Mangochi.

=== Transport ===
Monkey Bay is connected to Lilongwe and Blantyre by bus services. The nearest airport is at Ulongwe, 79 km (49 mi) away. Two passenger ferries make weekly sailings along Lake Malawi between Monkey Bay and Chilumba; the MV Ilala and the Mtendere. The Ilala is 350-passenger steamship that has served the route since 1951. In March 2003, the European Union funded improvements to the road linking Monkey Bay with Masasa and Golomoti. In February 2006, the Malawian government announced plans to build a road from Monkey Bay to Cape Maclear. In March 2006, there was no road access to Monkey Bay, after the worst floods since 1978 had washed away several kilometres of road and a bridge. The rainfall measured around 158 millimetres (6.2 in) and several thousand people in the Mangochi District were made homeless.

=== Education ===
The Nankhwala Catholic School is in Monkey Bay.

=== Medical ===
Monkey Bay has a hospital, but medical services are not extensive; surgery and diagnostics are however available in Monkey Bay.

=== Law and military ===
Monkey Bay has a police station. It is also the headquarters of the 220-strong marine force of the Army of Malawi.

== Tourism ==
Monkey Bay has been described as "the country's best known resort" by Agence France-Presse, and Factiva refers to Monkey Bay as the "best known resort-area" in Malawi. The area has "sandy beaches and tropical fish", and is popular with tourists. There are diving schools in Monkey Bay, however, according to the Daily Telegraph, the schools are considered poor by tourists. The town is also a transit point to Cape Maclear.

== Demographics ==
| Year | Population |
|---|---|
| 1987 | 5,649 |
| 1998 | 10,749 |
| 2008 | 11,246 |
| 2018 | 14,955 |
