= Karonga South (Malawi Parliament constituency) =

Karonga South is a constituency for the National Assembly of Malawi, located in the Karonga District of Malawi's Northern Region. It elects one Member of Parliament by the first past the post system. The constituency is currently represented by People's Party MP Malani Mtonga
