= Cobue =

- Location within Mozambique
- Coordinates: 12°8′38″S 34°45′31″E
- Country: Mozambique
- Provinces: Niassa Province

Cobue is a small lake-side town in Niassa Province, in north-west Mozambique. It is located on the shore of Lake Niassa.
