= Chizumulu Island =

Island in Malawi

Coordinates: 12°01′S 34°37′E

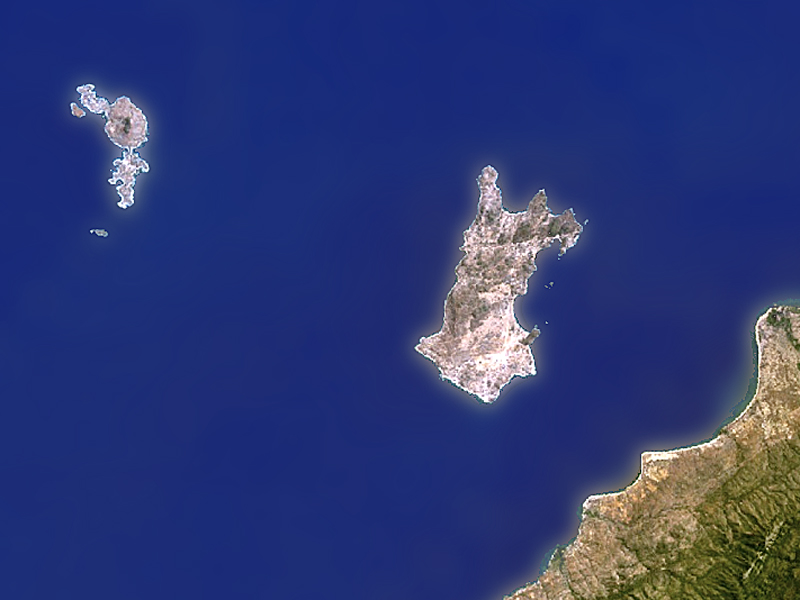
Satellite picture of Likoma island (right) and Chizumulu island (left)

Chizumulu Island is the smaller of two islands in Lake Malawi, the larger being the nearby Likoma island, which together make up the Likoma District. Both these islands lie just a few kilometres from Mozambique and are entirely surrounded by Mozambican territorial waters, but they belong to Malawi. They are therefore exclaves of Malawi. This came about because the islands were colonised by Anglican missionaries spreading east from Nyasaland, rather than by the Portuguese who colonised Mozambique. The British originally claimed the entire Lake Nyasa/Lake Malawi, but in 1954 signed an agreement with Portugal, which recognized the centre of the lake as the boundary between their holdings and Mozambique, and making these islands an enclave.

Chizumulu can be reached by steamer from the port of Nkhata Bay on the mainland of Malawi. The MV Ilala steamer that weekly crosses Lake Malawi stops at Chizumulu. Smaller boats including dhows cross the strait between Likoma and Chizumulu.

The island supports a population of about 4,000 people. Like Likoma, the island imports most of its food from the mainland. There is electricity on the island from 6 am to 10 pm (with a break between 12 and 2 pm), and no road. However, there is a well-constructed path which runs around the outside of the island, which can be walked around in about three hours.

The island consists of two large hills, with a flatter area to the south. Cassava plantations cover much of the lower slopes of the hills, with the upper parts being forested. Many baobab trees are present.

The locals speak a Nkamanga dialect, a dialect of Chitumbuka, as well as chiChewa languages.

A football club named Chizumulu United participates in the Northern Region Premier League, on the third tier of the Malawi football pyramid.
