= Likoma Island =

Island in Lake Malawi

Coordinates: 12°04′S 34°44′E

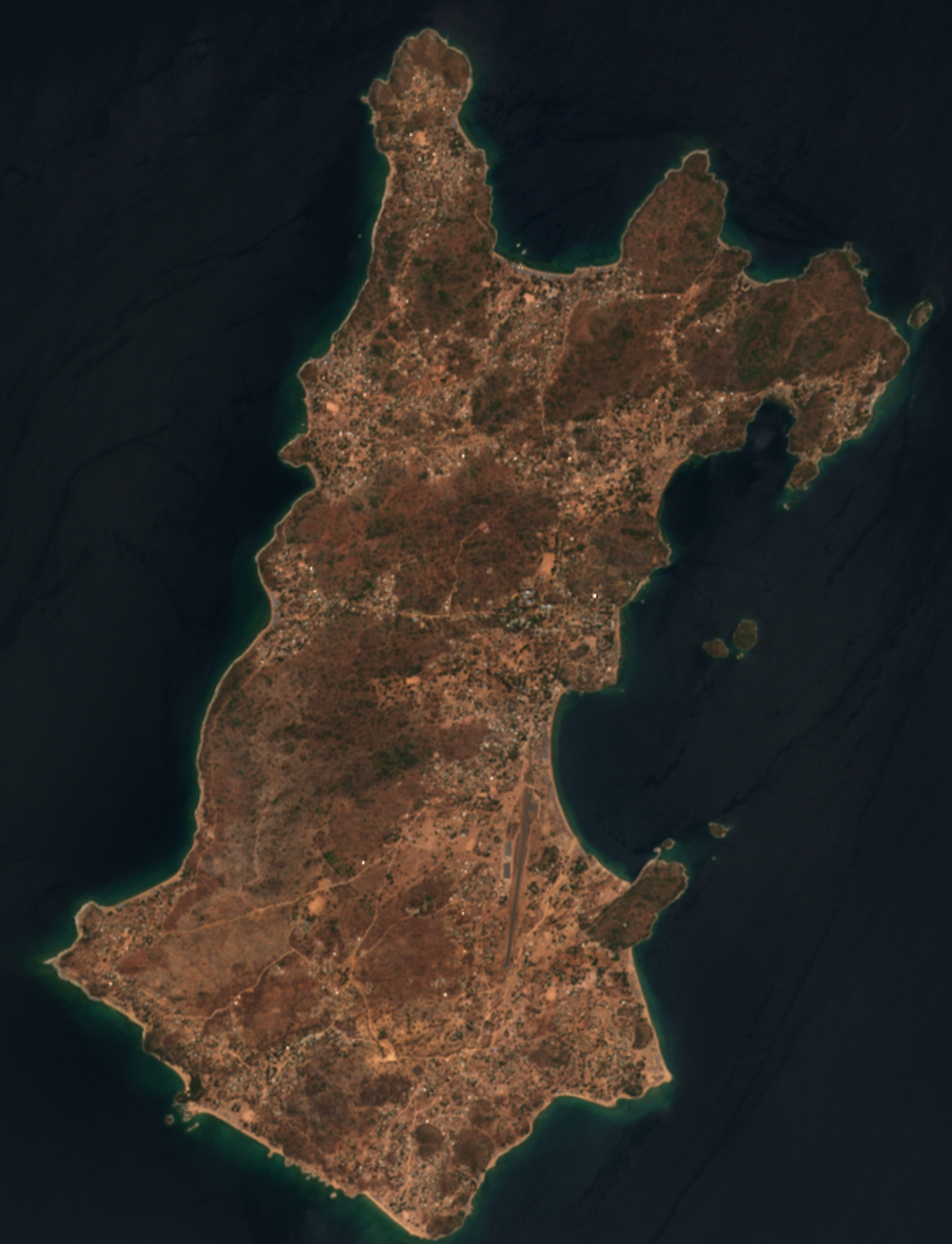
- Sentinel-2 satellite image of the island

- Location within Malawi

Geography
- Location: Lake Malawi
- Archipelago: Likoma Islands
- Adjacent to: Lake Malawi
- Total islands: 2
- Major islands: Likoma, Chizumulu Island
- Area: 18 km^{2} (6.9 sq mi)

Administration
- Malawi
- Region: Northern Region
- District: Likoma
- Capital and largest city: Likoma

Demographics
- Population: 9,000
- Pop. density: 500/km^{2} (1300/sq mi)

Likoma Island is the larger of two islands in Lake Malawi, in East Africa, the smaller being the nearby Chizumulu. Likoma and Chizumulu both belong to Malawi, and together they make up the Likoma District. Although both islands lie just a few kilometres from Mozambique, and are entirely surrounded by Mozambican territorial waters, they are both exclaves of Malawi.

== Geography ==
The island has an overall area of 18 km^{2}, and is located in the north-eastern part of Lake Malawi, 7 km north-west of Cobue, Mozambique. The closest town on the Malawian coast is Chintheche.

== History ==
Settlement on the Island began as a result of Slave Trading, driving Natives to flee to the Island as place of refuge.

In 1884 Missionaries from the Universities' Mission to Central Africa, in response to a plea by David Livingstone, established their headquarters on Likoma Island. Due to the presence of British missionaries, the island was assigned to Malawi rather than Mozambique when national borders in East Africa were established after World War II.

== Natural environment ==
Despite a high population density, the natural environment of Likoma island is largely unspoiled. The coast is varied, with rocky slopes, sandy bays and swamps. The interior of the island is mostly covered by grassland, with a large number of baobab trees (of the Adansonia digitata species) and mango trees. Fauna is mostly composed of small reptilians, amphibians, birds and a number of invertebrates, including scorpion spiders. On the coast, crocodiles are occasionally seen. The waters around Likoma, as is usual in Lake Malawi, host a number of cichlids; some species, such as Labidochromis caeruleus likomae, are endemic of the Likoma area.

== Population ==
Likoma is densely populated, with about 10,500 inhabitants dispersed in a dozen settlements, the main being the eponymous town of Likoma; the nearby island of Chizumulu has a further 4,000 inhabitants. The most represented ethnic groups are the Nyanja people (60%) and the Tonga people (25%), followed by smaller groups of Tumbuka, Yao, and Chewa. Their main economic activity is fishing, although agriculture (mainly rice and cassava) is also represented. The town of Mbamba hosts a busy market. It is also the site of the Anglican Cathedral of St Peter, one of the largest churches in Africa.

As a consequence of poverty and insufficient hospitals, the situation of public health on the island is critical, although malaria (which is widespread in Malawi) has not been reported. In 2005-6, Likoma has been the subject of a scientific study on the epidemiology of HIV and other sexually transmitted diseases. Despite the minimal economic development of Likoma, there are several primary schools serving all settlements and Likoma Secondary School. Literacy is thus widespread.

== Infrastructures and transportation ==
Likoma has no paved roads, and there are few motor vehicles. Electricity is provided by a generator and a solar bank. This affords the island 24 hour electricity, with the exception of 1-5 minutes at around 10 pm, while they switch the power source. There is a small telephone network on the island, although telephones themselves are quite rare. Likoma Airport is a tarred airstrip found on the island and can be reached by plane from Lilongwe.

The island's main transportation is the MV Ilala steamer that circumnavigates Lake Malawi, stopping at the main settlements and the islands. The MV Chambo links the island with the town of Nkhata Bay on the west side of the lake once a week. Smaller boats (including dhows) cross the strait between Likoma and Chizumulu, and also between Likoma and Cobue in Mozambique. Both goods and people are transported through these routes.

Likoma is a tourist destination which has a few hotels and backpacker hostels, usually based on ecotouristic principles. The waters around Likoma support snorkelling and diving.

== Notable residents ==
The lawyer, Sarai Chisala-Tempelhoff's family come from here. Minister George Ntafu was born her in 1943 and Grace Malenga was also born here before going on to become one of Malawi's first woman doctors.

== Gallery ==
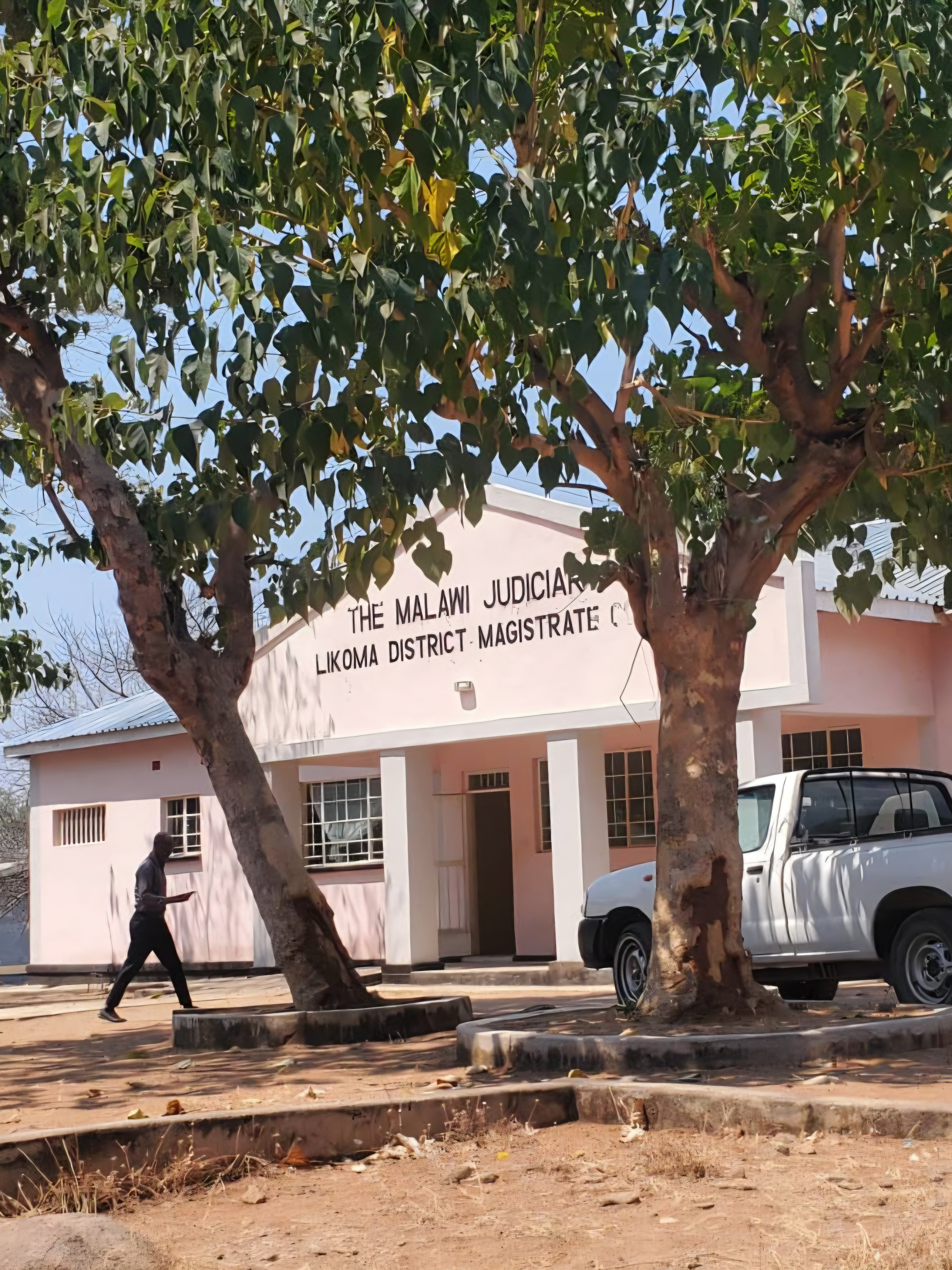
Likoma District Magistrate Court

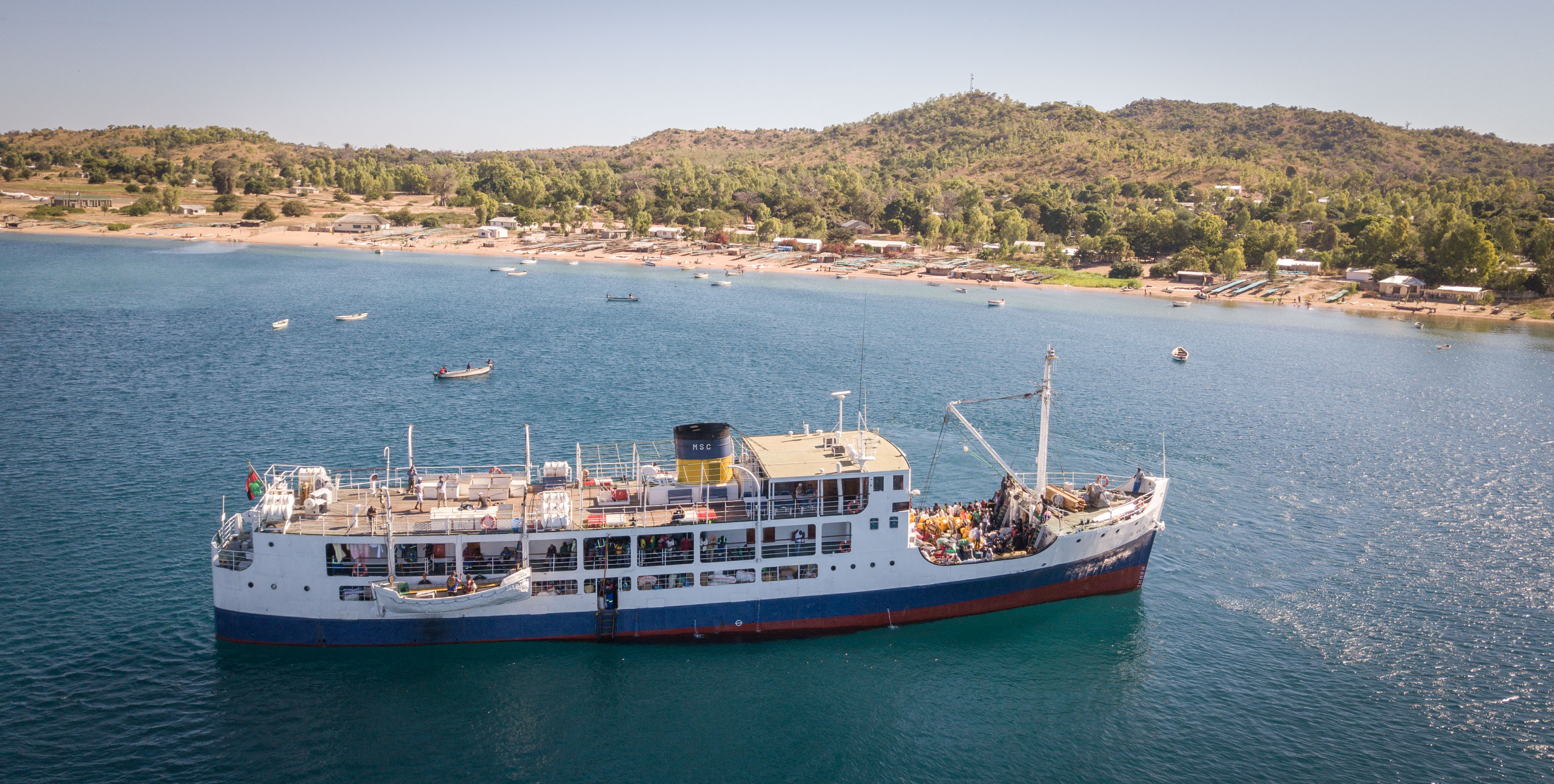
MV Ilala

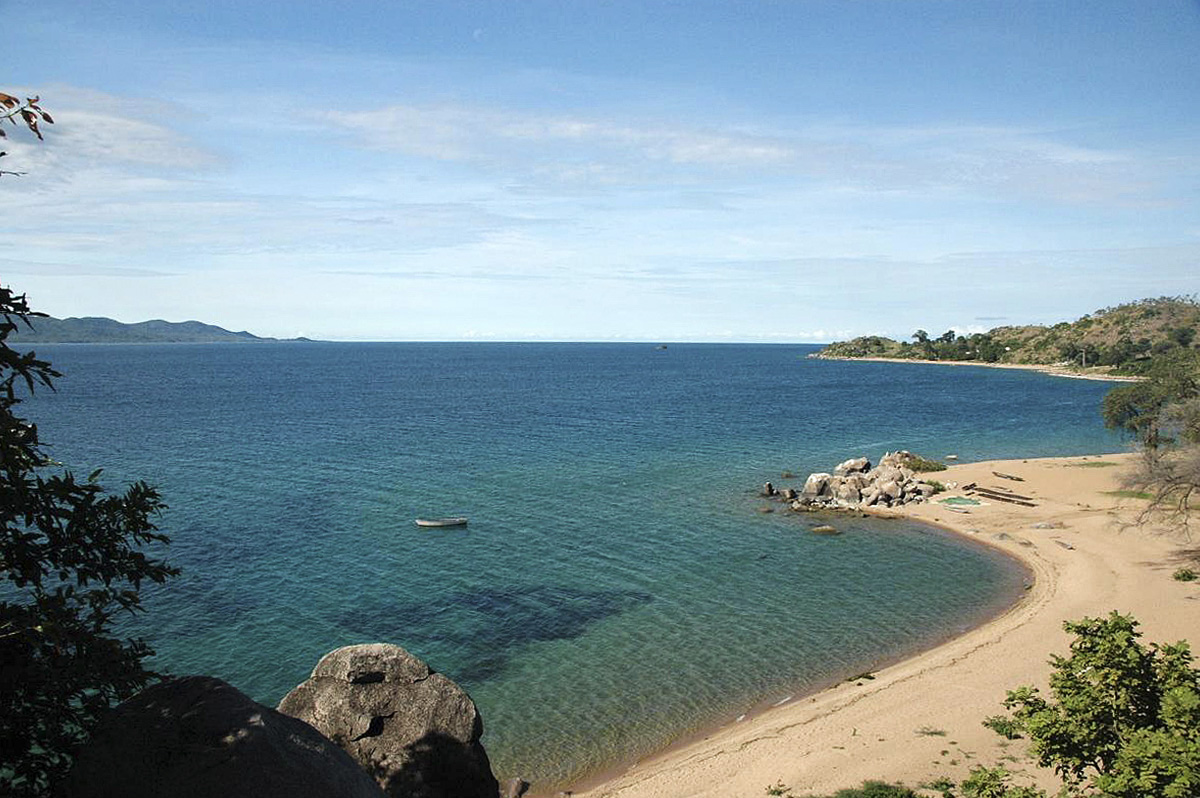
