= Regions of Malawi =

Regions of Malawi Madera Malawi (Chichewa)
- Category: Unitary state
- Location: Republic of Malawi
- Number: 3 Regions
- Populations: 2,289,780 (Northern Region) – 7,750,629 (Southern Region)
- Areas: 26,930 km^{2} (10,398 sq mi) (Northern Region) – 35,590 km^{2} (13,742 sq mi) (Central Region)
- Government: None
- Subdivisions: District

Malawi is divided into 3 regions which comprise a combined total of 28 districts. Regions have no administrative function; they serve merely to group districts.

The regions of Malawi are:

- Northern

Population: 2,289,780 (2018 census)
Area: 26,931 km^{2} (10,398 sq mi)
Capital: Mzuzu

- Central

Population: 7,523,340 (2018 census)
Area: 35,592 km^{2} (13,742 sq mi)
Capital: Lilongwe

- Southern

Population: 7,750,629 (2018 census)
Area: 31,753 km^{2} (12,260 sq mi)
Capital: Blantyre

== List ==
No.	Name	Population (2018)	Area (km^{2})
1	Northern	2,289,780	26,931
2	Central	7,523,340	35,592
3	Southern	7,750,629	31,753
	Malawi	21,240,689	118,484

== See also ==
- Districts of Malawi
- ISO 3166-2:MW
