= St Peter's Cathedral, Likoma =

Historic Anglican cathedral in Malawi

St Peter's Cathedral
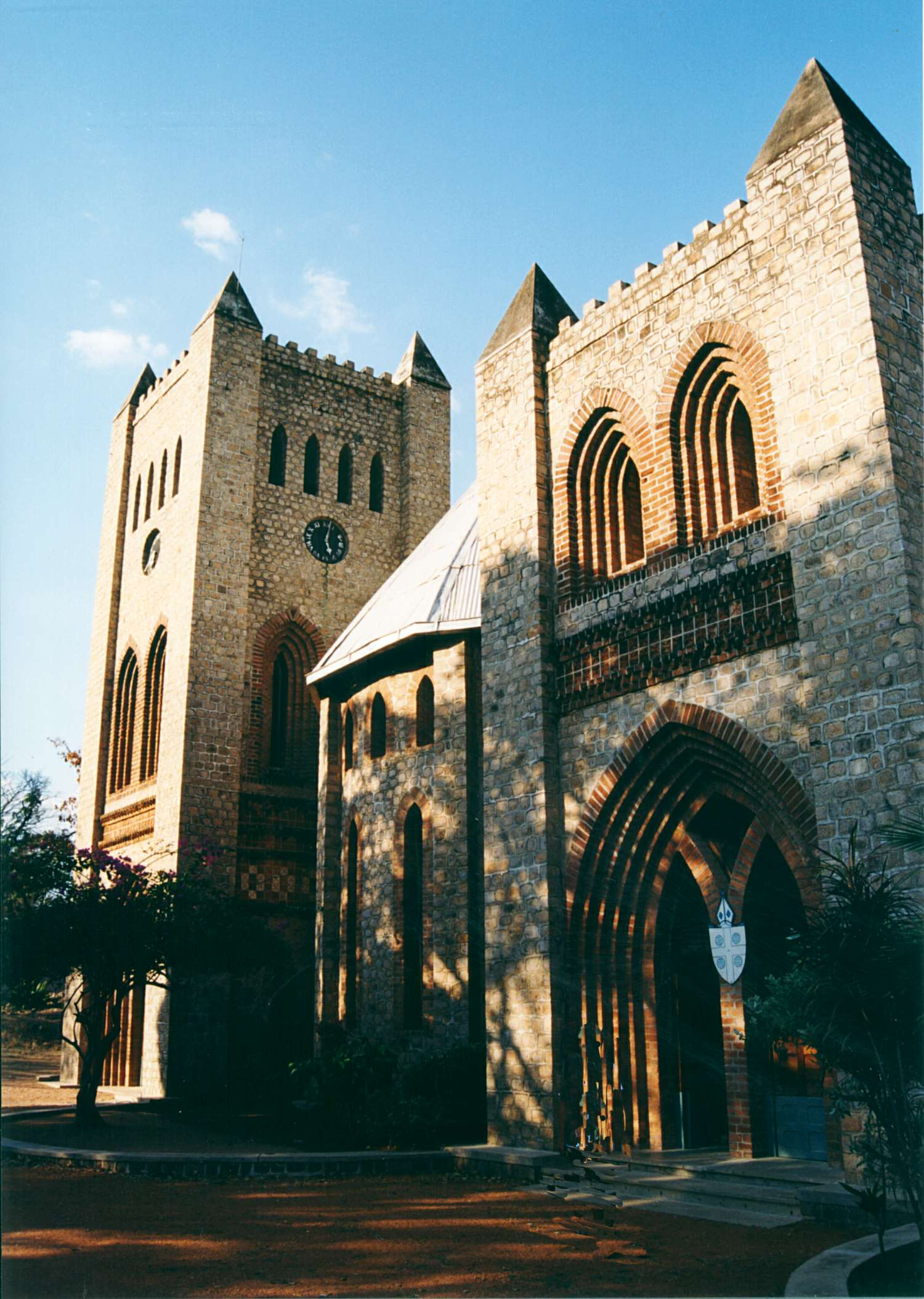
- St Peter's Cathedral
- 12°3′51″S 34°44′16″E
- Location: Likoma
- Country: Malawi
- Denomination: Church of the Province of Central Africa

History
- Dedicated: 29 September 1905
- Consecrated: 14 November 1911

Architecture
- Architect: Frank George
- Architectural type: Gothic Revival
- Groundbreaking: 1903
- Completed: 1911

Specifications
- Length: 320 feet (98 m)
- Width: 85 feet (26 m)
- Materials: Granite, brick

Administration
- Diocese: Northern Malawi
- Archdeaconry: Likoma

Clergy
- Bishop: The Rt. Rev. Fanuel Magangani
- Dean: The Ven. Peterson Binga

St Peter's Cathedral is an Anglican cathedral on the island of Likoma in Lake Malawi. It was founded as a mission station that became the inland African headquarters of the Universities' Mission to Central Africa (UMCA). The cathedral was begun in 1903 and completed in 1911. It became the seat of a diocese whose boundaries and name have shifted over time; today it is the seat of the bishop of Northern Malawi in the Church of the Province of Central Africa. The Gothic Revival cathedral, made largely of granite quarried on Likoma, features a cruciform plan with two towers at the west end and a double-ended apsidal layout inspired by Carolingian and Ottonian churches. The high cathedral style of St Peter's reflected the UMCA's Anglo-Catholic and Tractarian commitments. At 17,600 square feet (1,640 m^{2}), the building was reported by The Guardian to be the third-largest cathedral in Africa as of 2016.

== History ==
=== Early years of missions in Likoma ===
The UMCA was formed by Anglo-Catholics in the Church of England in response to a request by Scottish explorer and physician David Livingstone for Protestant missionaries in Central Africa. After an abortive effort to set up a mission station at the southern end of Lake Nyasa (present-day Lake Malawi), the UMCA established work in Zanzibar. In 1885, as UMCA missionaries resumed efforts to minister around Lake Nyasa, they set up their headquarters on Likoma, using a steamer called the Charles Janson—named after a deceased UMCA missionary—to travel to villages around the lake. Likoma was chosen as the headquarters because its island location was protected from raiders on the mainland, and its harbour provided easy steamer access to mainland villages in the British Central Africa Protectorate and Portuguese Mozambique.

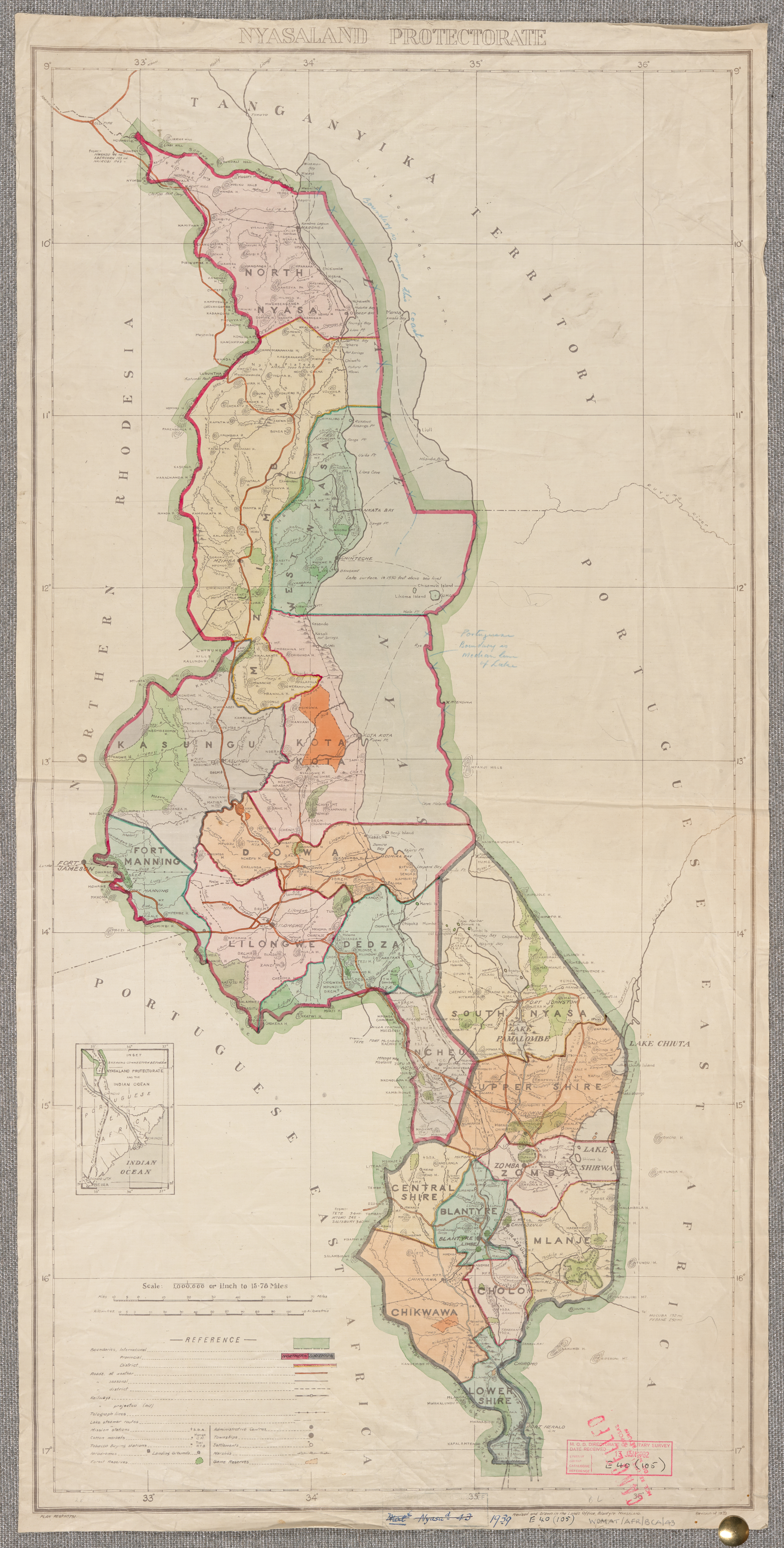
A 1933 map of Nyasaland and Lake Nyasa. Likoma is marked as a UMCA mission site near the eastern shore of the lake in the upper half of the map.

In 1891, Bishop Charles Smythies—having made his fifth and final overland trip from Zanzibar to Likoma—determined that the distance was too far and that a bishop was needed for Lake Nyasa. After fundraising in the United Kingdom, Wilfrid Hornby was consecrated in 1892 as the first bishop of Nyasaland, which would become the name of the future Protectorate of Nyasaland 15 years later. Hornby arrived at Likoma in June 1893 but lasted only eight months before ill health forced him to return to England. His successor, Chauncy Maples, was made a bishop in 1895 but drowned in a storm on the lake shortly after his arrival in September 1895.

=== Construction ===
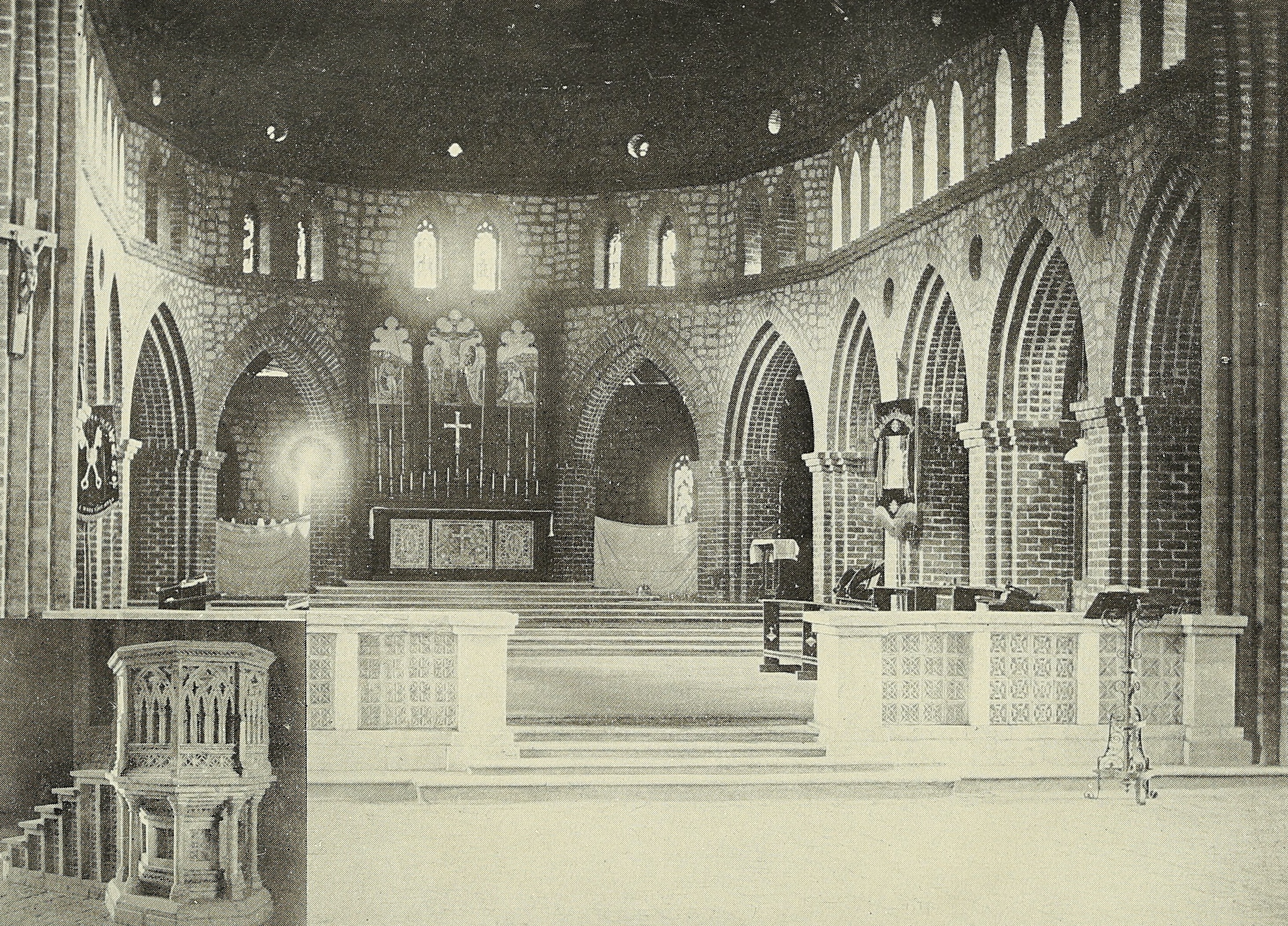
The apsidal choir and carved stone pulpit during construction.

Following Maples, a doctor-priest named John Hine was selected to become bishop of Likoma. He served from 1896 to 1901, and under his episcopacy, architect Frank George arrived in Likoma to manage the rebuilding and expansion of the mission. Working with local masons and carpenters, George designed and supervised the building of churches in Kota Kota on Lake Nyasa, Unangu in Portuguese Mozambique and Korogwe in German East Africa. Under the leadership of Bishop Gerard Trower (1901–1909), they turned to the construction of a large church at Likoma in 1903, laying the foundation stone on 27 June.

The remoteness of Likoma posed a challenge. The only material the island provided for the construction was granite that was quarried on the island. All other construction materials—bricks, lime, wood—were purchased or fabricated on the mainland and ferried over. The mortar was made from soil formed by compacted termite mounds. Due to the expense and lengthy shipping time, almost all materials were sourced in Africa, with the exception of cement, glass and iron for the roof, which came from England. Gifts from England for the church included a carved oak lectern. All the indigenous workers on the site were Christians or catechumens, and each day of work was preceded by a divine service.

Yet incomplete, the church was dedicated on Michaelmas in 1905. Bells were hung and a clock started in the southwest tower in September 1908, but a severe storm that December brought down two buttresses on the towers, necessitating the removal of the clock and chimes. When a third buttress fell in February 1909, the builders decided to reduce the height of the two towers and rearrange the design of the west front.

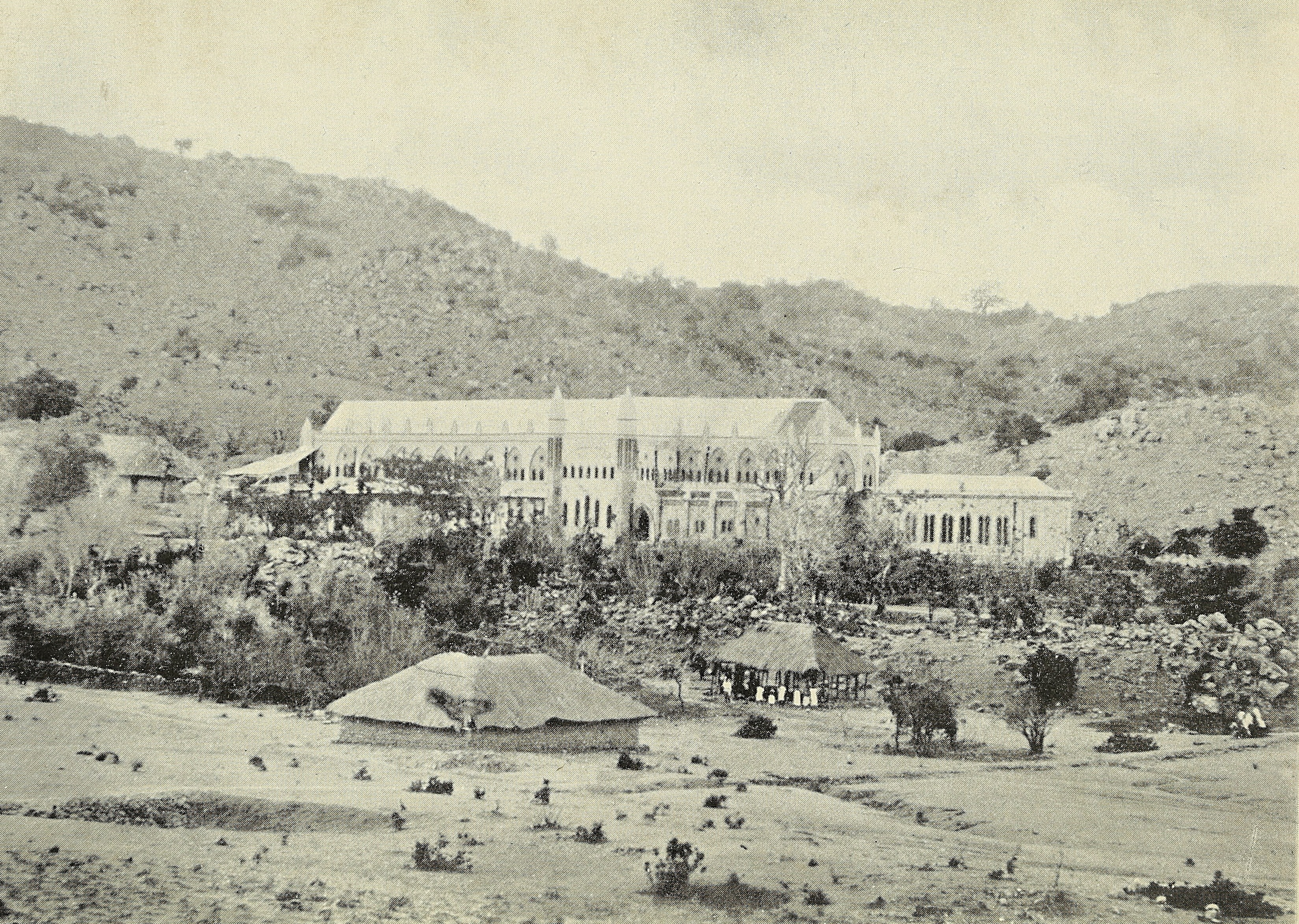
St Peter's Cathedral pictured c. 1909.

April 1909 saw the first ordination of Nyasa clergy, when Leonard Kamungu was ordained a priest and Michael Hamisi and Gilbert Mpalila were made deacons. Trower left that year for a new appointment in Australia and was succeeded by Cathrew Fisher, who arrived in Likoma in 1911. Fisher presided over the consecration of the completed cathedral on 14 November 1911. Former bishop John Hine was the preacher. For the consecration, King George V sent specially bound copies of the Bible and the Book of Common Prayer. The Book of Common Prayer was translated into Chewa by UMCA missionaries in 1897 and expanded in 1909, 1912 and 1926. Starting in 1921, Eucharistic services were offered daily at St Peter's Cathedral in Chewa in reflection of the UMCA's Anglo-Catholic practice.

In 1912, the parapets above the south transept and south wall of the lady chapel collapsed due to severe weather. Frank George returned to Likoma and supervised modifications to the cathedral, including the removal of the parapets all around the church and the extension of the roof to cover the tops of the walls completely and divert water away from the structure. George also supervised the construction of the chapter house at this time. By 1914, Likoma was home to 2,000 indigenous Christians. In the 1920s, the cathedral was believed to be the largest single building in Central Africa.

=== Later history ===
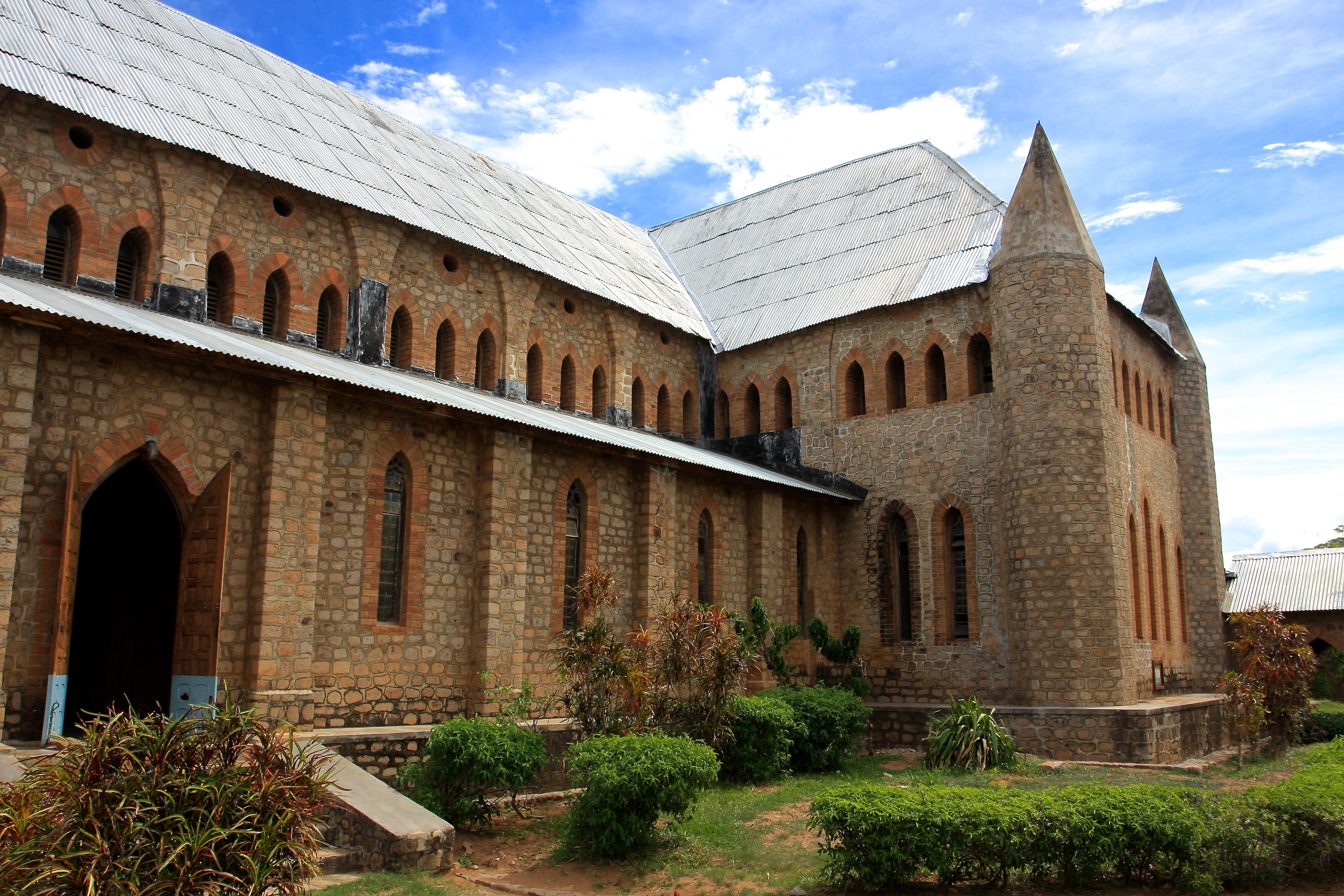
The south side and transept viewed from the cloister.

The cathedral hosted its first episcopal consecration in September 1941 when Robert Selby Taylor was consecrated bishop of Northern Rhodesia. Due to World War II, Taylor was unable to travel back to England, so the Archbishop of Canterbury delegated the consecration duties to a bishop in Africa and Likoma was chosen as the location.

The cathedral's role shifted as Anglicanism grew and institutionalised in Central Africa. In 1952, the Diocese of Nyasaland was divided, with the land on the eastern shore of Lake Malawi closest to Likoma being assigned to the Anglican Diocese of South-West Tanganyika, and in 1959, the territory directly opposite Likoma in present-day Mozambique was moved to the Diocese of Lebombo. These shifts made Likoma more remote from the much of its diocesan territory in present-day Malawi, so Bishop Frank Thorne moved his headquarters to Mponda at the southern end of the lake, although he aimed to be at the cathedral for two months per year. The cathedral was visited by Archbishop of Canterbury Geoffrey Fisher during an African tour in 1955.

According to Bishop Donald Arden, the shorter tower partially collapsed in 1962 and deteriorated further in 1963. He wrote in his memoirs that both towers were demolished in 1968 and rebuilt from 1971 to 1976, when the cathedral was rededicated. During this time, the Diocese of Nyasaland was renamed the Diocese of Malawi in 1964, and split into the Dioceses of Southern Malawi and Lake Malawi in 1971. St Peter's remained the cathedral of the Lake Malawi diocese, although the diocesan headquarters was moved to the less remote mainland locale of Nkhotakota. When the diocese was further divided in 1995, St Peter's remained the cathedral of the Diocese of Northern Malawi, with the diocesan headquarters located on the western shore of the lake in Mzuzu.

== Architecture ==
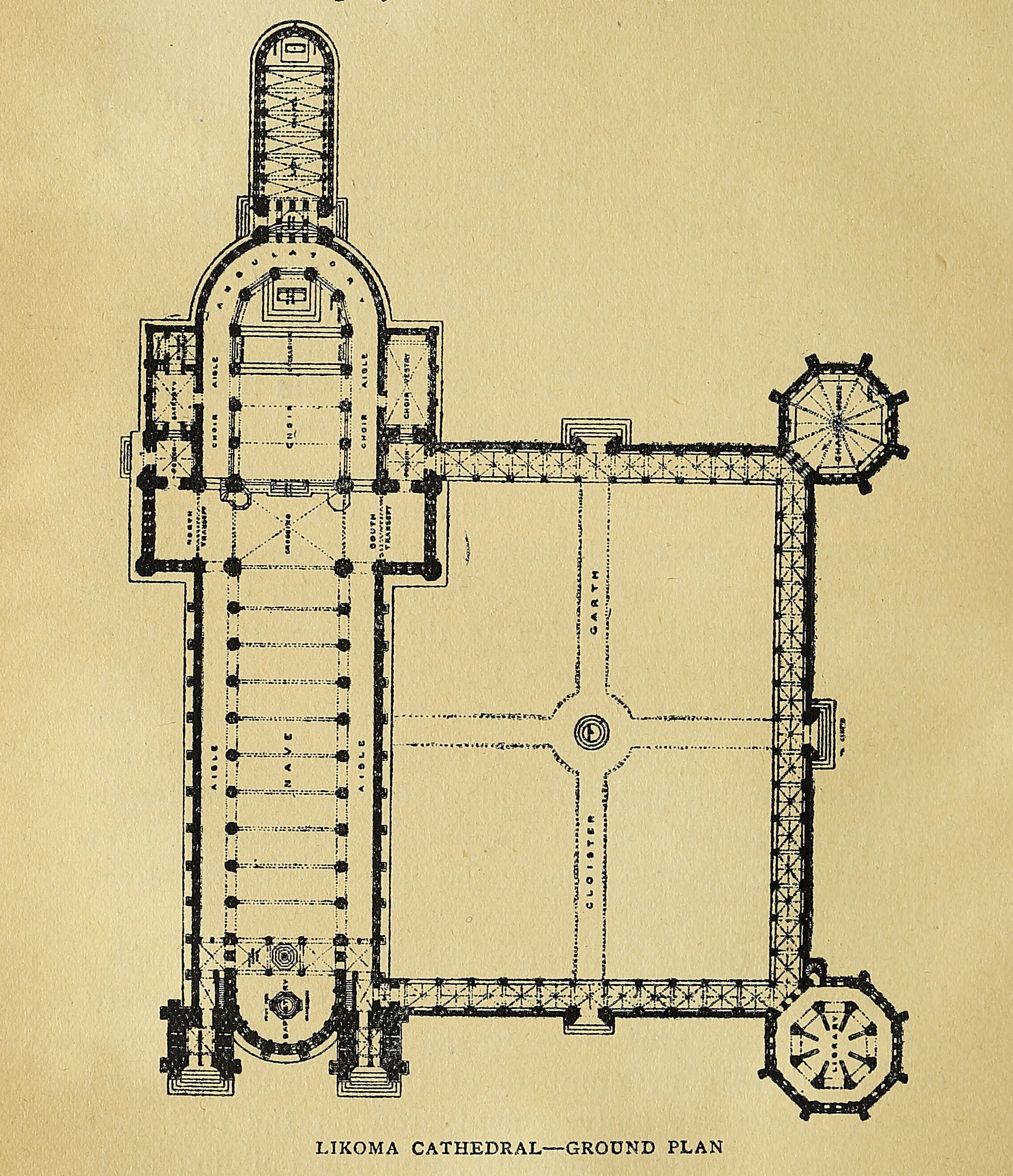
The ground plan of the cathedral. (The east end is at the top of the image.)

The church is laid out on an east-west axis in a cruciform plan. The church covers 17,600 square feet (1,640 m^{2}) and measures 320 feet (98 m) from its west entrance to the east end of the lady chapel. An apsidal baptistery and two towers stand at the west end. The relatively shallow transept, set between a long nave and an apsidal choir surrounded by aisles and an ambulatory, spans 85 feet (26 m) from north to south. To the south of the church is a cloister and adjoining chapter house and library; the combined square footage of the complex is 37,000 square feet (3,400 m^{2}). The double-ended apsidal design is reminiscent of Carolingian and Ottonian churches like St. Michael's Church, Hildesheim, and Maria Laach Abbey. Separate entrances were used for men and women.

The high cathedral style reflected the UMCA's Anglo-Catholic and Tractarian commitments, according to architectural historian G. Alex Bremner, who described the Likoma cathedral as "[p]erhaps the most extraordinary UMCA building." Because of the challenges its missionaries faced, the UMCA reevaluated strategies and improvises, and as a result, Bremner argues, its church buildings "presented a direct challenge to the conventional 'civilizational' approach adopted by most European missions at the time. Instead of focusing on the body, insisting on the need to 'Westernize' the peoples of the African interior, UMCA clergymen emphasized the soul, seeking to instill first and foremost the fundamental precepts of Christianity and, once these had taken root, encouraging the development of a 'native church and ministry.'" Bremner notes that the local production of the cathedral, from its materials to its labourers "bespoke the mission's determination to establish an independent and self-sufficient Negro church in tropical East Africa."
