= Nathaniel Aipa =

Malawian Anglican bishop

The Right Reverend Nathaniel Aipa
- Bishop of Southern Malawi
- Church: Church of the Province of Central Africa
- Diocese: Southern Malawi
- In office: 1987–1996
- Predecessor: Dunstan Ainani
- Successor: James Tengatenga

Orders
- Consecration: 4 January 1987 by Walter Khotso Makhulu

Personal details
- Died: September 1998 Malindi, Malawi
- Denomination: Anglicanism

Benson Nathaniel Aipa (died September 1998) was a Malawian Anglican bishop. He was the third bishop of Southern Malawi in the Church of the Province of Central Africa from 1987 until forced to resign amid scandal in 1996.

== Early life and education ==
Aipa grew up in Malindi and was influenced by early African Anglican priests such as Habil Chipembere. He was one of several priests mentored by Bishop Donald Arden in his quest to raise up more indigenous Malawian priests and eventually bishops for the Anglican church. Arden sent Aipa to St. John's Seminary in Lusaka.

== Ordained ministry ==
After his ordination, Aipa began training additional ordinands in Malawi at the homegrown theological school, first in Mpondas and later Chilema. Early in his career, Aipa was regarded by Arden as a potential episcopal successor, being appointed archdeacon in charge of theological education and eventually vicar general of the newly formed Diocese of Southern Malawi.

In 1981, Aipa was a candidate for diocesan bishop to succeed Arden; suffragan bishop Dunstan Ainani was elected. He continued his studies at the College of the Asension in England.In the mid-1980s, he was again appointed vicar general, and he was elected diocesan bishop after Ainani's resignation in 1986. Church historian Henry Hastings Mbaya has attributed two factors to Aipa's victory: strong political organization of the laity of the diocese and a tribal sense that it was time for Southern Malawian leadership (Ainani was from Nkhotakota in north-central Malawi).

Aipa was consecrated a bishop on 4 January 1987 at Blantyre in the presence of President Hastings Banda. His early episcopacy was marked by a visit from Archbishop of Canterbury Robert Runcie to Blantyre in 1989. Aipa returned the diocese to the Anglo-Catholic ceremonial inherited from the Universities' Mission to Central Africa that Arden and Ainani had downplayed. As bishop, Aipa affected an autocratic and manipulative style, asking to be addressed as "my lord bishop" and requesting that his episcopal ring be kissed as a symbol of subordination. Politically active as bishop, he chaired the Censorship Board during the 1980s.

== Later life ==
Aipa became subject to allegations of financial impropriety and sexual misconduct in the mid-1990s and took a leave of absence in Zambia. He was forced to resign in August 1996, after which he returned to his hometown of Malindi. He died there in September 1998.

Anglican Communion titles
| Preceded by Dunstan Ainani | Bishop of Southern Malawi; 1987–1996 | Succeeded by James Tengatenga |
