= List of cathedrals in Malawi =

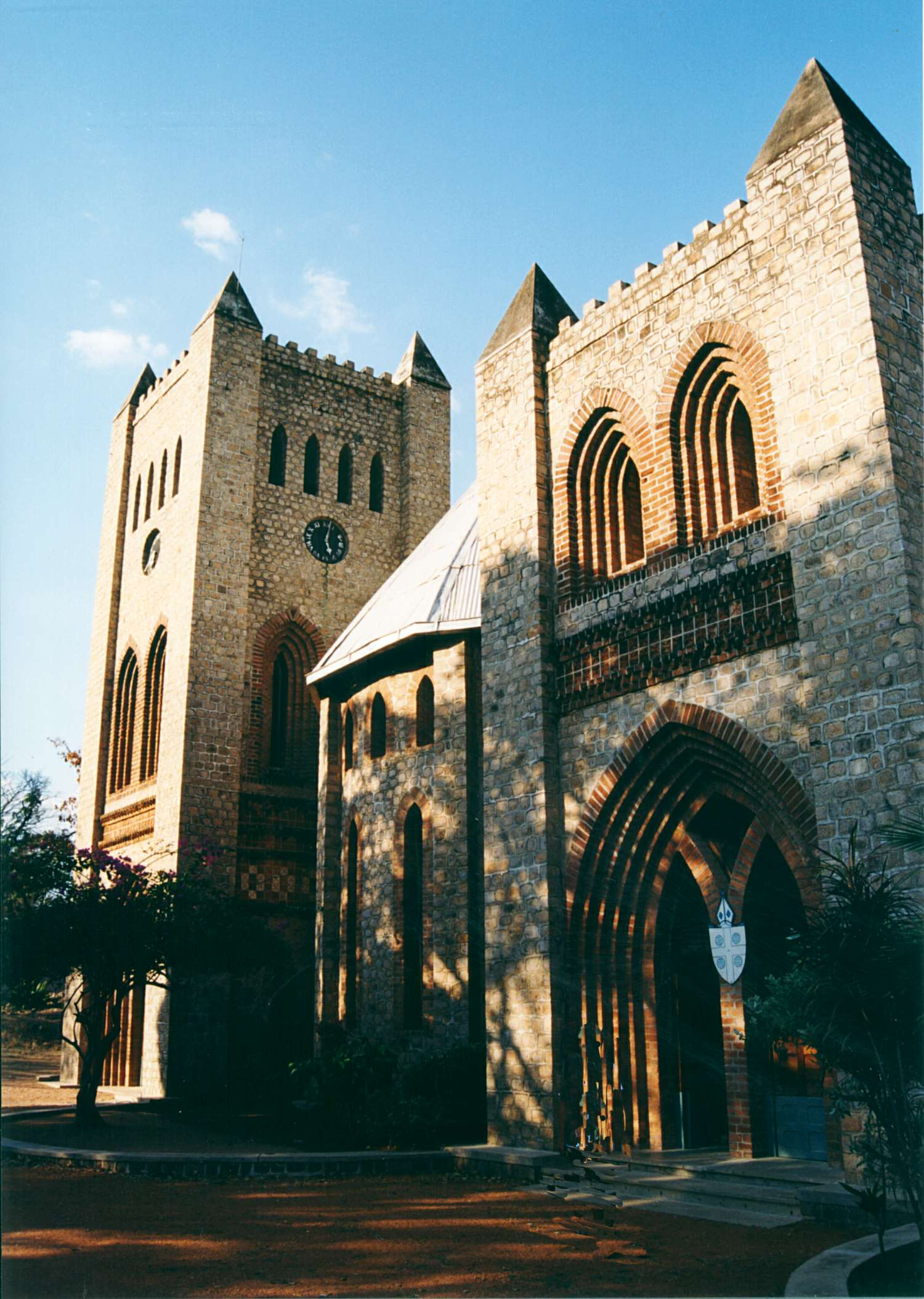
St Peter's Cathedral in Likoma.

This is the list of cathedrals in Malawi sorted by denomination.

== Catholic ==
Cathedrals of the Catholic Church in Malawi:

- Limbe Cathedral of Our Lady in Blantyre
- Cathedral of St. Mary in Karonga
- Maula Cathedral in Lilongwe
- Cathedral of St. Augustine in Mangochi
- St. Peter's Cathedral in Mzuzu
- Cathedral of Zomba

== Anglican ==
Cathedrals of the Church of the Province of Central Africa:

- St Peter's Cathedral in Likoma
- St. Paul's Cathedral in Blantyre

== See also ==
- List of cathedrals
