= St Martin's Hospital =

St Martin's Hospital may refer to:

- St Martin's House, Brisbane, Australia
- St Martin's Hospital, Canterbury, England
- St Martins' Hospital, Malindi, Malawi
