= Kalemba =

Kalemba is a surname with multiple origins. Notable people with this surname include:

- Alinafe Kalemba (born 1967), Malawi Anglican bishop
- Gérard Mulumba Kalemba (1937–2020), Congolese Catholic prelate
- Pascal Kalemba (1979–2012), Congolese footballer
- Stanisław Kalemba (born 1947), Polish politician
- Zane Kalemba (born 1985), American ice hockey player
