= Dunstan Ainani =

Malawian Anglican bishop

The Right Reverend Dunstan Ainani
- Bishop of Southern Malawi
- Church: Church of the Province of Central Africa
- Diocese: Southern Malawi
- In office: 1981–1986
- Predecessor: Donald Arden
- Successor: Nathaniel Aipa
- Previous posts: Suffragan bishop, Diocese of Southern Malawi (1979–1981)

Orders
- Ordination: 1967 (priesthood)
- Consecration: 17 June 1979 by Donald Arden

Personal details
- Born: c. 1919–1925
- Denomination: Anglicanism
- Spouse: Agnes

Dunstan Daniel Ainani (born c. 1920–1925) was a Malawian Anglican bishop and hymnwriter. From 1981 to 1986, he was the bishop of Southern Malawi.

== Early life and ordination ==
Ainani was born c. 1920–1925. (Note: According to The Living Church, Ainani was 58 at the time of his election as suffragan bishop, setting his birth date at 1920 or 1921. According to James Tengatenga, Ainani was "about 60" when he was elected suffragan bishop in 1979. According to church historian Henry Hastings Mbaya, Ainani applied for theological school in 1968 at the age of 43, setting his birth year around 1925.) He came from a Muslim background and served in the King's African Rifles in Rhodesia. He also worked as a storekeeper and clerk and ran a fishing business prior to entering ministry in middle age, in the 1960s, after training as a lay catechist in the Anglican church at Mpondas, Mangochi District. Under the leadership of Bishop Donald Arden, Ainani composed and popularized indigenous Malawian hymns.

== Episcopacy ==
In 1979, Ainani was elected suffragan bishop of the Diocese of Southern Malawi. He was consecrated a bishop at Chilema, Malosa on 17 June 1979. In 1980, Arden was set to retire as diocesan bishop, and Ainani won the election to succeed him on the first ballot, outpacing future bishops Bernard Malango and Nathaniel Aipa. Ainani was considered the presumptive favorite due to his prior service as suffragan bishop. He was enthroned on 26 April 1981 in Malosa.

As bishop, Ainani continued Arden's work of erecting churches, schools, clinics and rectories for the growing diocese. He also followed Arden's evangelical churchmanship, which contrasted with the Anglo-Catholicism of the former Universities' Mission to Central Africa churches in northern Malawi. However, unlike Arden, who translated English Anglican hymns into Chewa, Ainani composed original hymns in Chewa set to popular Malawian tunes. According to church historian Henry Hastings Mbaya, Ainani's hymns outpaced Arden's in popularity and were eventually incorporated into a new Malawian prayer book and hymnal.

The second half of Ainani's episcopate was dominated by a conflict with his diocesan secretary, Andrew Hamisi. Hamisi accused Ainani of "incompetence and maladministration," while Ainani viewed Hamisi as insubordinate. Both parties traded accusations of financial impropriety. Eventually, Ainani fired Hamisi and the conflict came to a head in 1986 with a diocesan standing committee meeting at St. Paul's Cathedral in Blantyre attended by other bishops of the Province of Central Africa. Archbishop Walter Khotso Makhulu prevailed upon Ainani to retire, which he did by the end of 1986.

== Later life ==
After retirement, Ainani relocated to his home region of Sani, Nkhotakota, where he died a few years later. He was married and had eight children and, at the time of his election as suffragan bishop, six grandchildren. Ainani's widow, Agnes, reached the age of 93 before her death in 2020.

== Notes ==
Anglican Communion titles
Preceded by Donald Arden	Bishop of Southern Malawi; 1981–1986	Succeeded by Nathaniel Aipa
