= Jerry Douglas (disambiguation) =

Jerry Douglas (born 1956) is an American country and bluegrass musician.

Jerry Douglas may also refer to:

- Jerry Douglas (actor) (1932–2021), American television and film actor
- Jerry Douglas (director) (1935–2021), American director and writer of adult films

== See also ==
- Gerald Douglas
