= Anne Bayley =

English surgeon (1934–2024)

The Reverend Anne Bayley OBE FRCS FRCSEd (Hon)
- Born: 31 May 1934; Watford, Hertfordshire, England
- Died: 31 December 2024 (aged 90); Lingfield, Surrey, England
- Education: Girton College, Cambridge, Middlesex Hospital Medical School
- Occupations: Surgeon, Anglican priest, author
- Years active: 1968–2019
- Known for: Theorising heterosexual transmission of HIV, development of surgery education in Zambia
- Medical career
- Field: Surgical oncology
- Institutions: University of Zambia School of Medicine
- Research: HIV/AIDS

Anne Christine Bayley (31 May 1934 – 31 December 2024) was an English surgeon. She was appointed an Officer of the Order of the British Empire in 1985 for her research into HIV/AIDS patients in Zambia and for documenting the spread of the disease among heterosexual patients in Africa. In addition to her clinical work, she was a lecturer and head of the surgery department at the University of Zambia School of Medicine. In the 1990s, she returned to England, where she was ordained as an Anglican priest. She continued to be active in Africa throughout her retirement years.

== Early life and medical training ==
Anne Bayley was born on 31 May 1934 in Watford to Roydon and Kathleen Bayley (née While) and had two younger siblings. She was a Christian from her youth and experienced a call to the priesthood that she was unable to pursue in the Church of England at the time. She took her medical degree at Girton College, Cambridge, and completed her clinical training at Middlesex Hospital Medical School in 1958.

She first went to Northern Rhodesia (modern-day Zambia) in 1961, where she practised at a mission hospital in Katete. She was often the sole doctor at the hospital and was called on to perform operations she had never done before. Bayley returned to the United Kingdom and was awarded her surgical fellowship, specializing in oncology, in 1968. She worked in Korle-Bu Teaching Hospital in Accra, Ghana, from 1968 to 1970, and it was during her time in Ghana that she became a surrogate mother to an eight-year-old girl named Faustina, including helping her attend school in Yorkshire.

== HIV/AIDS treatment and research ==
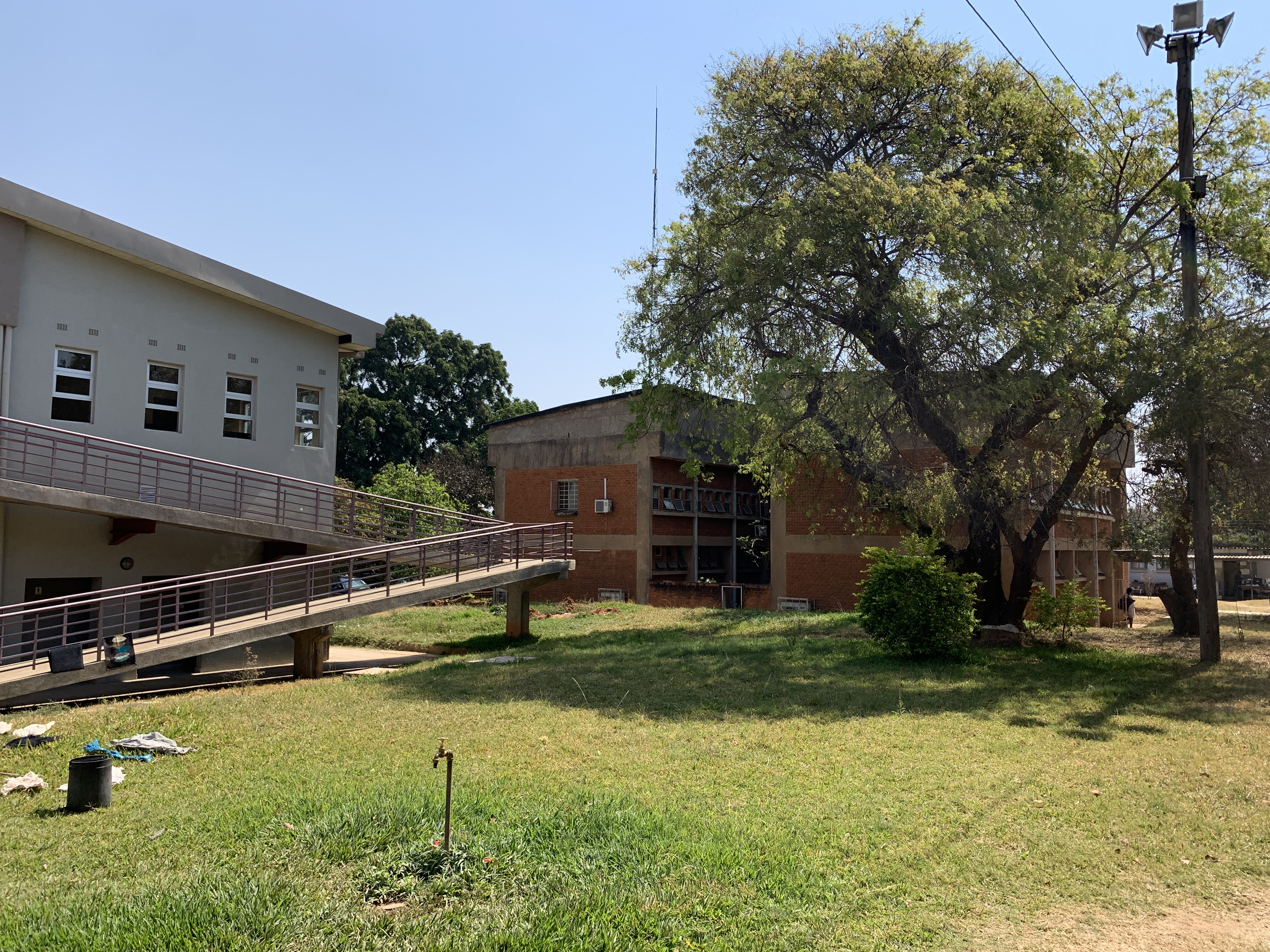
University of Zambia School of Medicine

Bayley returned to Zambia in 1971 and worked in the department of surgery at the University of Zambia School of Medicine until 1990, eventually being appointed professor and serving as head of the department. Among other topics, her early publications covered the treatment of hepatocellular carcinoma.

In 1983, while running a clinic for those with Kaposi's sarcoma (KS), a disease mainly afflicting older men, she observed a doubling in new cases of KS, and with 13 (about half) of the patients presenting with a more aggressive form of the condition. Of the 13 (which included three women), eight were dead in less than a year. Bayley asked her male patients if they had ever had sex with men; most denied it. Blood tests showed the patients with the aggressive form of KS had the same immunodeficiency seen in American AIDS patients. As a result, she theorised that HIV was being spread by heterosexual intercourse, contrary to the prevailing view that it was transmitted through sex between men and blood transfusions.

When an HIV antibody test became available in 1984, Bayley sent samples from her patients off for testing. The tests showed that nearly all of her patients with the aggressive form of KS were also HIV-positive. According to her obituarists in the British Medical Journal, "Bayley's clinical reports resulted in the US Centers for Disease Control sending a team to Lusaka, leading to the recognition of heterosexual transmission of HIV." For this discovery, she was made an officer of the Order of the British Empire in 1985.

Bayley's research and clinical reports contributed to growing awareness of the prevalence of HIV/AIDS in Africa. In 1985, she and her colleagues carried out an impromptu study of patients in the epicentre of AIDS—observing an array of symptoms that included swollen lymph notes, thrush, enlarged tonsils and "a red wet soggy throat, like a schoolchild with a viral infection"—in Uganda and estimated that 29 of 109 patients evaluated had HIV. All 29 later tested positive for the virus. In addition to her clinical work, Bayley led efforts to raise awareness in Africa about the prevention of HIV transmission. Meanwhile, she helped to establish the University of Zambia's first postgraduate programme for surgical training. She was also the first female president of the Association of Surgeons of East Africa. For her contributions to the development of surgical training in Zambia, she was granted an honorary fellowship of the Royal College of Surgeons of Edinburgh in 1986.

== Later life ==
Bayley returned to England in 1990 to study for ordination to the priesthood. She was ordained to the priesthood in 1994 and served churches in Wembley, Yorkshire and Herefordshire. As part-time clergy, she continued to visit Africa, working with the AIDS committees of Africa's Anglican churches and developing resources to help churches in Zambia and Malawi prevent HIV transmission within marriages. She also advocated for improvements in permaculture to address related problems of hunger. Her books published in this period include One New Humanity: The Challenge of AIDS (1996), Time to Talk: Guide to Family Life in the Age of AIDS (2006, with James Tengatenga) and More and Better Food: Farming, Climate Change, Health, and the AIDS Epidemic (2011, with Mugove Nyika).

As her health declined, Bayley moved into a retirement home for priests in 2019. She died on New Year's Eve of 2024 at the age of 90. She left her archive on AIDS and oncology to the Wellcome Trust.

== Selected bibliography ==
=== Books ===
- Bayley, Anne (1996). One New Humanity: The Challenge of AIDS. SPCK. ISBN 978-0-281-04923-3.
- Tengatenga, James; Bayley, Anne (2006). Time to talk: A guide to family life in the age of AIDS. Oxford: Strategies for Hope Trust. ISBN 978-1-905746-31-6.
- Strange, Tracey; Bayley, Anne (2008). OECD Insights Sustainable Development Linking Economy, Society, Environment: Linking Economy, Society, Environment. OECD Publishing. ISBN 978-92-64-05574-2.
- Bayley, Anne; Nyika, Mugove Walter (2013). More and Better Food: Farming, Climate Change, Health and the AIDS Epidemic. Strategies for Hope Trust. ISBN 978-1-905746-16-3.

=== Articles ===
- Bayley, A C (15 May 1971). "Buruli ulcer in Ghana". BMJ. 2 (5758). BMJ: 401–402. doi:10.1136/bmj.2.5758.401-c. ISSN 0959-8138. PMC 1795769.
- Vogel, Charles L.; Bayley, Anne C.; Brooker, Reginald J.; Anthony, Peter P.; Ziegler, John L. (1977). "A phase II study of adriamycin (NSC 123127) in patients with hepatocellular carcinoma from Zambia and the United States". Cancer. 39 (5): 1923–1929. doi:10.1002/1097-0142(197705)39:5<1923::AID-CNCR2820390502>3.0.CO;2-2. ISSN 0008-543X.
- Bayley, A.C.; Cheingsong-Popov, R.; Dalgleish, A.G.; Downing, R.G.; Tedder, R.S.; Weiss, R.A. (1985). "HTLV-III SEROLOGY DISTINGUISHES ATYPICAL AND ENDEMIC KAPOSI'S SARCOMA IN AFRICA". The Lancet. 325 (8425). Elsevier BV: 359–361. doi:10.1016/s0140-6736(85)91383-2. ISSN 0140-6736.
- Melbye, Mads; Bayley, Anne; Manuwele, J.K.; Clayden, SusanA.; Blattner, WilliamA.; Tedder, Richard; Njelesani, E.K.; Mukelabai, K.; Bowa, F.J.; Levin, Arthur; Weiss, RobinA.; Biggar, RobertJ. (1986). "EVIDENCE FOR HETEROSEXUAL TRANSMISSION AND CLINICAL MANIFESTATIONS OF HUMAN IMMUNODEFICIENCY VIRUS INFECTION AND RELATED CONDITIONS IN LUSAKA, ZAMBIA". The Lancet. 328 (8516). Elsevier BV: 1113–1115. doi:10.1016/s0140-6736(86)90527-1. ISSN 0140-6736.
- Tabor, Edward; Gerety, Robert J.; Cairns, James; Bayley, Anne C. (1990). "Antibody responses of adults, adolescents, and children to a plasma‐derived hepatitis B vaccine in a rural African setting". Journal of Medical Virology. 32 (2): 134–138. doi:10.1002/jmv.1890320212. ISSN 0146-6615.
- Gerety, Robert J.; Tabor, Edward; Bayley, Anne C. (8 August 1990). "Did HIV and HTLV Originate in Africa?". JAMA: The Journal of the American Medical Association. 264 (6). American Medical Association (AMA): 691. doi:10.1001/jama.1990.03450060037012. ISSN 0098-7484.
- Tabor, Edward; Cairns, James; Gerety, Robert J.; Bayley, Anne C. (1993). "Nine‐year follow‐up study of a plasma‐derived hepatitis B vaccine in a rural African setting". Journal of Medical Virology. 40 (3): 204–209. doi:10.1002/jmv.1890400307. ISSN 0146-6615.
- Bayley, Anne (2000). "Narrowing the gap". Journal of Medical Ethics. 26 (1). BMJ: 51–53. doi:10.1136/jme.26.1.51. ISSN 0306-6800. PMC 1733158.
