= Gerard Trower =

Anglican bishop of the north-west of Western Australia (1860–1928)

Gerard Trower (3 December 1860 – 25 August 1928) was an Anglican bishop.

Bishop Gerard Trower

== Early life ==
Trower was born in Hook, Yorkshire, the son of the Rev Arthur Trower (1819 – 1891) and Jane Lawford. His father's cousins included Bishop Walter Trower (1804 – 1877) and Charles Francis Trower (1817 – 1891). He was educated at Merchant Taylors' School, Northwood and Keble College, Oxford. He graduated with a BA in 1885 and an MA in 1888.

== Church career ==
He was made a deacon in 1888 and ordained priest in 1889 by the Bishop of Worcester. His first position was as a curate in Birmingham at St Alban's, Bordesley. This was followed by a curacy at St Mary Redcliffe, Bristol, where he was curate-in-charge of the mission district. He then emigrated to Australia where he became rector of Christ Church St Laurence in 1895.

Trower's appointment to Christ Church caused controversy in the predominantly evangelical Diocese of Sydney as it was made without reference to the diocesan nominators after the parochial nominators had consulted Fr R. L. Page, superior of the Cowley Fathers in Oxford. During his short term as rector, a Sung Eucharist became the rule for Sundays and the parish acquired several sets of vestments. The church became open all day for private prayer, while more free pews (not rented) were set aside for the poor. Trower had a whimsical sense of humour which he often displayed at public gatherings. During one synod debate on church ritual he pointed out that candles, when used to beautify a church, were no different to vegetables decorating a harvest festival, adding "so, if you blow out our lights, we'll blow out your flowers and vegetables".

While on a visit to England, in 1900, he resigned to take up an appointment as Bishop of Likoma in northern Malawi. His former parishioners at Christ Church St Laurence gave him a gold pectoral cross, and he received the honorary degree Doctor of Divinity (DD) from the University of Oxford. He was consecrated as Bishop of Likoma by the Archbishop of Canterbury, Frederick Temple, in Westminster Abbey, on 25 January 1902, and arrived in his diocese later that year.

The bishopric of Likoma in Nyasaland (now Malawi) was part of the Universities' Mission to Central Africa, started at the suggestion of David Livingstone. Trower laid the foundations of a cathedral (dedicated in the name of St Peter) on Likoma Island in Lake Nyasa in January 1903 and he dedicated the building for worship in 1905. He also founded the theological college at Nkwazi in 1905. In 1908, he secured from the Archbishop of Canterbury a change in his See's name from Likoma back to Nyasaland.

Trower left Likoma in 1910 to take up the oversight of the new Diocese of North West Australia on the insistence of an old friend, Charles Riley, the Bishop of Perth. In September 1925, he ordained James Noble, the first Australian Aboriginal person to be made a deacon of the Anglican Church. After 17 years in North West Australia, Trower retired to Chale, Isle of Wight, where he died in 1928.

Anglican Communion titles
Preceded by John Hine	Bishop of Likoma (until 1908); Bishop of Nyasaland (from 1908); 1901– 1910	Succeeded by Cathrew Fisher
New office	Bishop of North West Australia; 1910–1927	Succeeded by John Frewer
