= Likoma, Malawi =

Likoma
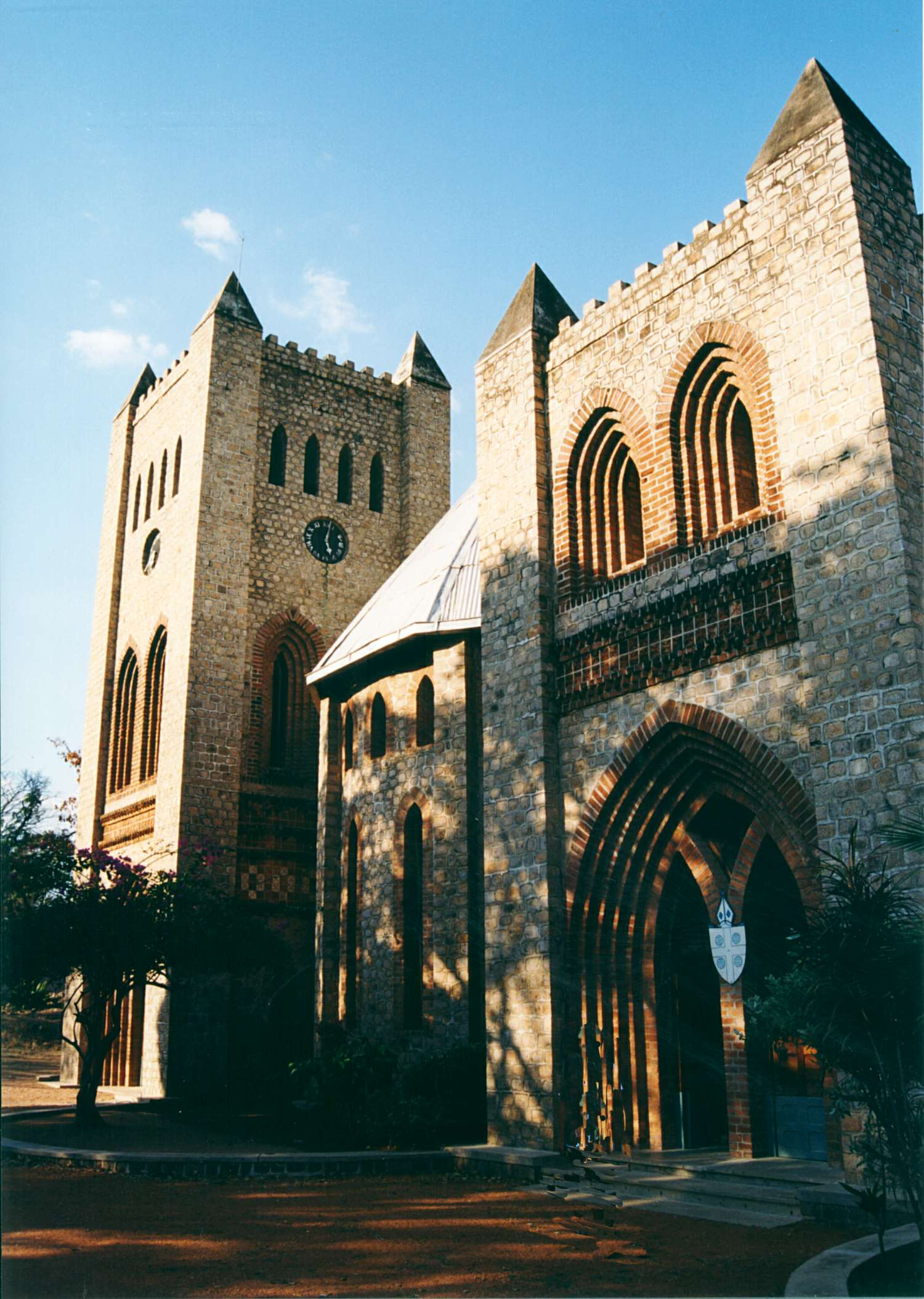
- St Peter's Cathedral Church

- Location within Malawi
- Coordinates: 12°4′0″S 34°44′0″E
- Country: Malawi
- Region: Northern Region
- District: Likoma
- Time zone: UTC+2 (CAT)

Likoma is the main town on Likoma Island in Malawi. It is the administrative capital of Likoma District.

== Description ==
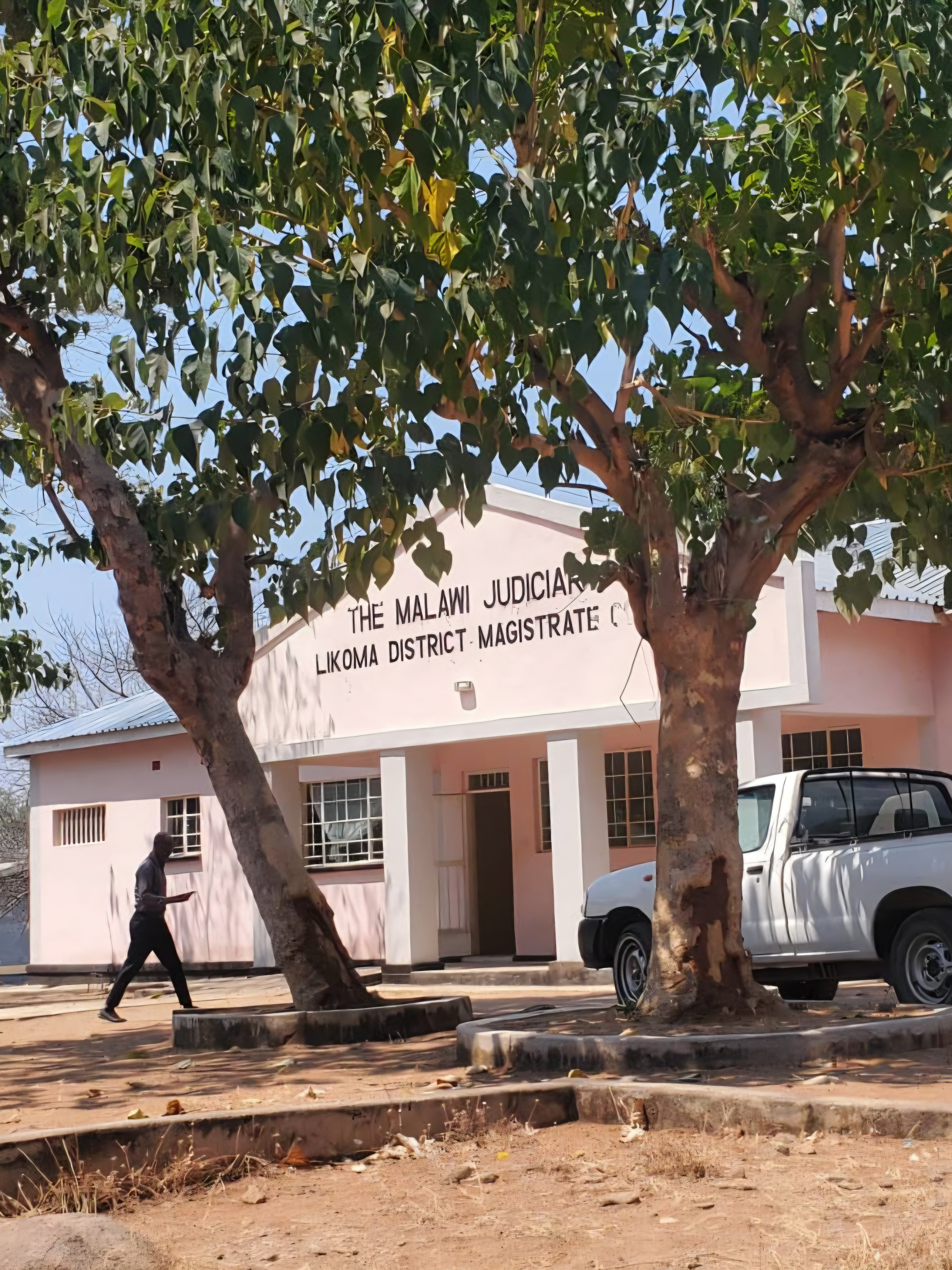
Likoma District Magistrate Court

Likoma's magistrates court was established in 1999 and this was a substantial improvement as before then the closest justice was at the magistrate's court at Nkhata Bay. This meant a long boat trip and a week away before the people could return to the islands.

The European Union had funded the refurbishment of the magistrates court and this was completed in 2022.

Perhaps the most famous attraction of Likoma is the Anglican cathedral of Likoma. The cathedral is dedicated to Saint Peter, whose statue faces Lake Malawi. The cathedral was built mostly with stones. The foundation stone of the cathedral was laid by Bishop Gerard Trower on 27 January 1903 and was consecrated by Bishop Thomas Cathrew Fisher on 14 November 1911. Considered a feat of engineering, materials for its construction were imported from many countries. It is the seat of the bishop of the Diocese of Northern Malawi in the Church of the Province of Central Africa.
