= Diocese of Nyasaland =

Former Anglican diocese in present-day Malawi

Anglican
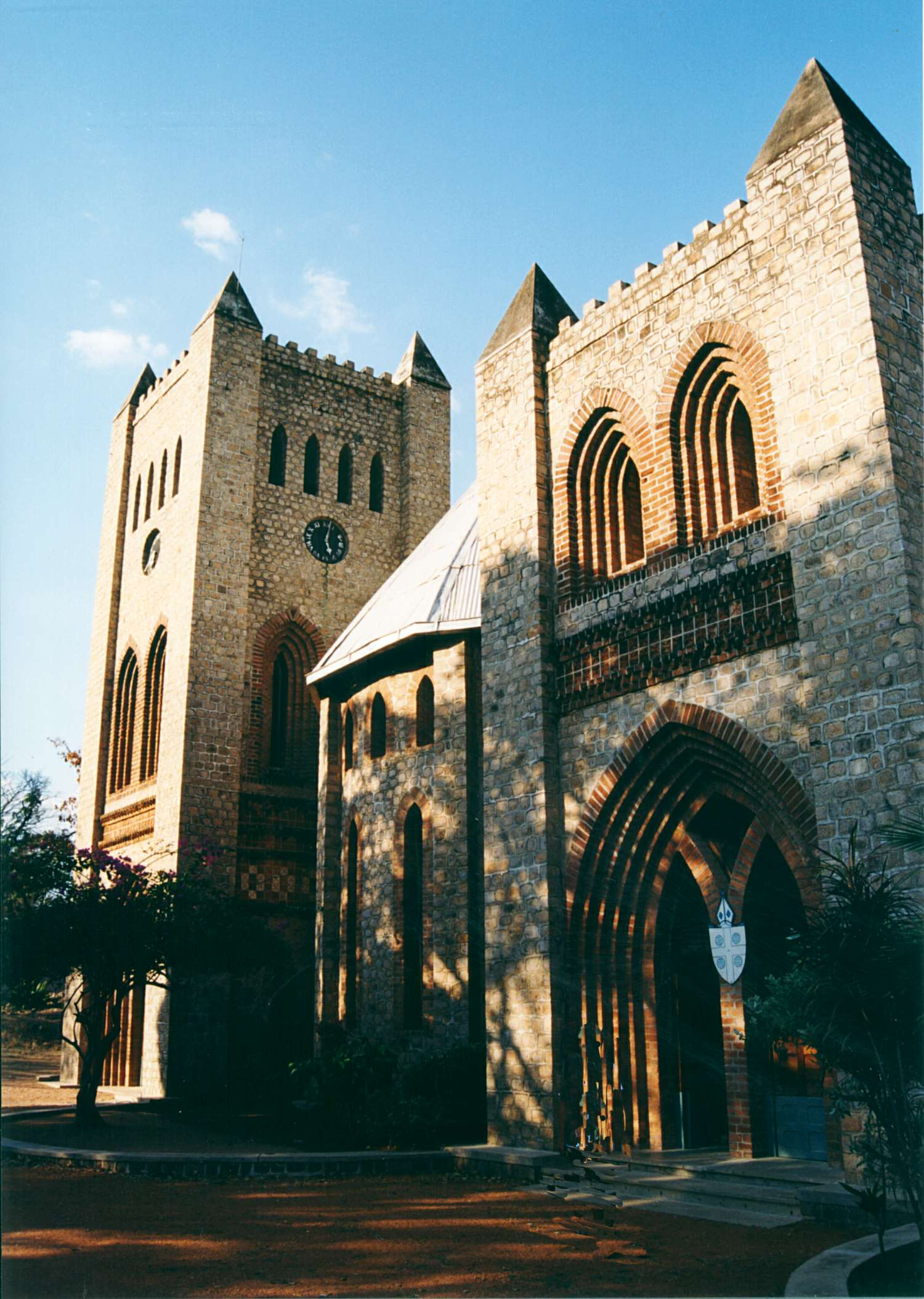
- St Peter's Cathedral in Likoma

Location
- Territory: Nyasaland, Malawi
- Ecclesiastical province: Church of the Province of Central Africa (after 1954)
- Metropolitan: Archbishop of Central Africa (after 1954)

Information
- Denomination: Anglicanism
- Established: 1892
- Dissolved: 1971
- Cathedral: St Peter's Cathedral, Likoma

The Diocese of Nyasaland (known as the Diocese of Malawi from 1964 to 1971) was an Anglican diocese in Central Africa centered on Lake Malawi. Growing out of the missionary activity of David Livingstone and the Universities' Mission to Central Africa, it officially became a diocese with the appointment of a bishop of Nyasaland in 1892. Its territory narrowed to the boundaries of present-day Malawi over time with the development of Anglicanism in Africa, and it remained a diocese until being divided between the Diocese of Lake Malawi and the Diocese of Southern Malawi in 1971. Headquartered at St Peter's Cathedral on Likoma Island, the bishop of Nyasaland was at times known as the Bishop of Likoma.

== Bishops ==
1. Wilfrid Hornby (1892–1894)
2. Chauncy Maples (1895) (as bishop of Likoma)
3. John Hine (1896–1901) (as bishop of Likoma)
4. Gerard Trower (1901–1910) (as bishop of Likoma to 1908)
5. Cathrew Fisher (1910–1929)
6. Gerald Douglas (1930–1934)
7. Frank Thorne (1936–1961)
8. Donald Arden (1961–1971) (as bishop of Malawi from 1964)

== See also ==
- Universities' Mission to Central Africa
- Church of the Province of Central Africa
