= Diocese of Southern Malawi =

Malawian diocese of the Church of the Province of Central Africa

Location
- Country: Malawi
- Ecclesiastical province: Central Africa

Information
- Rite: Anglican
- Established: 1971
- Cathedral: St Paul's Cathedral, Blantyre

Current leadership
- Bishop: Alinafe Kalemba

Map
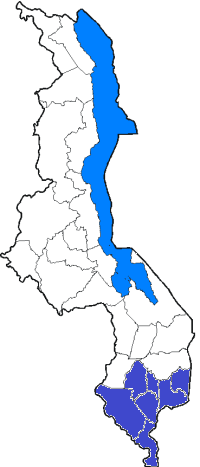
- Location of the diocese within Malawi

The Diocese of Southerm Malawi is a diocese of the Anglican Church of the Province of Central Africa. One of the church's four dioceses in Malawi, it was formed in 1971 when the Diocese of Malawi split into the Diocese of Lake Malawi and the Diocese of Southern Malawi. Today it covers the southern quarter of the country, and its see city is Blantyre.

== History ==
Anglicanism in Malawi dates back to the 19th century and the missionary activity of David Livingstone and the Universities' Mission to Central Africa. It took organizational form in 1892, when the first bishop of Nyasaland was appointed with his see on Likoma Island, where St Peter's Cathedral was completed in 1911. Over the course of the 20th century, the diocese's territory narrowed to the boundaries of present-day Malawi. In 1971, the diocese was divided between the Diocese of Lake Malawi (based at Likoma) and the Diocese of Southern Malawi. Bishop of Malawi Donald Arden became the first bishop of Southern Malawi.

Arden was succeeded by Dunstan Ainani, who had been made a suffragan bishop in 1979, and under indigenous Malawian leadership the diocese became more representative. Synods began to conduct business in Chewa, lay participation and women's participation in governance rose, and worship began to include locally composed hymns set to Malawian tunes. Partnerships with the Anglican Diocese of Birmingham continued during the 1970s and 1980s. During the 1980s, the diocese had a partnership with the Episcopal Diocese of Texas and the (at the time) evangelical Episcopal Diocese of Colorado. Priests Gerry Schnackenberg and John Wengrovius came from Colorado to serve as training chaplain to schools and colleges and a teacher at Zomba Theological College, respectively.

The diocese experienced a leadership crisis during the 1990s under Bishop Nathaniel Aipa over concerns about the deployment and transparency of diocesan funds, as well as allegations of sexual impropriety on the part of the bishop. Aipa resigned in 1996 and was replaced by James Tengatenga in 1998. Under Tengatenga, the diocese focused on the crisis of HIV/AIDS in Malawi, starting workshops for clergy and lay leaders to promote AIDS education, advocate against casual sex and sexual exploitation and promote the use of contraception. In 2002, the diocese split, with the northern area forming the Diocese of Upper Shire. Much of the diocese's infrastructure, including the diocesan headquarters and bishop's residence in Malosa, went to the Upper Shire diocese. Tengatenga moved to Blantyre to establish a new headquarters and open new schools.

== Bishops ==
No.	Name	Dates	Notes
1	Donald Arden	1971–1981	Previously bishop of Malawi; also Archbishop of Central Africa
2	Dunstan Ainani	1981–1987	Previously suffragan bishop of Malawi
3	Nathaniel Aipa	1987–1996	
4	James Tengatenga	1998–2013	Chair of the Anglican Consultative Council, 2009–2016
5	Alinafe Kalemba	2013–present	

== Companion diocese and partnerships ==
The Diocese of Birmingham in the Church of England
(United States) The Diocese of Texas in the Episcopal Church
