= Alston May =

English Anglican bishop (1869–1940)

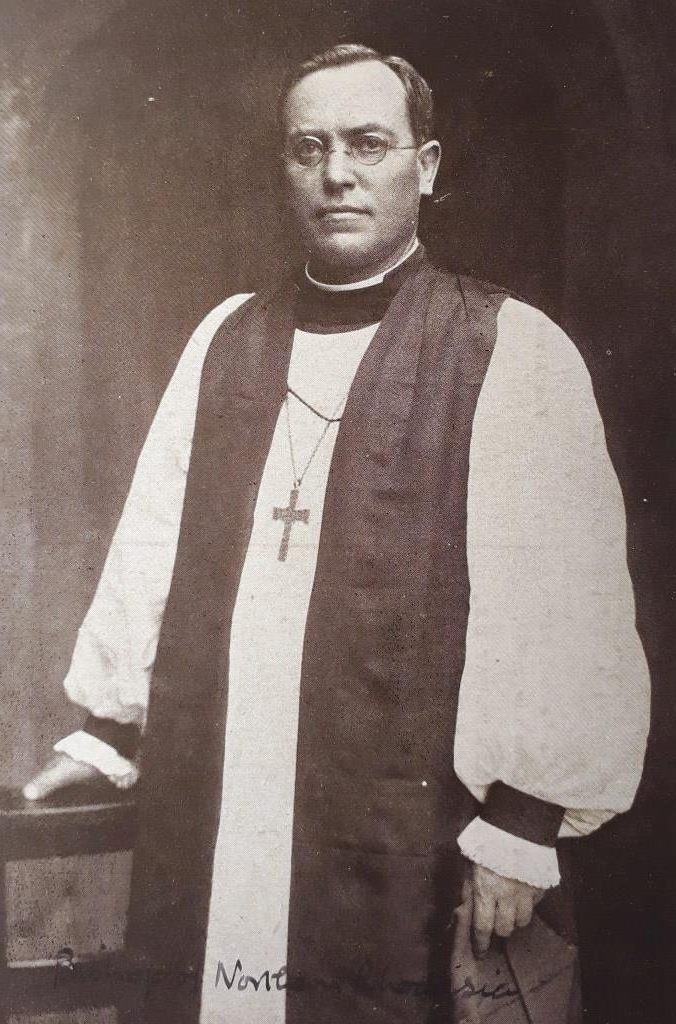
Alston May, Second Bishop of Northern Rhodesia (1914–1940)

Alston James Weller May was an Anglican bishop in the first half of the 20th century.

He was born in 1869 and educated at Leeds Grammar School and Oriel College, Oxford . After a period of study at Ripon College Cuddesdon he was ordained in 1894. His first posts were curacies at All Souls, Leeds and St Mark, Portsmouth following which he was Curate in Charge of St Peter's, Chertsey. In 1914 he was appointed the 2nd Bishop of Northern Rhodesia, a post he held until his death on 17 July 1940.

== Notes ==
Religious titles
Preceded by John Hine	Bishop of Northern Rhodesia; 1914–1940	Succeeded by Robert Selby Taylor
