= St Martins' Hospital, Malindi =

Coordinates: 14°19′13″S 35°16′45″E

Geography
- Location: Malindi, Mangochi District, Southern Region, Malawi

Organisation
- Care system: Missionary
- Type: Community

Services
- Beds: 100

History
- Founded: July 1, 1898; 128 years ago

Links
- Website: here
- Other links: Hospitals in Malawi

St Martins' Hospital, Malindi, is a 100-bed missionary community hospital in the town of Malindi, Malawi.

== Location ==
The hospital is located in Malindi, a town in Mangochi District, in the Southern Region of Malawi. Malindi is located approximately 24 kilometres (15 mi), by road, north of Mangochi, where the district headquarters are located. This is about 215 kilometres (134 mi), by road, north of Blantyre, the largest city in Malawi's Southern Region.

== Overview ==
This hospital is under the jurisdiction of the Lakeshore Health Department of the Diocese of Southern Malawi–Upper Shire, a component of the Church of the Province of Central Africa.

St Martin’s caters to a population of approximately 40,000 people in Malindi and neighboring settlements. In addition to the hospital facilities, a mobile medical unit is available to take services to needy, distant communities.

The hospital has the following departments

- Maternity Ward
- Pediatric Ward
- Male Ward
- Female Ward
- Outpatient Department
- Operating Theatre (out of action).

== History ==
The hospital was founded in 1898, as a clinic, staffed by one nurse, who cared for sick missionaries and their families. Over the next five years the hospital expanded enough so that it could accommodate 305 patients per month.

By 2014, the bed capacity had increased to 50 and although there was no doctor, there were five capable clinical officers and a team of nurses and patient assistants, who kept the hospital in motion. The hospital runs a daily antiretroviral clinic, as well as regular antenatal, family planning, and vaccination clinics. The operating room is used for caesarean sections, female sterilizations, hernia repairs, and incision and drainage operations.

As of November 2018, the hospital had grown to 100 in-patient beds. There is currently no doctor at this hospital and it is instead run by the two Clinical Officers Mr Peter Moffat and Mr Harvey Likapa.

In January 2025 a tree fell and damaged the building. The National Bank of Malawi donated 15m Kwacha to repair and renovate the children's ward.

== See also ==
- List of hospitals in Malawi
