= Gerald Douglas =

Malawian Anglican bishop

Gerald Wybergh Douglas (17 June 1875 – 20 December 1934) was an Anglican bishop.

Douglas was born into a clerical family. His father was the Reverend W. W. Douglas, a canon of Worcester Cathedral and Rector of Salwarpe, Worcestershire. He was educated at Eton College and King's College, Cambridge. He was ordained as a deacon in 1899 and as a priest in 1900. His first position was as a curate in Gainsborough, Lincolnshire. He was Vice-Principal at Ely Theological College from 1900 to 1908. After a further curacy in Lavender Hill he became Rector of Christ Church, St Leonards-on-Sea in 1912. Eight years later he became principal of the Diocesan Theological College in the Diocese of Zanzibar. From 1925 to 1930 he was the Archdeacon of Korogwe, when he became the Bishop of Nyasaland until his death in 1934.

Anglican Communion titles
Preceded by Thomas Cathrew Fisher	Bishop of Nyasaland; 1930 –1934	Succeeded by Frank Oswald Thorne
