= James Tengatenga =

Malawian Anglican bishop and theologian

The Right Reverend James Tengatenga
- Bishop of Southern Malawi
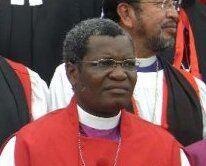
- Tengatenga at the 2008 Lambeth Conference
- Church: Church of the Province of Central Africa
- Diocese: Southern Malawi
- In office: 1998–2013
- Predecessor: Nathaniel Aipa
- Successor: Alinafe Kalemba
- Other posts: Chair of the Anglican Consultative Council (2009–2016); Distinguished visiting professor of global Anglicanism, Sewanee (Since 2014)

Orders
- Ordination: 1985
- Consecration: 1998

Personal details
- Born: 7 April 1958 (age 68) Que Que, Southern Rhodesia
- Denomination: Anglicanism
- Spouse: Joselyn "Josie" Tengatenga
- Children: 3
- Education: Zomba Theological College (diploma); Seminary of the Southwest (MDiv); University of Malawi (PhD)

James Tengatenga (born 7 April 1958) is a Malawian Anglican bishop and theologian. As an Anglican leader in the Global South—and as a member and later chairman of the Anglican Consultative Council—he was known for attempting to hold provinces of the Anglican Communion together amid the Anglican realignment and controversies over LGBT clergy in Anglicanism. He was the bishop of Southern Malawi in the Church of the Province of Central Africa from 1998 to 2013, when he was appointed to a deanship at Dartmouth College, New Hampshire, United States. This appointment was controversially rescinded by Dartmouth president Philip J. Hanlon over comments Tengatenga had made years before criticizing the consecration of Bishop Gene Robinson, an openly gay man. Tengatenga was later appointed to a post at the School of Theology at Sewanee: The University of the South.

== Early life and education ==
Tengatenga was born in Que Que, Southern Rhodesia (modern-day Zimbabwe), on 7 April 1958, to parents of Ngoni origin in Malawi. He was educated at Zomba Theological College, after which he received an M.Div. from the Seminary of the Southwest in the United States. He did further graduate work at the Selly Oak Colleges in Birmingham.

== Ordained ministry ==
Ordained to the priesthood in 1985, Tengatenga was a parish priest in Lilongwe for eight years. From 1993 to 1998, he taught theology at Zomba Theological College and the University of Malawi's Chancellor College.

Tengatenga was elected bishop of Southern Malawi in 1998, succeeding Nathaniel Aipa. He was initially based in Likwenu, a town in the Machinga District, until the Diocese of Upper Shire was carved out of the Southern Malawi diocese in 2002. Tengatenga remained bishop of Southern Malawi and moved the diocese's see city to Blantyre. In 2003, Tengatenga was a visiting fellow at Clare College, Cambridge, where he completed his Ph.D dissertation at the University of Malawi. As bishop, he was a member of the Malawi National AIDS Commission. He also co-authored with surgeon Anne Bayley a guidebook for conversations within families about HIV/AIDS that was intended to break a taboo about discussions of sex within marriages.

== Global Anglicanism ==
In 2002, Tengatenga was named to the Anglican Consultative Council, one of the Anglican Communion's four "instruments of communion". During his time on the ACC—including as chair from 2009 to 2016—Tengatenga dealt with controversies over the consecration of LGBT bishops and recognition of same-sex blessings in the United States and Canada. He was quoted in the Los Angeles Times criticizing the Episcopal Church's 2003 consecration of Gene Robinson, the first openly gay Anglican bishop, saying, "I come from a very frustrated church, a church that feels it has been betrayed by its brothers and sisters." In 2011, he told the Church of England Newspaper that "the Anglican Church hasn't changed, yes we are against homosexuality. . . . The church's position and an individual's are two different things." According to Dartmouth professor and Episcopal priest Randall Balmer, despite his criticisms of the Episcopal Church, Tengatenga sought to hold disparate factions of the Anglican Communion together through his ACC role amid the growing Anglican realignment movement that saw North American Anglican churches divide over issues of theology and sexuality, with some of those separating forging ties with Anglican Communion provinces in the Global South.

=== Dartmouth controversy ===
In July 2013, Tengatenga was announced as the next dean of the William Jewett Tucker Foundation, the spiritual life unit at Dartmouth College. Students and faculty led by the campus chapter of the NAACP criticized the appointment based on Tengatenga's prior public statements on homosexuality. Dartmouth professor Michael Bronski, who circulated a letter opposing Tengatenga's appointment, said Tengatenga should have done more to support LGBT rights in Malawi. Defenders of Tengatenga pointed out that he was widely considered an ally to LGBT activists in Malawi. Randall Balmer argued that Tengatenga's remarks on his frustration with the Episcopal Church had been triggered by Bishop John Shelby Spong's controversial comments criticizing African Christianity as "superstitious." British priest Nicholas Henderson also defended Tengatenga. Tengatenga had previously supported Henderson's election as bishop of Lake Malawi, which had been held up for years over his support for same-sex marriage. Henderson said that the objections on the Dartmouth campus amounted to "asking the impossible for someone coming out of that African situation."

Tengatenga issued a statement that his views had evolved and that he had become a supporter of marriage equality. However, several students and faculty at Dartmouth criticized Tengatenga for not retracting or apologizing for his previous views in the statement. One student said Tengatenga "did not recognize the issues that his constituents face or apologize for harm that his past statement and actions have caused." Adrienne Clay, a department program coordinator in African and African-American studies, called Tengatenga's statement "a little too ambiguous for my taste."

Dartmouth president Phil Hanlon revoked the offer to Tengatenga. Balmer, Henderson, Archbishop Desmond Tutu, Bishop Ian Douglas, and human rights activists Kapya Kaoma, MacDonald Sembereka, Timothy Mtambo and Victor Mukasa, among others, condemned this decision:

The fact that James Tengatenga did not leave behind a record of press releases or public pronouncements — Western forms of activism — does not mean that he was only recently converted to the cause nor that he has not been a loyal and helpful ally to gay activists. Rather, it means that he has been using the methods of the place in which he was trying to make a difference. Unless Africa does not matter to Dartmouth, African human rights defenders should have been recognized as the best judges of Tengatenga's views, past actions, and likely future contributions.

In the fall of 2013, Tengatenga was a presidential fellow at Episcopal Divinity School. In 2014, Tengatenga was appointed distinguished visiting professor of global Anglicanism at the School of Theology at Sewanee.

== Personal life ==
Tengatenga married his wife, Joselyn, in 1984. They have three children.

== Bibliography ==
=== Books ===
- Tengatenga, James (2006). Church, State, and Society in Malawi: An Analysis of Anglican Ecclesiology. Zomba, Malawi: Kachere Books. ISBN 9789990876512.
- Tengatenga, James; Bayley, Anne (2006). Time to talk: A guide to family life in the age of AIDS. Oxford: Strategies for Hope Trust. ISBN 978-1-905746-31-6.
- Tengatenga, James (2010). The UMCA in Malawi: A History of the Anglican Church. Zomba, Malawi: Kachere Books. ISBN 9789990887655.
- Burns, Stephen; Cones, Bryan; Tengatenga, James, eds. (2020). Twentieth Century Anglican Theologians: From Evelyn Underhill to Esther Mombo. Hoboken, New Jersey: Wiley. ISBN 9781119611189.
- Burns, Stephen; Tengatenga, James, eds. (2024). Anglican Theology: Postcolonial Perspectives. London: SCM Press. ISBN 9780334066231.

=== Articles and chapters ===
- Tengatenga, James (2010). "Proclaiming the Good News". In Markham, Ian S.; Hawkins, James Barney; Chapman, Mark; Percy, Martyn (eds.). Christ and Culture: Communion After Lambeth. London: Church Publishing Inc. pp. 55–68. ISBN 9780819227980.
- Tengatenga, James (2013). "Dr. Livingstone, I Presume? The Legacy of Dr. David Livingstone". The Society of Malawi Journal. 66 (1): 1–22. JSTOR 23611941.
- Tengatenga, James (2014). "The State of Liberalism". Modern Believing. 55 (4): 371–376. doi:10.3828/mb.2014.43.
- Tengatenga, James (December 2019). "Moral Majority redivivus: assertive religious politics and the threat to religious freedom and citizenship in Malawi". Stellenbosch Theological Journal. 5 (3). doi:10.17570/stj.2019.v5n3.a08 (inactive 19 August 2025).
- Tengatenga, James (2020). "Operation Bwezani: A Theological Response". In Ross, Kenneth S.; Nzunda, Matembo S. (eds.). Church, Law and Political Transition in Malawi 1992-1994. Luviri Press. pp. 113–122. ISBN 9789996066559.
- Tengatenga, James; Tengatenga Duley, Susan M.; Tengatenga, Cecil J. (2021). "Zimitsani Moto: Understanding the Malawi COVID-19 Response". Laws. 10 (2): 20. doi:10.3390/laws10020020.
- Tengatenga, James (2021). "Not Just Loyal Sheep: Informed Ministry of the Laity". In Glissmann, Volker (ed.). Towards a Malawian Theology of Laity. Luviri Press. pp. 42–50. ISBN 9789996066610.
- Tengatenga, James (Winter 2014). "Sacred Groves: A Call to Service". Sewanee Theological Review. 58 (1): 175–188.

Anglican Communion titles
Preceded by Nathaniel Aipa	Bishop of Southern Malawi; 1998–2013	Succeeded by Alinafe Kalemba
Preceded by John Paterson	Chair of the Anglican Consultative Council; 2009–2016	Succeeded by Paul Kwong
