= Malindi, Malawi =

Malindi
- Location in Malawi
- Coordinates: 14°18′50″S 35°17′09″E
- Country: Malawi
- Region: Southern Region
- District: Mangochi District
- Elevation: 2,600 ft (800 m)
- Time zone: +2

Malindi is a town in the Mangochi District, in the Southern Region of Malawi.

== Location ==
Malindi is located about 24 kilometres (15 mi), by road, north of Mangochi, where the district headquarters are located. This is approximately 215 kilometres (134 mi), by road, north of Blantyre, the largest city in Malawi's Southern Region. The geographical coordinates of Malindi, Malawi are 14°18'50.0"S, 35°17'09.0"E (Latitude:-14.313889; Longitude:35.285833). Malindi is located at an average elevation of 800 metres (2,625 ft), above sea level.

== Overview ==
Malindi is an urban centre in a predominantly rural setting, situated on the south-eastern shores of Lake Malawi. The town is served by St Martins' Hospital, Malindi, a 100-bed mission hospital. Also found in this town is the Malindi Mission School.

== People ==
The minister Nancy Tembo is from this area and Tembo's aunt Dr Elizabeth Sibande was an agronomist involved in developing new maize varieties.
