= Frank Thorne (bishop) =

Frank Oswald Thorne CBE MC (21 May 1892 – 18 September 1981) was an Anglican colonial bishop in Africa the mid 20th century.

He was educated at St Paul's and Christ Church, Oxford. After World War I service with the Manchester Regiment he was ordained in 1922. His first post was as a curate at All Souls, Clapton Park. In 1925 he joined UMCA and became the first Warden of St Cyprian's Theological College, Tunduru in the Diocese of Masasi. From 1936 to 1961 he was Bishop of Nyasaland. He became a Doctor of Divinity (DD).

Church of England titles
Preceded by Gerald Douglas	Bishop of Nyasaland; 1936–1961	Succeeded by Donald Arden
