= John Hine (bishop of Grantham) =

British-born Anglican bishop (1857–1934)

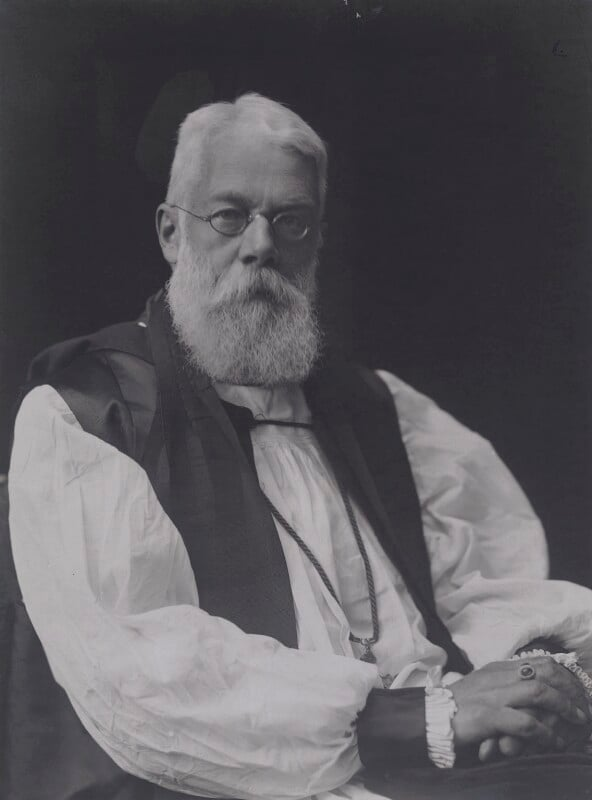
Hine, c. 1920s

John Edward Hine MRCS (10 April 1857 – 9 April 1934) was an Anglican bishop in the late 19th and early 20th centuries.

== Life ==
Hine was born in Nottingham in 1857 and educated at University College School and University College, London. A medical doctor, after ordination he was sent as a missionary to Likoma Island in Lake Malawi and was soon promoted to be Bishop of Likoma. Successively translated to Zanzibar and then Northern Rhodesia, in 1916 he returned to England, firstly as Vicar of Lastingham and after that suffragan bishop of Grantham. In 1930, Hine resigned his see and became an assistant bishop, at William Swayne (Bishop of Lincoln)'s request, to make way for Ernest Blackie. He resigned his archdeaconry on 30 June 1933, remaining assistant bishop until the next year.

As Bishop of Grantham he was the only prelate that psychic researcher Harry Price was able to obtain to witness the opening of Joanna Southcott's box which Price in 1927 claimed to have come into possession of: it was found to contain only a few oddments and unimportant papers, among them a lottery ticket and a horse-pistol. Price's claims to have had the true box have been disputed by historians and by followers of Southcott.

A statue, carved in 1956 and placed on the west front of St Wulfram's Church, Grantham, commemorates Hine. It depicts the bishop with a cat, that is playing with the tassel of Hine's robe.

Anglican Communion titles
Preceded by Chauncy Maples	Bishop of Likoma; 1896– 1901	Succeeded by Gerard Trower
Preceded by William Moore Richardson	Bishop of Zanzibar; 1901 – 1908	Succeeded by Frank Weston
New title	Bishop of Northern Rhodesia; 1910– 1914	Succeeded by Alston James Weller May
Church of England titles
Preceded by Welbore MacCarthy	Bishop of Grantham; 1920 – 1930	Succeeded by Ernest Morell Blackie
