= Alinafe Kalemba =

Malawian Anglican bishop (born 1967)

The Right Reverend Alinafe Kalemba
- Bishop of Southern Malawi
- Church: Church of the Province of Central Africa
- Diocese: Southern Malawi
- In office: 2013–present
- Predecessor: James Tengatenga
- Previous posts: Dean/Principal, Leonard Kamungu Theological College

Orders
- Ordination: July 1994
- Consecration: 27 October 2013 by Albert Chama

Personal details
- Born: May 7, 1967 (age 59) Mwadzama, Nkhotakota District, Malawi
- Denomination: Anglicanism
- Spouse: Mercy
- Children: 2
- Education: Zomba Theological College (diploma); University of Malawi Chancellor College (BA); Durham University (MA)

Alinafe Kalemba (born 7 May 1967) is a Malawian Anglican bishop and academic administrator. Since 2013, he has been bishop of Southern Malawi in the Church of the Province of Central Africa. Prior this, he was principal of Leonard Kamungu Theological College, the first Anglican seminary in Malawi.

== Early life and education ==
Kalemba was born in 1967 in Mwadzama, Nkhotakota District, Malawi. He initially pursued an engineering degree at Malawi Polytechnic, but he withdrew in 1990 to pursue ordaind ministry at Zomba Theological College, where he received a diploma in theology in 1993. He later obtained a BA in theology from Chancellor College and a MA in theological research from Durham University.

== Ordained ministry ==
Kalemba was a parish priest before being appointed canon to the ordinary to Bishop James Tengatenga. He later became the founding dean of Leonard Kimungu Theological College in Zomba. Previously, Anglican candidates for ministry had trained at Zomba Theological College.

In 2013, Kalemba was elected bishop of Southern Malawi to replace Tengatenga. He was consecrated in October 2013. During his episcopacy, he has urged the accleration of missionary work, facilitated the Anglican Communion's work on theological education in Africa, and advocated for economic stability in Malawi. In 2019, he urged then-Malawian president Peter Mutharika, then-opposition leader Lazarus Chakwera and former vice president Saulos Chilima to "swallow their pride and come together in search of peace," arguing that the political impasse at the time could lead to civil war.

== Personal life ==
Kalemba is married to Mercy, with whom he has two children.

Anglican Communion titles
| Preceded by James Tengatenga | Bishop of Southern Malawi; Since 2013 | Incumbent |
