= Cathrew Fisher =

British Anglican bishop (1871–1929)

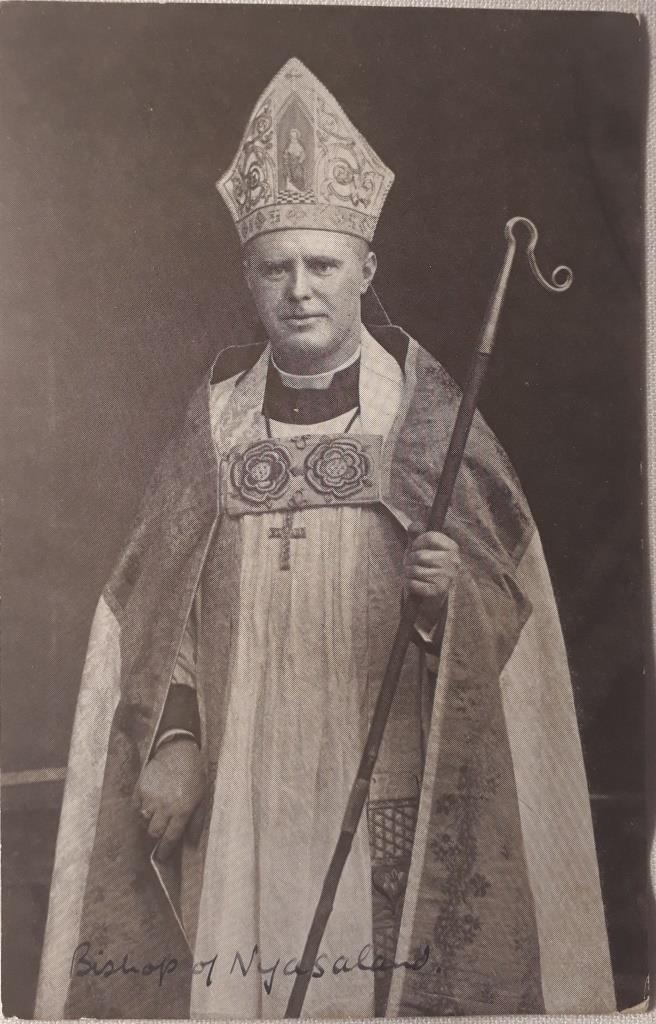
Fisher in 1910

Thomas Cathrew Fisher (7 January 1871 – 8 November 1929) was an Anglican bishop.

Fisher was born in Kempston and was educated at Uppingham School, Trinity College, Cambridge and Ripon College Cuddesdon. He was ordained deacon in 1895 and priest in 1896. His first position was as an assistant curate at St John the Divine, Kennington. Later he was the Assistant Diocesan Inspector of Schools in the Diocese of Rochester and then the General Diocesan Inspector of Schools in the Diocese of Oxford. In 1910 he became the Bishop of Nyasaland, until his death in a motor accident in 1929.

Church of England titles
Preceded by Gerard Trower	Bishop of Nyasaland; 1910 – 1929	Succeeded by Gerald Wybergh Douglas
