= Donald Arden =

British Anglican archbishop in Central Africa (1916–2014)

The Right Reverend Donald Arden CBE
- Archbishop of Central Africa
- Church: Church of the Province of Central Africa
- In office: 1971 (elected)–1981 (resigned)
- Predecessor: Oliver Green-Wilkinson
- Successor: Walter Khotso Makhulu
- Other post: Bishop of Nyasaland (1961–1964 {name of see changed

Personal details
- Born: 12 April 1916 Boscombe, Hampshire, England
- Died: 18 July 2014 (aged 98) Romsey, Hampshire, England
- Denomination: Anglican
- Parents: Stanley & Winifred
- Spouse: Jane Riddle; 1962 (married)–2014 (his death)
- Children: 2 sons
- Occupation: missionary
- Education: University of Leeds (BA); Mirfield (ministerial formation)

Ordination history
History
Episcopal consecration
- Principal consecrator: Oliver Green-Wilkinson
- Co-consecrators: Cecil Alderson, Obadiah Kariuki, Tom Savage
Episcopal succession
Bishops consecrated by Donald Arden as principal consecrator
- Patrick Murindagomo: 25 January 1973
- Peter Nyanja: 5 June 1978
- Peter Hatendi: February 4, 1979
- Walter Khotso Makhulu: June 10, 1979
- Dunstan Ainani: 17 June 1979

Donald Seymour Arden (12 April 1916 – 18 July 2014) was a British-Australian Anglican archbishop, and campaigner for issues of justice and equality.

== Ministry ==
Arden was educated at St Peter's College, Adelaide, and the University of Leeds. He was ordained deacon in 1939 and priest in 1940, after studying at the College of the Resurrection, Mirfield. His first posts were curacies in Hatcham and Nettleden. In 1944, he joined the Pretoria African Mission, eventually becoming Director of the Usuthu Mission in Swaziland.

From 1961 to 1971, he was the Bishop of Nyasaland/Malawi – as Bishop of Nyasaland until Malawian independence in 1964 and as Bishop of Malawi thereafter. When the diocese split in 1971, he became bishop of one of the two new dioceses as Bishop of Southern Malawi. Also in that year, he became Archbishop of Central Africa, and held both posts until retiring in 1980.

Having given up the archbishopric, Arden returned to the UK to become priest in charge of St Margaret's Church, Uxbridge, where he served from 1981 to 1986.

Arden repeatedly campaigned for the rights of indigenous African people. Within the Church he set about training indigenous black African priests, and campaigned for the appointment of indigenous bishops. It was a matter of pride to him that he was the last white Archbishop of Central Africa.

== Retirement ==
In retirement, Arden served as an honorary assistant priest at St Alban's Church in North Harrow, and as an honorary assistant bishop in the Diocese of London. He gave up these roles in 2011 and moved to Romsey, Hampshire, where he lived the final years of his life. In December 2011, Arden celebrated 50 years of episcopal ministry with his family at St Paul's Cathedral, London. He was consecrated (as Bishop of Nyasaland) on 30 November 1961.

He died at home in Romsey, Hampshire, on 18 July 2014, aged 98. His family announced that he would be cremated in an African banana leaf coffin on 31 July 2014.

His wife Jane Arden survived him. She is a dedicated church worker.

Church of England titles
Preceded by Frank Thorne	Bishop of Nyasaland; 1961–1964	Succeeded by Himself as Bishop of Malawi
Preceded by Himself as Bishop of Nyasaland	Bishop of Malawi; 1964–1971	Diocese split
New diocese	Bishop of Southern Malawi; 1971–1980	Succeeded by Dunstan Ainani
Preceded by Oliver Green-Wilkinson	Archbishop of Central Africa; 1969–1980	Succeeded by Walter Khotso Makhulu
