= Mozambique Ports and Railways =

Railway system of Mozambique and its connected ports

Mozambique Ports and Railways Portos e Caminhos de Ferro de Moçambique
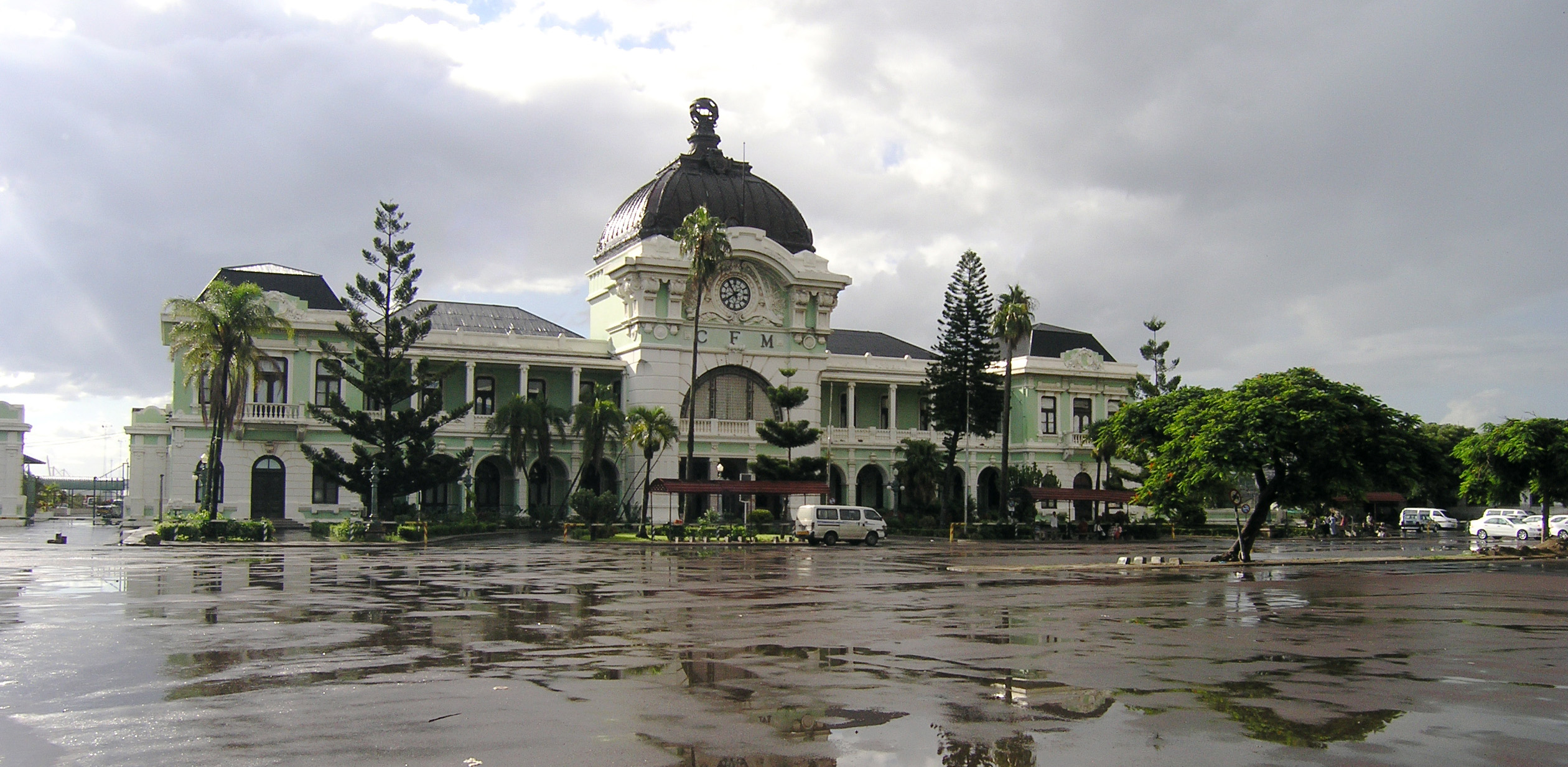
- Maputo Railway Station, which was built between 1913 and 1916
- Company type: Government-owned
- Industry: Rail transport
- Headquarters: Mozambique
- Website: www.cfm.co.mz

Railway network of Mozambique

Portos e Caminhos de Ferro de Moçambique (abbreviated CFM; in English Mozambique Ports and Railways) is a state-owned company that oversees the railway system of Mozambique and its connected ports.

The rail system is composed of a total of 2,983 km rail of the 1,067 mm (3 ft 6 in) gauge that is compatible with neighboring rail systems. In addition there is a 140 km line of 762 mm (2 ft 6 in) gauge, the Gaza Railway.

The system developed over more than a century from three different ports at the Indian Ocean that serve as terminals for separate lines to the hinterland. The railroads were major targets during the Mozambican Civil War, were sabotaged by RENAMO, and are being rehabilitated. Management has been largely outsourced. At this time there is no directly interconnecting rail service between the three lines. Each line has its own development corridor.

In August 2010, Mozambique and Botswana signed a memorandum of understanding to develop a 1,100 km railway through Zimbabwe, to carry coal from Serule in Botswana to a deepwater port at Techobanine Point in Mozambique.

== Nacala railway / CFM Norte ==
The seaport of Nacala is the terminal of the Nacala railway, the most recent addition to the railway system. Construction of the railway began in 1915 at the port of Lumbo, but money ran out and construction stalled at Monapo. When construction resumed, and it was decided that Nacala should be the seaport terminus and a branch was built between Monapo and Nacala. By 1932 the railway reached 350 km from Nacala to Mutivasse, and by 1950 it extended to Nova Freixo (present-day Cuamba), 538 km from Nacala. An additional 46 km were constructed northwestwards to Vila Cabral (present-day Lichinga). In 1970, the government of Malawi completed a link between Nova Freixo and Nkaya Junction in Malawi, where it connected to Malawi Railways' main north-south railway line, also called the Sena Railway. The Nacala line was a longer but more direct route from Malawi to the sea than the older Sena line to Beira, and most Malawian freight traffic shifted to the Nacala line. The line was closed in 1984, when RENAMO rebels blew up a portion of the line during the Mozambican Civil War.

The Mozambican government began rehabilitation of the line in November 2005. The railway system is operated by Northern Development Corridor. Vale bought a stake in the operator in 2010 and planned a new link from Moatize, where Vale has coal mines, east to Nkaya Junction, connecting there to the existing line to Nacala. It was constructed as the Nacala Logistics Corridor, and was completed in 2017. The project included a coal export terminal and coal storage yard at the port of Nacala-a-Velha.

== Machipanda line / CFM Centro ==
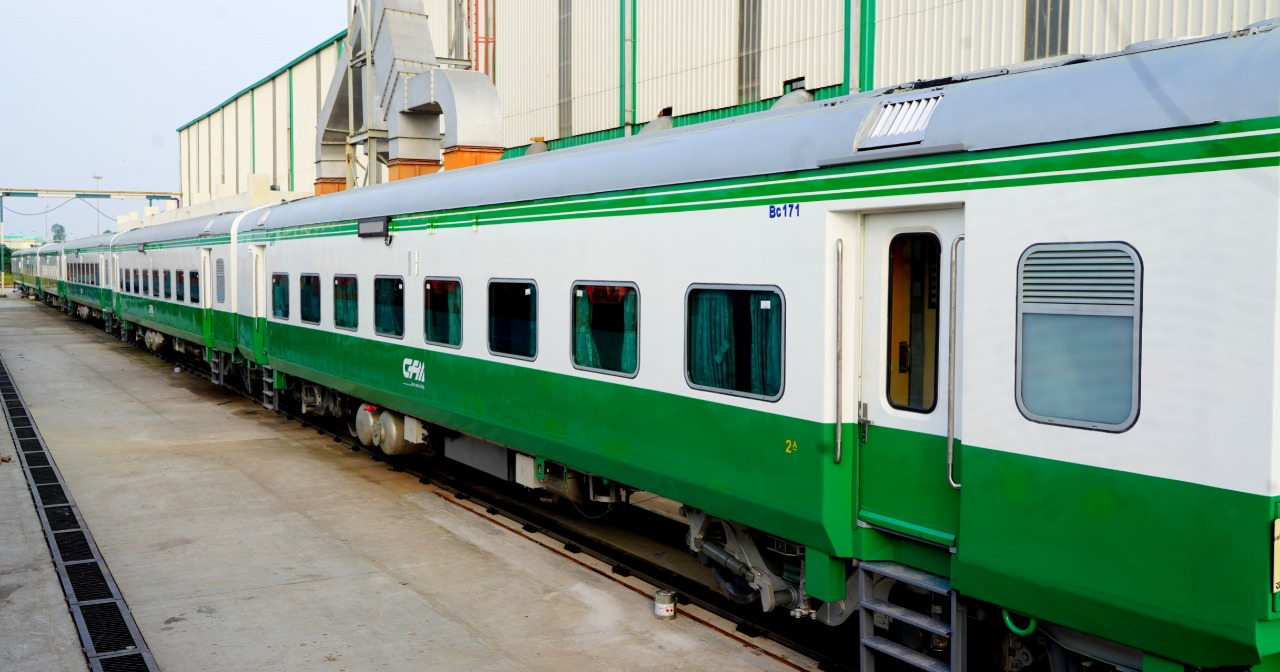
New LHB Coaches added in Mozambique railways

Beira is the terminal of the Machipanda line, the oldest railway in Mozambique, opened in 1899 as part of the Beira–Bulawayo railway to then Southern Rhodesia, now Zimbabwe, and its transits. The Machipanda line was leased to the Beira Railroad Corporation from 2005 to 2011.

== Sena Line / CFM Centro ==
The Sena line connects to Malawi as well as to Zambia. The Malawian stretch, between the cities of Marka and Mchinji, is run by Central East African Railways (CEAR). In the short stretch in the territory of Zambia, between the cities of Mwami and Chipata, the railway is run by Zambia Railways (ZR). Within Mozambique, the Sena Line has a branch to the coal fields of Moatize, that also connects to the Nacala line.

== Maputo railroad / CFM Sul ==
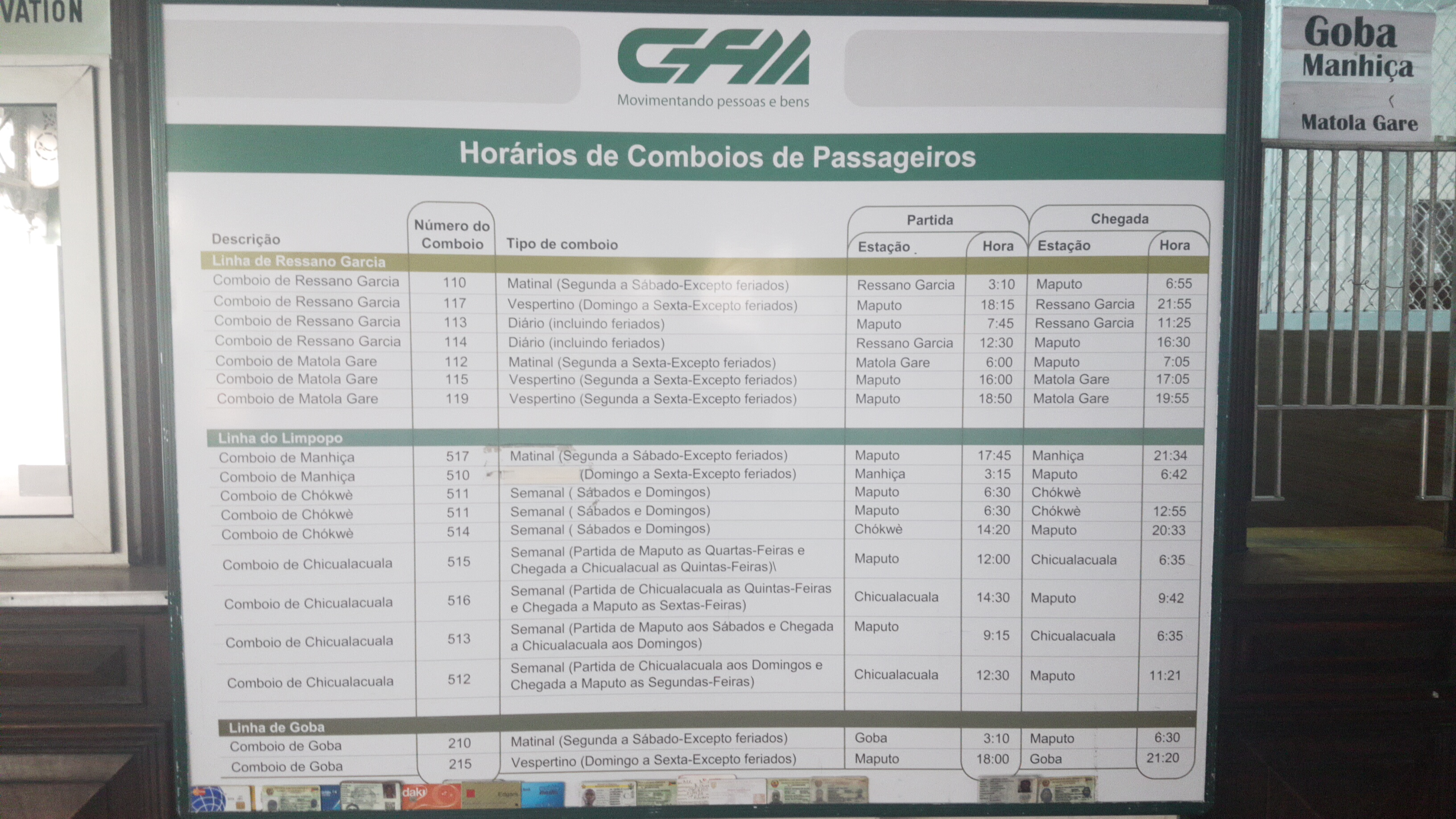
Train timetable of Maputo

Maputo, formerly Lourenço Marques, and Matola are the terminals of the Maputo line that links to north-eastern part of South Africa. Like the Ressano Garcia Railway Company, the Pretoria-Maputo line is managed by the NLBP (New Limpopo Bridge Project Investments) together with Transnet Freight Rail and CPM with the aim to rehabilitate and operate the line to the border of South Africa. In South Africa the link goes to Komatipoort and further to Johannesburg. The Maputo line also links to Eswatini Railways and the National Railways of Zimbabwe.

== Rail links to adjacent countries ==
- Malawi on Nacala railway in operation; link to Sena Line
- South Africa yes - same gauge - 1,067 mm (3 ft 6 in) - Pretoria–Maputo railway
- Eswatini yes - same gauge - 1,067 mm (3 ft 6 in) - Goba railway
- Tanzania no direct link - break of gauge - 1,067 mm (3 ft 6 in)/1,000 mm (3 ft 3 3/8 in) metre gauge
- Zambia no direct link, Nacala railway passes first through Malawi.
- Zimbabwe yes - same gauge - 1,067 mm (3 ft 6 in), from Beira (Beira–Bulawayo railway) and from Maputo (Limpopo railway)

== See also ==
- Filipe Nyusi, former president of Mozambique, was executive director of CMF-Norte, the northern division of the company, in 1995
- Economy of Mozambique
- History of rail transport in Mozambique
- Transport in Mozambique
- Railway stations in Mozambique
