= Liwonde =

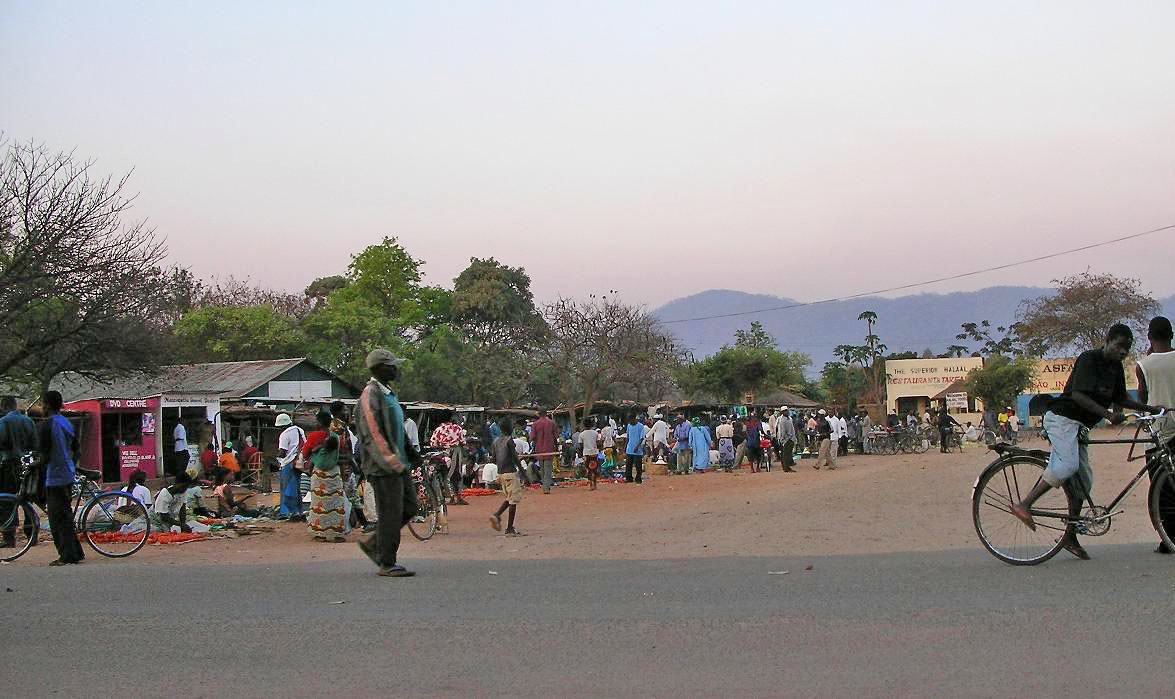
- market area

- Location in Malawi
- Coordinates: 15°04′S 35°14′E
- Country: Malawi
- Region: Southern Region
- District: Machinga District

Population (2018 Census)
  - Total: 36,421
- Time zone: +2
- Climate: Aw

Liwonde, or Livonde, is a town located in Machinga District, in the Southern Region of Malawi.

== Geography ==
Located in Machinga District in the Southern Region of Malawi, Liwonde is located in the Shire River valley. Its main landmark is the road that connects Zomba to Lilongwe, making the town a crossroads between Balaka, Machinga, Mangochi and Zomba.

Another Liwonde landmark is the Liwonde National Park nature conservation area. The town thus serves as a dormitory, support center and access base for tourists and researchers traveling to Liwonde National Park. Trips to the interior of the park depart from Liwonde by sailing along the Shire River (year-round) or by car on the access roads.

=== Demographics ===
The main ethnic groups in the town are the Chewas and the Yaos, with minorities of the Ngoni and Lomwe peoples. There is a group of expatriates left over from the Mozambican civil war, as well as Asian immigrants.

Year	Population
1987	8,694
1998	15,701
2008	22,927
2018	36,421

=== Climate ===
In the region of the town of Liwonde, the tropical savanna climate (Aw) prevails, with a hot thermal sensation throughout the day.

=== Vegetation ===
The savannah that surrounds the town is characterized by the small amount of trees, especially the many bushes. Among the large trees, the baobab stands out.

== Economy ==
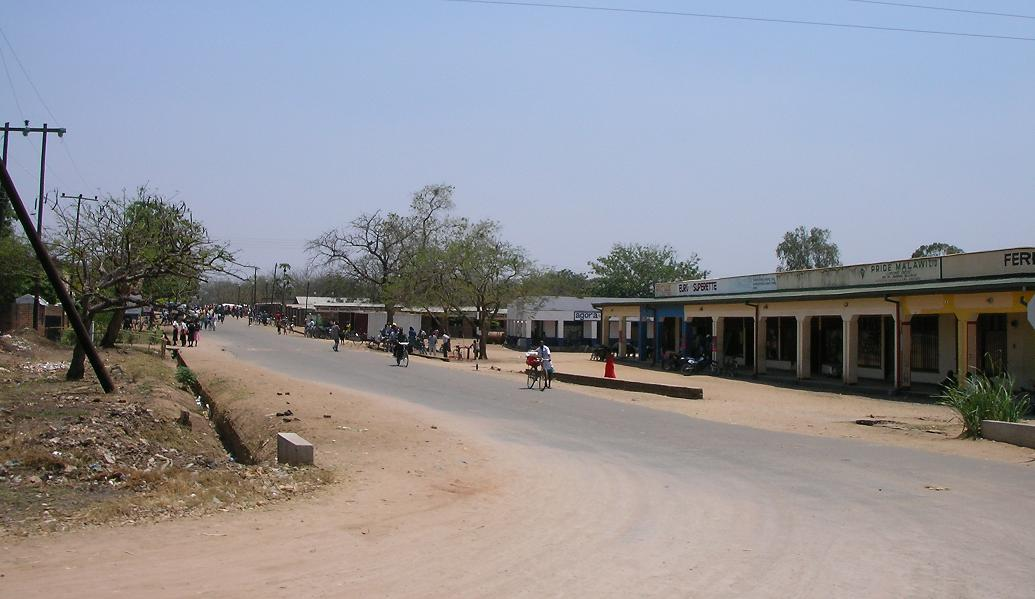
Looking west across a livond road which continues to the National Park

Liwonde's economy is basically agricultural, centered on the production of corn flour, tomatoes, onions, cabbage, bananas, pumpkins, cassava, sweet potatoes, Irish potatoes, sugar cane, rice and beans. Goats are bred for meat, and poultry are bred for their eggs.

Shopping centers in the area include PTC, McConnell's and Euro Superette.

== Infrastructure ==
In 2002, the town had a residential supply of water and electricity, but it was not available to the majority of the population. There was also landline and mobile telephony, with signal failures. Liwonde also had a hospital.

The town has a railway station on the Nacala railway, under concession of Central East African Railways. The town of Liwonde has one of the most important railway stations on the Nacala railway, linking Mwanza and Nkaya (west) to Nayuchi and Port of Nacala (east).
