= Central East African Railways =

Central East African Railways is a consortium formed in 1999, led by the Railroad Development Corporation, which won the right to operate the Malawi Railways network. The company was sold in September 2008 to INSITEC, an investment group based in Mozambique.

== Operations ==
It mainly manages the Sena railway line, which currently links the railway stations of Blantyre/Limbe, Nkaya, Chipoka, Salima, Lilongwe and Mchinji. Its concession also includes the sections between Marka, Nsanje, Bangula, Luchenza and Blantyre/Limbe stations, which are currently inoperative.

In 2010, a multinational mining company Vale (with CEAR and Mozambique Ports and Railways) managed to sew the formation of the joint venture "Integrated Northern Logistical Corridor Society", for the administration of the Nacala railway, having permission to build the railway extension to the coal belt of Benga-Moatize, where the mining company has mineral exploration concessions. The extension departed from the Nkaya interconnection station and continued to Moatize, being completed in 2017. The project includes an export terminal and a coal storage yard at the port of Nacala-a-Velha. This subsidiary therefore manages the Malawian sections of the Nacala railway line between Nayuchi, Liwonde, Nkaya (junction railway station) and Mwanza stations.

== See also ==
- Rail transport in Malawi
- Transport in Malawi
