= Nacala-a-Velha =

- Location within Mozambique
- Coordinates: 14°27′S 40°40′E
- Country: Mozambique
- Provinces: Nampula Province
- District: Nacala-a-Velha District

Government
  - Type: Democratico
- Climate: Aw

Nacala-a-Velha is a town and district on the northern coast of Mozambique. It is located on the western shore of inner Fernao Veloso Bay, opposite the city of Nacala. On some maps and in some business addresses, the name 'Minguri' is substituted for it or associated with it.

Nacala-a-Velha is the site of a large marine coal terminal which opened in January 2016. The terminal is part of the Port of Nacala, but physically separate from the container port of that name across the bay. Both facilities are connected to the Nacala railway (via a junction about 15 km south of the bay) to the coalfields at Moatize in Tete Province, and to Malawi and Zambia, as well as Zimbabwe via Malawi. Coal from Moatize is loaded from trains onto ships at Nacala-a-Velha for export to other countries.

The Nacala Railway and the Port of Nacala form the basis of the Nacala Logistics Corridor managed by the Sociedade do Corredor Logístico Integrado do Norte and its division Nacala Logistics.

== See also ==
- Fernao Veloso Bay
- Transport in Mozambique
- Railway stations in Mozambique
