= Valente =

Valente is an Italian and Portuguese surname, and may refer to:

== People ==
- Ailen Valente (born 1996), Argentine female artistic gymnast
- Alfredo Valente (photographer) (1899–1973), Italian born American photographer
- Benita Valente (1934–2025), American soprano
- Bruno Valente (born 1982), Portuguese footballer
- Carlos Silva Valente (1948–2024), Portuguese football referee
- Caterina Valente (1931–2024), Italian singer, guitarist, dancer, and actress
- Catherynne M. Valente (born 1979), American poet, novelist, and literary critic
- Claudio Manuel Neves Valente (c. 1977–2025), Portuguese accused of homicides as 2025 Brown University shooting#Suspect
- Diogo Valente (born 1984), Portuguese footballer
- Duarte Valente (born 1999), Portuguese professional footballer
- Gary Valente (born 1953), American jazz trombonist
- Hugo Valente (born 1992), French racing driver
- Ivan Valente (born 1946), Brazilian politician, teacher and engineer
- Jennifer Valente (born 1994), American racing cyclist
- John Valente (born 1995), American baseball player
- José Ángel Valente (1929–2000), Spanish poet
- José Valente (born 1969), Brazilian middle-distance runner
- Laura Valente, stage name of Laura Bortolotti (born 1963), Italian singer and musician
- Marcos Valente (born 1994), Portuguese professional footballer
- Michael Valente (1895–1976), Italian-American soldier
- Miguel Valente (born 1993), Brazilian swimmer
- Milton Valente (born 1998), Angolan basketball player
- Nicola Valente (born 1991), Italian footballer
- Nuno Valente (born 1974), Portuguese footballer
- Renato Valente, Italian film actor
- Renée Valente (1927–2016), American film and television producer
- Ricardo Valente (1991), Portuguese professional footballer
- Rodolfo Valente (born 1993), Brazilian actor
- Rodrigo Valente (born 2001), Portuguese professional footballer
- Saverio Valente (born 1962), Argentine former footballer
- Sergio Paulo Barbosa Valente (born 1980), Portuguese footballer known as Duda
- Tony Valente (born 1984), French comic artist
- Valeria Valente (born 1976), Italian politician and lawyer

== Fictional ==
- Thomas Valente, Jericho character

== Places ==
- Valente, Bahia, Brazil
- Valente, Mozambique

== Other uses ==
- Mercedes-Benz Valente, a model released in Australia
- Sergio Valente (brand), Clothing brand
- Valente Quintero (film), a 1973 Mexican film directed by Mario Hernández
- Valente v R, a Supreme Court of Canada decision on protection of judicial independence

== See also ==
- Valenti (surname)
