= History of rail transport in Mozambique =

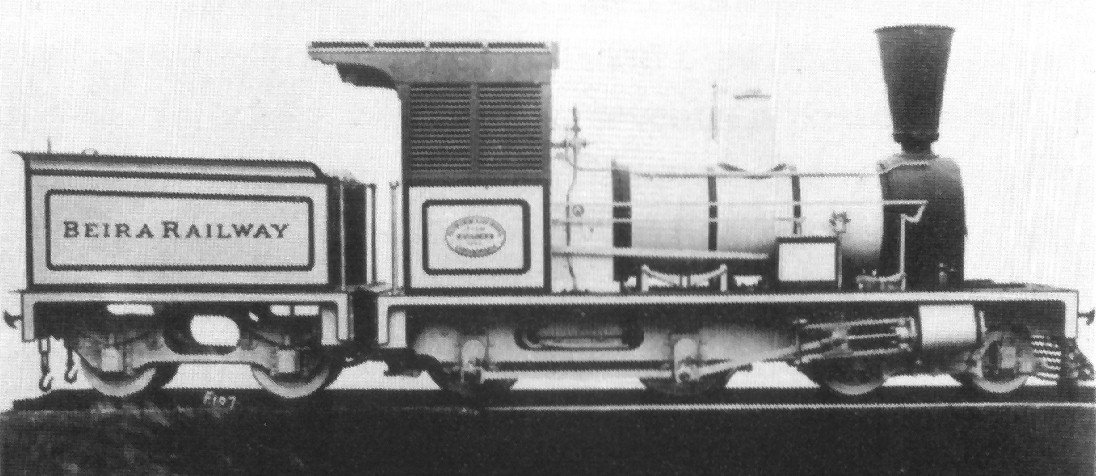
Beira Railway class F2, 1895

The history of rail transport in Mozambique began in the latter years of the nineteenth century.

== Portuguese colonial period ==
=== Beginnings ===
The Mozambique of the nineteenth century was a Portuguese colony. In the 1870s, there were initial plans to link the then Lourenço Marques – now Maputo – by railway line with the area around Johannesburg in South Africa. The planned line would have provided the independent Boer republics in the north of South Africa with access to a port. However, the province of Transvaal, to which Johannesburg belonged, was then a British possession.

=== Pretoria–Maputo Railway ===
On 1 March 1890, Mozambique's first railway line was opened between Lourenço Marques and Ressano Garcia. Only in 1895 did operations commence on the rest of the line, across the border to Pretoria, as the Delagoa Bay Railway. This line was constructed by the Netherlands–South African Railway Company (NZASM) and was officially inaugurated on 1 January 1895. The line crossed into South Africa at Ressano Garcia and Komatipoort. In connection with the opening of this line, the Gaza Empire in southwestern Mozambique was immediately subjugated by the Portuguese, because it endangered the safety of the rail traffic.

=== Beira–Bulawayo Railway ===
In 1891, Portugal and the United Kingdom signed a contract for the construction of the Beira Railway, to link the Mozambican port of Beira with Salisbury. By 1900, this line was in service, in 1,067 mm (3 ft 6 in) gauge (Cape gauge) throughout.

=== Gaza Railway ===
The Gaza Railway was a 2 ft 6 in (762 mm) railway operating in southern Mozambique from Xai-Xai (former Villa de Joäo Belo) via Manjacaze junction with branches to Chicomo and Mauela. It was constructed in the early 1900s.

=== Goba Railway ===
At the beginning of the twentieth century, the railway network of Mozambique was expanded. From 1903, a 54 km (34 mi) long line was built from Lourenço Marques to Goba, on the border with Swaziland, so that Swaziland, a British colony at that time, could export its natural resources. In 1909, this line was opened.

=== Sena Railway ===
In 1912, a contract was signed for the construction of a line from Beira to the Nyasaland Protectorate, now Malawi.

=== Nacala Railway ===
In the north of Mozambique, a line was built from the port of Nacala via Nampula and Cuamba to Nyasaland, where it connected with the Nyasaland rail network. A branch line ran from Cuamba north to Lichinga, near Lake Malawi.

=== Limpopo Railway ===
It connects Maputo, in Mozambique, to the city of Somabhula, in Zimbabwe, allowing interconnection with the Beira-Bulawayo railway.

=== Zambézia line ===
In the province of Zambézia, a 120 km (75 mi) long line was built from Quelimane on the Indian Ocean north to Mocuba. It has no connection with any other railway lines.

=== Management of the colonial railways ===
All of Mozambique's colonial railways were operated initially by chartered companies, for which the lines were one of their main sources of income, alongside the collection of taxes and profits from agriculture. Only in 1941 was the last concession company nationalized, thus bringing the railways under the total ownership of the Portuguese colonial authorities.

== Independence period ==
In connection with the independence of Mozambique, the national railway company, Caminhos de Ferro de Moçambique, was founded on 25 June 1975. It was later renamed Portos e Caminhos de Ferro de Moçambique ("Mozambique Ports and Railways") and also took over the operation of sea ports.

As a result of the Mozambican civil war from 1977 to 1992, the railway was severely restricted. Some lines were destroyed by war, such as the Beira–Sena–Moatize and the link from Sena to Malawi (Sena line), after the bridge over the Zambezi at Sena was blown up.

The Nacala–Cuamba line in the north of the country was rebuilt in the 1990s, but the section to the Malawian border remained impassable. In 2004, Mozambique was given a loan from the World Bank to rebuild several lines. Also in 2004, the CCFB, 51% owned by two Indian companies and 49% owned by the CFM, acquired the concession for the operation of the Beira Railway and the rebuilt Sena line.

In 2008, the route length of the network as a whole was 3,100 km (1,926 mi). Since then, several other lines have been reopened.

== See also ==
- History of rail transport
- History of Mozambique
- Rail transport in Mozambique
