= List of deepest natural harbours =

List of the world's deepest natural harbours by average and maximum depth

This article presents a non-exhaustive list of the world’s deepest natural harbours. Often formed by flooded estuaries, rias, fjords, or coastal basins, natural harbours are valued for their protection from ocean swell, deep navigable waters, and strategic positioning. Deep natural harbours have historically played a critical role in military and commercial development, contributing to the rise of major port cities. Their natural shelter often reduces the need for artificial structures such as breakwaters and dredged channels.

== List parameters ==
This list ranks harbours solely by their natural average and maximum depths. Artificially deepened deep water ports are excluded unless their depth is primarily natural. Other characteristics such as surface area, catchment, or shipping volume are not considered.

=== Depth rationale ===
For the purposes of this list, a deep natural harbour is defined as having a minimum natural depth of approximately 15 m (49 ft), sufficient to accommodate most large commercial and naval vessels without major dredging. This threshold reflects the typical draft requirements of Panamax and Post-Panamax container ships, which range from 12 to 15 m (39 to 49 ft) depending on capacity and loading.

=== Harbour definition ===
A harbour is defined as a sheltered coastal body of water with sufficient depth to support safe anchorage and developed port operations, regularly used for mooring, cargo handling, or naval activities. A natural harbour is identified not only by its geographic formation, but also by its functional use without requiring extensive dredging.

Natural harbours may occur within fjords, lagoons, or straits, but not all deep coastal features qualify. For example, some fjords or straits may have significant depth but lack developed port facilities or regular anchorage, and are therefore excluded. Conversely, many qualifying harbours are located within fjord-like environments.

Note: The table below is sortable. By default, entries are listed alphabetically. To sort by depth, location, or other fields, click the arrow icon at the top of the relevant column.

Name and image	Settlements, country and region	Depth (m/ft)		Coordinates	Notes
Name and image	Settlements, country and region	Average	Maximum	Coordinates	Notes
Bay of Kotor	Kotor Montenegro	27.3 (90)	60 (200)	42°25′27″N 18°40′1.72″E	The Bay of Kotor is a winding, fjord-like bay located on the Adriatic coast of Montenegro. Often referred to as Europe's southernmost fjord, this deep-water inlet extends approximately 28 km (17 mi) inland, surrounded by steep limestone mountains. The bay is renowned for its scenic beauty, well-preserved medieval towns, and historic fortifications, particularly the UNESCO-listed town of Kotor. Its deepest point is located near the narrow Verige Strait, which measures just 340 m (1,120 ft) in width.
Bedford Basin	Halifax Nova Scotia, Canada	18 (59)	71 (233)	44°41′32.13″N 63°38′20.68″W	The Bedford Basin is the innermost and deepest section of Halifax Harbour in Halifax, Nova Scotia, Canada. It receives inflow from several rivers, most notably the Sackville River, and reaches its deepest point near the Compass Buoy station. The basin’s sheltered and naturally deep waters have greatly contributed to Halifax's development into a central naval and commercial anchorage. During the Second World War, it served as the principal assembly point for transatlantic convoys departing from Halifax. Its proximity to the Bedford Institute of Oceanography also supports ongoing oceanographic research and environmental marine monitoring.
Burrard Inlet	Vancouver British Columbia, Canada	18.4 (60)	45 (148)	49°18′N 123°6′W	Burrard Inlet is a naturally deep fjord on the southwest coast of British Columbia, forming the sheltered waterway that hosts Vancouver Harbour and the Port of Vancouver. The inlet is carved into the Coast Mountains and opens westward into the Strait of Georgia, providing a deep, ice-free port with protection from open ocean swell. While parts of the Port of Vancouver, particularly along the Fraser River, rely on extensive dredging to maintain a navigable depth of 11.5 metres, Burrard Inlet reaches natural depths of up to 45 m (148 ft) in the outer section, near First Narrows, while inner arms such as Port Moody Arm are significantly shallower, averaging around 10 m (33 ft).
Cam Ranh Bay	Cam Ranh Khánh Hòa Province, Vietnam	18 to 20 (59 to 66)	50 (160)	11°59′N 109°13′E	Cam Ranh Bay is a deep and sheltered natural harbour located on the southeastern coast of Vietnam, in Khánh Hòa Province. Spanning approximately 32 km (20 mi) in length and 16 km (9.9 mi) in width, the bay has an average depth of 18 to 20 m (59 to 66 ft), with maximum depths reaching up to 50 m (160 ft) in the outer bay. Due to its depth and strategic location, Cam Ranh Bay has been used as a naval base by several powers throughout history, including France, the United States, the Soviet Union, and modern-day Vietnam. It remains one of the most naturally secure anchorages in the Asia-Pacific region.
Carrick Roads	Falmouth; Truro; Penryn Cornwall, England	13 (43)	34 (112)	50°10′19.38″N 5°2′1.67″W	Carrick Roads is a deep-water estuary formed by the flooded valley of the River Fal in Cornwall, England. Extending from Falmouth Bay in the south to the city of Truro in the north, it provides a sheltered, navigable waterway crucial for maritime trade, recreation, and wildlife habitats.
Charleston Harbor	Charleston South Carolina, United States	15.85 (52.0)	15.85 (52.0)	32°46′N 79°55′W	Charleston Harbor is a natural estuary formed by the confluence of the Ashley and Cooper Rivers, opening into the Atlantic Ocean. Historically significant, it was the site of the first shots of the American Civil War at Fort Sumter. While the harbour has undergone dredging to reach a depth of 15.85 m (52.0 ft), it retains its natural configuration and remains one of the deepest navigable harbours on the U.S. East Coast.
Elliott Bay	Seattle Washington, United States	23.2 (76)	180 (600)	47°36′N 122°20′W	Elliott Bay is a naturally deep inlet of Puget Sound, located in central Seattle, Washington, United States. It serves as the primary waterway for the Port of Seattle, a major West Coast seaport. The bay contains multiple submarine canyons, with the deepest reaching approximately 180 m (600 ft), creating a broad, sheltered anchorage for commercial vessels. With operational depths of around 23.2 m (76 ft), Elliott Bay allows year-round access for large cargo ships. The port handles containers, breakbulk, Ro-Ro, and cruise traffic, and serves as a major gateway for U.S. trade with Asia and Alaska.
Golden Horn	Istanbul Bosporus Strait, Turkey	13.85 (45.4)	30 (98)	41°1′38.51″N 28°57′44.2″E	The Golden Horn is an estuary in Istanbul, Turkey, forming a natural harbour that has historically served as an important maritime and commercial hub. The estuary has an average depth of approximately 13.85 m (45.4 ft), with around 17% of its area exceeding 30 m (98 ft), while 55% is shallower than 10 m (33 ft). At its confluence with the Bosphorus, the depth reaches a maximum of 35 m (115 ft).
Guanabara Bay	Rio de Janeiro; Niterói; Duque de Caxias; São Gonçalo Rio de Janeiro, Brazil	8 (26)	28 (92)	22°54′S 43°10′W	The harbour of Rio de Janeiro, known as Guanabara Bay, is a large natural bay located on the southeastern coast of Brazil. It covers an area of approximately 412 km^{2} (159 sq mi) and is surrounded by prominent cities including Rio de Janeiro, Niterói, Duque de Caxias, and São Gonçalo. The bay has an average depth of about 8 m (26 ft), with maximum depths reaching up to 28 m (92 ft) in certain areas. The bay is renowned for its natural beauty, framed by iconic landmarks such as Sugarloaf Mountain and the Christ the Redeemer statue atop Corcovado Mountain. Despite facing environmental challenges, Guanabara Bay remains a central economic and cultural hub, housing the Port of Rio de Janeiro, one of Brazil's busiest ports, and a popular destination for tourism and maritime activities.
Kaipara Harbour	Dargaville; Helensville; Tinopai; Port Albert North Island, New Zealand	55 (180)	60 (200)	36°23′55.45″S 174°12′29.32″E	Covering approximately 947 km^{2} (366 sq mi), Kaipara Harbour on New Zealand's North Island reaches depths exceeding 55 m (180 ft) in places, although most areas are significantly shallower, featuring extensive intertidal mudflats and channels. While precise average depth data is unavailable, the harbour's entrance narrows to about 6 km (3.7 mi) before widening to approximately 60 km (37 mi) across its interior.
Milford Haven Waterway	Milford Haven; Pembroke Dock; Neyland; Pembrokeshire Wales, United Kingdom	15.5 (51)	26 (85)	51°42′N 5°3′W	The Milford Haven Waterway, located in Pembrokeshire, Wales, is a naturally deep ria estuary formed by glacial flooding of the River Cleddau valley. It offers an average depth of approximately 15.5 m (51 ft), with maximum depths reaching around 27.5 m (90 ft) in the central channel. The waterway provides natural shelter and ample navigability for large vessels without requiring extensive dredging. Today, it supports one of the United Kingdom’s largest energy ports, handling liquefied natural gas (LNG), oil, and general cargo. The port is home to two liquefied natural gas terminals which collectively supply up to 25% of the UK's gas demand. Additionally, the waterway accommodates a variety of maritime activities, including defence operations, ferry services, and leisure boating.
Pago Pago Harbor	Pago Pago Tutuila Island, American Samoa	55 (180)	61 (200)	14°16′34.54″S 170°40′27.41″W	Pago Pago Harbor, located on the island of Tutuila in American Samoa, is recognised as one of the world's deepest natural harbours. The harbour has an average depth of approximately 55 m (180 ft), allowing it to accommodate a wide range of vessels. Depths within the harbour vary, with maximum depths reaching over 61 m (200 ft) in certain areas.
Port Angeles Harbor	Port Angeles Washington, United States	27 (89)	30 (98)	48°7′51″N 123°26′30″W	Port Angeles Harbor is a deep-water natural harbour located on the northern coast of the Olympic Peninsula in Washington, United States. Positioned on the southern side of the Strait of Juan de Fuca, it serves as a strategic maritime gateway to the Puget Sound and the broader Pacific Northwest. The harbour supports a variety of maritime activities, including cargo handling, shipbuilding, and ferry services. Its natural depth and sheltered location make it suitable for accommodating large vessels, contributing to the regional economy.
Port of Busan	Busan South Korea	15 (49)	18 (59)	35°5′N 129°2′E	The Port of Busan is South Korea's largest and busiest port, located on the southeastern coast in the city of Busan. It is a naturally deep harbour, with depths ranging from 15 m (49 ft) in the main channel to over 18 m (59 ft) at berths in the Busan New Port. Opened in 2006, the New Port was developed to accommodate the world's largest container vessels. While some dredging has occurred to optimise terminal operations, the port benefits from a naturally deep and sheltered coastal geography. It ranks among the world’s top ports by container throughput and is a major maritime hub in the Asia-Pacific.
Port of Cork	Ringaskiddy; Cobh; Cork (Republic of Ireland) Munster, Ireland	5.2 to 13.4 (17 to 44)	29 (95)	51°50′17.05″N 8°15′48.37″W	Cork Harbour, located in County Cork, Ireland, is one of the world's largest natural harbours by navigable area. It reaches a maximum natural depth of approximately 29 m (95 ft) near the mouth of the estuary, with berth depths ranging from 8.8 m (29 ft) to 13.4 m (44 ft) across terminals at Ringaskiddy, Cobh, and Cork City.
Port Jackson	Sydney New South Wales, Australia	13 (43)	46 (151)	33°51′23.87″S 151°14′20.84″E	Port Jackson, commonly known as Sydney Harbour, covers a catchment area of 55.7 km^{2} (21.5 sq mi) and receives inflows primarily from the Parramatta River and Lane Cove River. Known for its iconic landmarks, including the Sydney Opera House and Sydney Harbour Bridge, its deepest point lies between Dawes Point and Blues Point.
Port Klang	Port Klang; Klang; Kuala Lumpur Selangor, Malaysia	11.3 (37)	18 (59)	3°0′0″N 101°24′0″E	Port Klang, situated on the west coast of Malaysia at the mouth of the Klang River, is the nation's principal maritime gateway and one of the busiest ports in Southeast Asia. The harbour is naturally sheltered by surrounding islands, forming an enclosed basin that has been further enhanced to accommodate large vessels. The port comprises three main terminals: Northport, Southpoint, and Westports, each equipped to handle various cargo types, including containers, bulk, and liquid cargo. The main navigation channels have been dredged to depths of up to 18 m (59 ft), allowing access for Panamax and Capesize vessels.
Port of Mahón	Menorca, Balearic Islands, Spain	5 to 30 (16 to 98)	30 (98)	39°53′3.74″N 4°17′34.16″E	The narrow Port of Mahón is surrounded by the city of Mahón on the eastern coast of Menorca, Balearic Islands, Spain. Extending about 5 km (3.1 mi) inland, it is one of the longest natural harbours in the Mediterranean and historically significant for maritime trade and naval strategy, particularly contested by Britain, France, and Spain during the 18th century.
Port of Nacala	Nacala; Nacala-a-Velha Nampula Province, Mozambique	60 (200)	60 (200)	14°30′36.03″S 40°39′10.87″E	Port of Nacala, located on the northern coast of Mozambique, is widely regarded as Africa's deepest natural harbour. Situated within the sheltered Baía de Fernão Veloso, the port benefits from natural depths reaching up to 60 m (200 ft), with some inner areas of the bay reportedly descending to 99 m (325 ft). Unlike many major ports, Nacala’s significant depth is entirely natural, allowing it to accommodate large ocean-going vessels without the need for extensive dredging. This makes it an important deepwater gateway for inland countries such as Malawi and Zambia, and a strategic hub on the east coast of Africa.
Port of Narvik	Narvik Narvik Municipality, Norway	23.2 (76)	23.2 (76)	68°25′N 17°25′E	The Port of Narvik is Norway’s deepest natural harbour, located in the town of Narvik on the country's northwestern coast. Situated on the southern shore of Ofotfjorden, it benefits from natural depths of up to 23.2 m (76 ft), allowing it to accommodate large bulk carriers without the need for extensive dredging. The port operates year-round despite its Arctic location and is particularly significant for the export of Swedish iron ore via the Ofoten Line railway. Narvik’s sheltered position within the fjord system also provides natural protection from the open Norwegian Sea.
Port of Prince Rupert	Prince Rupert, British Columbia British Columbia, Canada	35 (115)	35 (115)	54°18′N 130°19′W	The Port of Prince Rupert, situated on the northwest coast of British Columbia, Canada, boasts the deepest natural harbour in North America, with depths reaching approximately 35 m (115 ft). This ice-free harbour operates year-round and can accommodate some of the largest vessels in global shipping. Its strategic location offers the shortest transpacific route between North America and Asia, enhancing its appeal for international trade.
Port of Santos	Santos; Guarujá São Paulo, Brazil	13 (43)	15 (49)	23°57′S 46°19′W	The Port of Santos is situated within a naturally protected estuarine system on the southeastern coast of Brazil, bordered by the cities of Santos and Guarujá. While the port has been extensively dredged and expanded, its origins lie in a deep and sheltered bay, with natural depths reaching approximately 13 to 15 m (43 to 49 ft). Today, Santos is the busiest container port in Latin America and a major gateway for Brazilian exports, including coffee, soy, and sugar.
Port of Shanghai	Shanghai Shanghai Municipality, China	15.3 m (50 ft)	17.5 m (57 ft)	31°22′30″N 121°34′46″E	The Port of Shanghai is the world's busiest container port, handling over 43 million TEUs annually. It comprises several port areas, including the deep-sea Yangshan Port, which boasts natural depths of up to 17.5 m (57 ft), allowing it to accommodate the largest container ships. The port's strategic location at the mouth of the Yangtze River makes it a critical gateway for international trade.
Port of Tacoma	Tacoma Washington, United States	15.2 (50)	15.5 (51)	47°15′N 122°26′W	The Port of Tacoma, located on Commencement Bay in southern Puget Sound, is one of the largest deep-water ports on the U.S. West Coast. With natural depths ranging from 14 to 15.5 m (46 to 51 ft), the harbour supports some of the world’s largest container and Ro-Ro vessels. The port forms part of the Northwest Seaport Alliance with Seattle, enhancing its strategic value for Pacific trade routes.
River Derwent	Hobart Tasmania, Australia	20 to 30 (66 to 98)	50 (160)	42°54′26.84″S 147°22′37.66″E	At its estuary near Hobart, the capital city of the Australian island-state of Tasmania, the River Derwent reaches its deepest point near the Tasman Bridge, before flowing into Storm Bay and D'Entrecasteaux Channel. Framed by kunanyi / Mount Wellington, the harbour has become a destination for international cruise ships, scientific vessels, and ocean racing yachts. Hobart is one of only five recognised Antarctic gateway cities, and the River Derwent serves as a vital logistics and resupply base for Antarctic expeditions operated by Australia, Russia, China, India, France, and Italy.
Scapa Flow	Kirkwall; Stromness; Lyness; St Margaret’s Hope Orkney Islands, Scotland	30 to 40 (98 to 131)	60 (200)	58°53′1.12″N 3°3′7.7″W	Scapa Flow, located in the Orkney Islands of Scotland, is one of the world’s largest and most sheltered natural harbours. Enclosed by several islands including Mainland, Hoy, and South Ronaldsay, it covers an area of approximately 324.5 km^{2} (125.3 sq mi). The harbour has an average depth of 30–40 m (98–131 ft), with maximum depths reaching up to 60 m (200 ft) in certain areas. Its expansive size and natural depth have historically allowed it to accommodate large naval fleets, making it a strategic base for the British Royal Navy during both World Wars. It supports commercial shipping, oil and gas transfers, and renewable energy projects.
Saldanha Bay	Western Cape, South Africa	23.2 (76)	23.7 (78)	32°59′S 17°58′E	Saldanha Bay, located on the west coast of South Africa approximately 105 km (65 mi) northwest of Cape Town, features a natural depth of up to 23.7 m (78 ft), enabling it to accommodate Cape-size bulk carriers and Very Large Ore Carriers (VLOCs) without the need for extensive dredging. The harbour hosts a major iron ore export terminal, connected via a dedicated rail line from the Sishen mines in the Northern Cape, along with a multi-purpose terminal and a crude oil berth. Its turning basin measures 580 m (1,900 ft) in diameter and maintains a depth of approximately 23.2 m (76 ft).
Trincomalee Harbour	Trincomalee Eastern Province, Sri Lanka	20 to 40 (66 to 131)	40 (130)	8°33′N 81°13′E	Trincomalee Harbour, located on the northeastern coast of Sri Lanka, is one of the world's largest natural harbours by area and depth. It encompasses over 1,600 ha (4,000 acres) of sheltered water and features a well-protected anchorage with depths ranging from 20 to 40 m (66 to 131 ft), accommodating large naval and commercial vessels. Although a submarine canyon just beyond the mouth of the harbour reaches depths exceeding 1,000 m (3,300 ft), this lies outside the navigable limits of the harbour proper and is not typically included in port depth comparisons. The harbour’s natural depth, enclosed topography, and strategic position in the Indian Ocean have historically made it a vital military and commercial asset.
Victoria Harbour	Hong Kong Island; Kowloon Hong Kong	12.2 (40)	43 (141)	22°17′N 114°10′E	Victoria Harbour is a deep natural harbour situated between Hong Kong Island and Kowloon, and was instrumental in the establishment of Hong Kong as a British colony in 1841. Its deep, sheltered waters were ideal for anchorage and trade, and continue to support a major international port. The harbour has an average depth of approximately 12.2 m (40 ft), with a maximum depth of around 43 m (141 ft) at Lei Yue Mun.
Visakhapatnam Port	Visakhapatnam Andhra Pradesh, India	16.5 (54)	17 (56)	17°41′23.18″N 83°17′56.19″E	Visakhapatnam Port is India's deepest natural port, located on the east coast in Andhra Pradesh. It has an average depth of 16 m (52 ft), with its deepest points exceeding 16.5 m (54 ft), enabling it to handle large vessels. Sheltered by Dolphin’s Nose Hill, it serves as a key maritime hub, handling coal, iron ore, crude oil, and containerised cargo for domestic and international trade.
