= Beira Railroad Corporation =

Railway company in Mozambique

The Beira Railroad Corporation, (Companhia dos Caminhos de Ferro da Beira in Portuguese) or CCFB, was a joint venture railway company that was responsible for operating the railway lines in central Mozambique. It was formed to reform the railway lines that run from the Port of Beira, Mozambique, originally linking to Zimbabwe, although it later also linked to Malawi.

Formed in 2005, it was made up of 51% of Ricon's capital (a consortium of Indian state-owned companies Rites and Ircon International), and 49% of state-owned Mozambique Ports and Railways (CFM). Its concession was revoked in 2011 for non-compliance with contractual obligations.

== History ==
The Beira railway has two major segments, the Machipanda line to Zimbabwe, and the Sena line to the coal fields of Moatize with further connection to Malawi.

In 2005, the Mozambican government privatized the stretch between the cities of Beira and Machipanda, part of the Beira-Bulawayo Railway (or Machipanda line). The privatization contract required the winning company to renovate the railway (which was destroyed by the 1977-2002 civil war), in addition to carrying out periodic maintenance of infrastructure and transporting cargo and passengers between the aforementioned cities.

The winning company was Ricon (a consortium of Indian state-owned companies Rail India Technical and Economic Service and Ircon International). An agreement was signed to create a joint venture company, Beira Railroad Corporation (CCFB). Ricon would hold 51% of the capital of CCFB, while 49% would belong to state-owned Mozambique Ports and Railways (CFM).

In 2011, CCFB's concession was revoked for non-compliance with contractual obligations and for failures in the works. The CCFB Concession was returned to CFM.

== See also ==
- Benguela railway
- Congo Railway
- History of rail transport in Mozambique
- Malawi Railways
- National Railways of Zimbabwe
- Railway stations in Mozambique
- Transport in Mozambique
- Zambia Railways
