= Charre, Mozambique =

Town in Mozambique, bordering Malawi

Charre
- Town
- Location within Mozambique
- Coordinates: 17°19′11″S 35°09′17″E
- Country: Mozambique
- Province: Tete
- Time zone: UTC+2:00 (CAT)

Charre is a town in northern Mozambique, near the border with Malawi.

== Transport ==
It is served by a station on the branchline of the national railway network that leads into Malawi.

== See also ==
- Railway stations in Mozambique
- Railway stations in Malawi
