= Mwanza, Malawi =

Town in Malawi

Mwanza
- Location in Malawi
- Coordinates: 15°35′55″S 34°31′04″E
- Country: Malawi
- Region: Southern Region
- District: Mwanza District
- Elevation: 2,054 ft (626 m)

Population (2018 Census)
  - Total: 18,039
- Time zone: +2
- Climate: Aw

Mwanza is a town in Malawi on the border with Mozambique. It is the administrative headquarters for Mwanza District.

== Location ==
Mwanza is the largest commercial, political and administrative urban centre of Mwanza District, in the Southern Region of Malawi. It lies on the important road from Blantyre to Tete in Mozambique, approximately 100 kilometres (62 mi), by road, northwest of Blantyre, Malawi's commercial capital. The geographical coordinates of Mwanza, Malawi are:15°35'55.0"S, 34°31'04.0"E (Latitude:-15.598611; Longitude:34.517778). The town sits at an average elevation of 626 metres (2,054 ft) above sea level.

== Population ==
The national census and household survey conducted in 2018, enumerated the population of Mwanza, Malawi at 18,039 inhabitants. The majority of people in the town and the district belong to the Chewa ethnic group.

== Economy ==
The town is a market town for local produce, including honey, as well as a distribution market for commercial products and processed foods, such as maize flour. Mwanza also acts as a transshipment point for goods going down the Zambeze River via Tete. It is also a centre for smuggling. In 2007, Ethiopian illegal immigrants were discovered hidden in an oil tanker at Mwanza, Malawi, at the border with Mozambique, on their way to South Africa. In July 2012, 49 Ethiopian and Somali nationals drowned in Lake Malawi when the boat in which they were attempting to cross the lake capsized. The group which started in Tanzania, had intended to cross into Mozambique and finally to South Africa.

== Infrastructure ==
Mwanza has an airstrip with a 1,000 metres (3,281 ft) long runway. It has both primary and secondary schools as well as a hospital. Mwanza District Hospital serves not only the local district, but also neighbouring Chikwawa District and Neno District in Malawi and the town of Zobue and Moatize District across the border in Mozambique.

The town has a railway station on the Nacala railway, under concession of Central East African Railways. The town of Mwanza has one of the most important railway stations on the Nacala railway, linking Moatize and Cana-Cana (west) to Nkaya and Port of Nacala (east).
