= Port of Nacala =

Location
- Country: Mozambique
- Location: Nacala; Nacala-a-Velha
- Coordinates: 14°32′S 40°39′E
- UN/LOCODE: MZMNC

Details
- Opened: 1932; 93 years ago
- Operated by: CLIN
- Type of harbour: Natural

Statistics
- Website

The Port of Nacala, also called the Nacala port complex, is a Mozambican port located in the cities of Nacala and Nacala-a-Velha. Is the deepest port in Southern Africa. The natural deep harbour serves landlocked Malawi with a 931-kilometre (578 mi) railway.

The infrastructure belongs to the Mozambican government, which is responsible for its administration through the public-private joint venture company "Integrated Northern Logistical Corridor Society" (CLIN). CLIN was created to administer licenses for cargo terminals in addition to passenger terminals.

== Terminals ==
There are four general cargo berths and one container berth. In January 2016 a coal terminal was completed in the town of Nacala-a-Velha, across the bay from the commercial port, and exports coal from the Moatize mine in western Mozambique.

== Railway ==
The Nacala railway system connects Moatize and Chipata, Zambia, through Malawi with the Port of Nacala. The railway system also connects Nampula, Malema, and Cuamba. In Cuamba, there is a junction which goes northeast to Lichinga. The line continues to Nayuchi, where it enters Malawi, and to Nkaya, where it divides, one branch going west to Mchinji and Chipata, and the other branch south to Moatize. The Mozambique government and Vale jointly created the Integrated Northern Logistical Corridor Society, to rehabilitate most of the existing line and build greenfield sections, a work completed in 2017, to export coal from mines in western Mozambique.

== Countries served ==
- Northern areas of the Mozambique
- The country of Malawi: the Port of Nacala is the nearest port to the landlocked country
- A railway extension serves parts of Zambia, in particular the inland port of Chipata

== See also ==
- Railway stations in Mozambique
- List of ports in Mozambique
- List of deepest natural harbours
