= Malawi Railways =

Former government corporation running Malawi's rail network

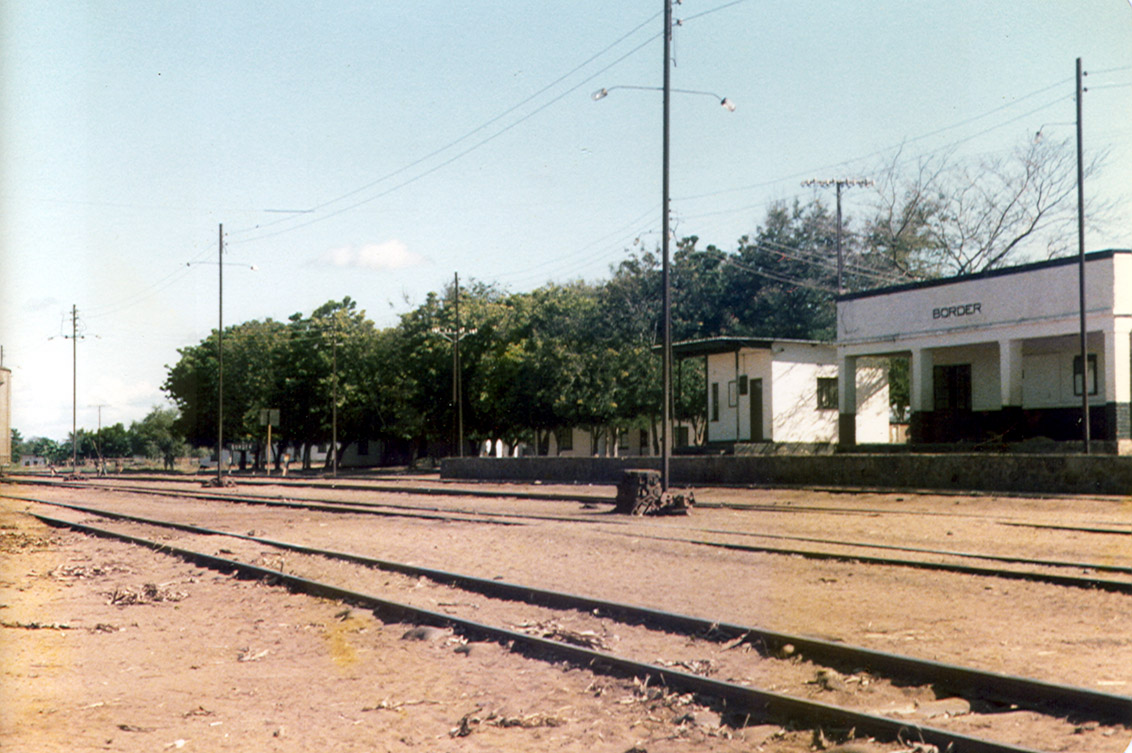
Malawian rail station near the border to Mozambique, 1984

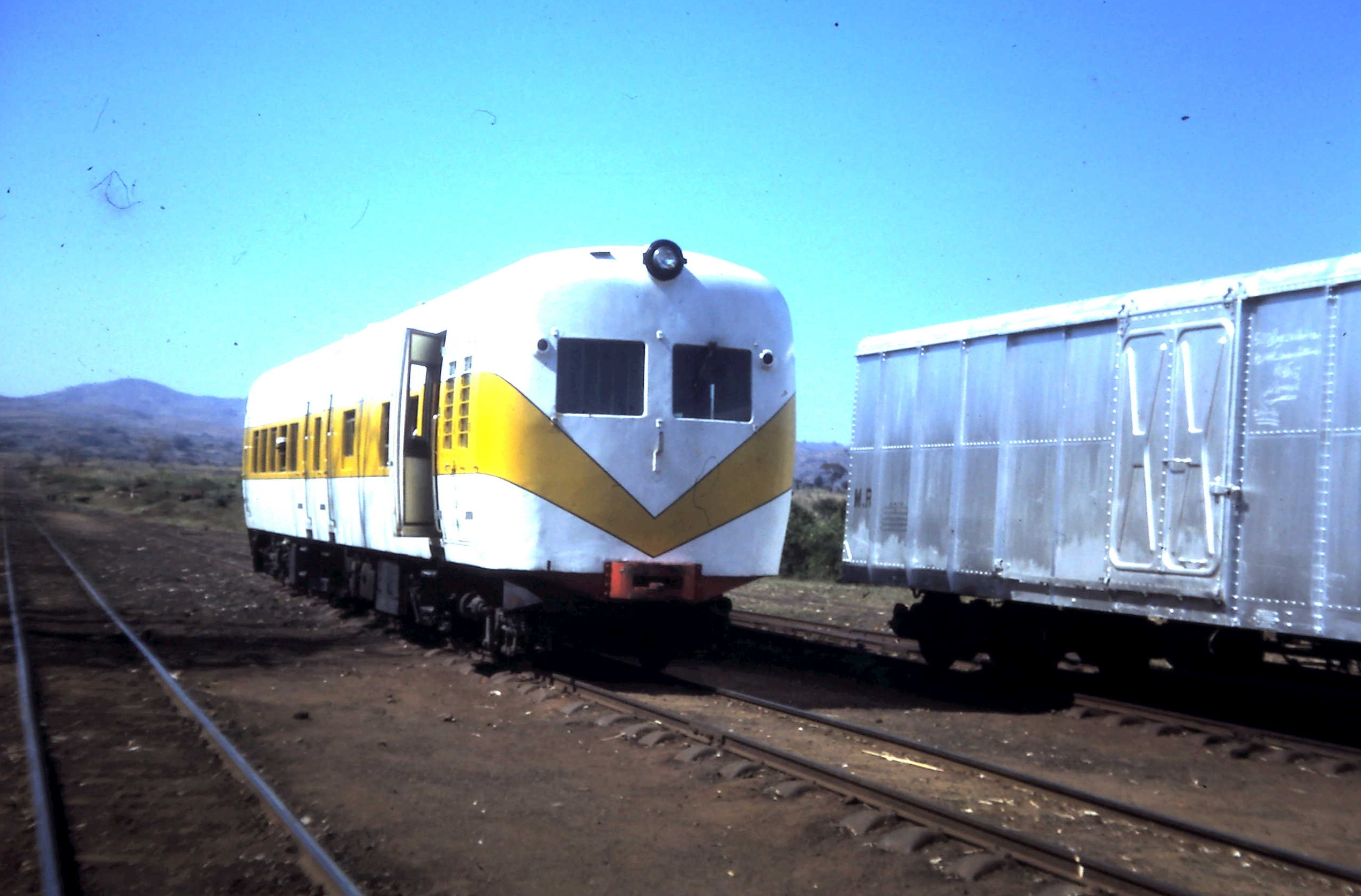
Malawi Railways diesel railcar, 1984

Malawi Railways was a government corporation that ran the national rail network of Malawi, Africa, until privatisation in 1999. With effect from 1 December 1999, the Central East African Railways consortium led by Railroad Development Corporation won the right to operate the network. This was the first rail privatisation in Africa which did not involve a parastatal operator.

== History ==
Upon achieving independence in 1964, Malawi, which had previously been the British protectorate of Nyasaland, inherited a network of three railways. They were the Shire Highlands Railway from Salima, on Lake Malawi, via Blantyre to Port Herald (now Nsanje) on the Shire River; the Central African Railway from Port Herald to Vila Fontes (now Caia), in Portuguese Mozambique; and the Trans-Zambezia Railway, from Vila Fontes to Beira, also in Portuguese Mozambique. The network was run as a single, integrated Malawian system, even though the Trans-Zambezia Railway was located entirely on foreign territory.

All of these lines were narrow gauge and single track, and the Shire Highlands Railway in particular had sharp curves and steep gradients, so the system was inadequate for heavy train loads. Maintenance costs were high and freight volumes were low, so freight rates were up to three times those of Rhodesian and East African lines. Although costly and inefficient, the rail link to Beira remained a main bulk transport link until 1979 when it was destroyed by RENAMO forces in the civil war. By then, Malawi had its second rail link to the Mozambique port of Nacala, which is its principal route for imports and exports today.

From 1974 to 1979, Malawi worked with the Canadian International Development Agency (CIDA) sponsored to build 110 kilometres (70 mi) of new track from Salima to Lilongwe though the Malawi-Canada Railway Project.

== Present day overview ==
The 797 km (495 mi) 1,067 mm (3 ft 6 in) gauge line extends from the Zambian border at Mchinji in the west via Lilongwe to Blantyre and Makhanga in the south. At Nkaya Junction it links with the Nacala line going east via Nayuchi to Mozambique's deepwater port at Nacala on the Indian Ocean. The link south from Makhanga to Mozambique's Beira corridor has been closed since the Mozambique Civil War, with plans for reconstruction not yet realised.

An extension from Mchinji to Chipata in Zambia opened in 2010, and there is a proposal to eventually link up from there with the TAZARA railway at Mpika.

Freight traffic is predominantly exports through Nacala, including sugar, tobacco, pigeon peas and tea. Import traffic consists of fertiliser, fuel, containerised consumer goods and food products including vegetable oil and grain. A government subsidised passenger rail service operates twice weekly from Blantyre to the border with Mozambique at Nayuchi.

The Rivirivi Bridge was damaged by Cyclone Delfina in January 2003 and reopened in 2005.

Nacala Port and Railway was concessioned to the same CEAR consortium in January 2005.

In July 2006, the Republic of China (Taiwan) sent 4 R20 series (EMD G12) diesel electric locomotives R56, R57, R58 and R59 to Malawi Railways. Two of them are used as shunters and the other two have never been used.

== See also ==
- Rail transport in Malawi
- Railway stations in Malawi
- Transport in Malawi
