= Gelo, Mozambique =

Town in Nampula Province, Mozambique

Gelo
- Town
- Location within Mozambique
- Coordinates: 14°55′26″S 39°58′31″E
- Country: Mozambique
- Province: Nampula
- Time zone: UTC+2:00 (CAT)

Gelo is a town in Mozambique near the port of Nacala in the Nampula region.

Gelo is served by a station on the Nacala Railway in the north of Mozambique.

== See also ==
- Railway stations in Mozambique
