= Nacala Logistics Corridor =

The Nacala Logistics Corridor is a logistical mega-enterprise for connecting areas in Southeast Africa, which includes the creation and management of railways, highways, ports and airports, which directly serve Mozambique and Malawi, and indirectly serve Zambia and Zimbabwe.

The primary focus is the transport of coal from mines in western Mozambique east to the port of Nacala via Malawi. The enterprise included both construction of new trackage and the rebuilding of existing lines.

In 2010, Brazilian mining company Vale purchased a majority stake in Nacala railway (Mozambique) and Malawian railroad Central East African Railways as the beginning phase of a project to develop rail access from the deepwater port at Nacala to the company's mines near Moatize, Mozambique. In December 2011, Vale contracted with the government of Malawi to rebuild the trackage in the country and construct 136 kilometres (85 mi) of new railroad from Cambulatsissi on the western border of Malawi to Nkaya, where it would connect with the existing line. In July 2012, Vale entered into a partnership with the Mozambican state company Mozambique Ports and Railways (CFM) to improve the existing CDN line—formally named the Nacala Logistics Corridor, the name eventually referred to the entire project in both countries. To this end, mining company Vale, CFM and Malawi companies agreed on the creation of the Northern Development Corridor Society (CLIN) joint venture to manage the logistics equipment in the Nacala Corridor.

Initial estimates placed the cost of the project, arranged as an 80/20 partnership between Vale and CFM, respectively, at US$1.1 billion. The first test trains began operating over the line in November 2014, and regular service began the following year. In late 2016, the Siemens-designed positive train control system came online, allowing train frequency to increase with coal production. In May 2017, a ceremony in Nacala marked the formal completion of the line, by which time 22 daily coal trains were operating over the route. By the time of its completion, the total cost of the line had risen to US$4.4 billion.

The Nacala Logistics Corridor has a total of 912 kilometres (567 mi) of trackage, all of which uses a 1,067 mm gauge. It operates 85 General Electric Dash 9-BBW locomotives and 1,962 individual pieces of rolling stock.
