= Zambeze mine =

Coal mine in Tete, Tete Province, Mozambique

Zambeze Coal Mine
- Location: Tete, Tete Province, Mozambique
- Products: Coking coal
- Company: Riversdale Mining

The Zambeze Coal Mine is a coal mine located in Tete, Changara District, Tete Province. The mine has coal reserves amounting to nine billion tonnes of coking coal, one of the largest coal reserves in Africa and the world.
