= Macarretane =

Town in Gaza Province, Mozambique

- Location within Mozambique
- Coordinates: 24°23′38″S 32°51′52″E
- Country: Mozambique
- Provinces: Gaza Province

Macarretane is a town located in southern Mozambique.

Nearby is the Macarretane Dam, which dams the Limpopo River. It was constructed to maintain the water flow levels of the Chokwé irrigation system.

== Transport ==
It lies on the mainline of the southern system of Mozambique Railways, where the railway bridges the Limpopo River.

== See also ==
- Transport in Mozambique
- Railway stations in Mozambique
