= Independent Party of Mozambique =

The Independent Party of Mozambique (Portuguese: Partido Independente de Moçambique, PIMO) is a political party in Mozambique. The party was founded in 1993, it was reportedly intended to be named 'Mozambique Islamic Party', but since national legislation prohibits religious political parties the name was adjusted to 'Independent'. Yaqub Sibindy is the chairman of the party.

PIMO won individual seats in Nampula, Cuamba and Angoche during the 2003 municipal elections. At the time it was the sole opposition party outside the Renamo-led coalition to build a party structure. At the 2004 legislative elections the party won 0.6% of the popular vote and no seats. Its presidential candidate, Yaqub Sibindy, won 0.9% of the popular vote.

In 2007 PIMO joined the Constructive Opposition Bloc, which was seen as a 'loyal opposition' grouping, and Sibindy became one of the main leaders of the bloc. After the formation of the bloc, Sibindy became a frequent invitee at presidential banquets and FRELIMO functions. In 2009 PIMO supported FRELIMO in the national elections.
