= Ezekiel Kalipeni =

Malawian-US geographer specialist on HIV/AIDS (1954–2020)

- Born: Ezekiel Kalipeni; February 4, 1954; Malawi
- Died: April 11, 2020 (aged 66); Malawi
- Occupation: Geographer

Ezekiel Kalipeni (February 4, 1954 – April 11, 2020) was a Malawian geographer who specialized in population and environmental studies, medical geography, and Third World development issues. His research focused on sub-saharan Africa and the spread of pandemics in developing countries. He is most well known for his work in mapping and spatial analysis of the HIV/AIDS epidemic in Africa. In 2014 he was recognized as the Kwado-Konadu-Agyemang Distinguished Scholar in African Geography by the American Association of Geographers.

== Biography ==
Kalipeni was born in Mchinji, Malawi. Kalipeni received a Bachelor of Arts in Social Science in 1979 from the University of Malawi. He also taught there from 1986 to 1988.

He moved to the United States of America in the 1980s for graduate studies. He received a master's degree and PhD in Population and Environmental Studies at the University of North Carolina at Chapel Hill. He worked at the National Science Foundation as the Director of the Geography and Spatial Sciences Program. He worked as a professor at the University of Malawi, Colgate University and University of Illinois, where he eventually retired. He also served as the editor of the African Geographical Review.

Kalipeni was the co-founder of the Kalipeni Foundation which he started with his wife, Fattima Kalipeni. The Kalipeni Foundation, is a non-profit organization focused on education and water projects in Luchenza, Malawi.

== Awards ==
- Kwado-Konadu-Agyemang Distinguished Scholar in African Geography Award 2014 - American Association of Geographers
- Best Paper of the Year 2012 - Journal of Map & Geography Libraries, Routledge

== Selected bibliography ==
- Krabacher, T.; Kalipeni, E. and Layachi, A. 2009. Global Issues: Africa. 12th edition. McGraw-Hill Contemporary Learning Series.
- Kalipeni, Ezekiel; Oppong, Joseph; Zerai, Assata (March 2007). "HIV/AIDS, gender, agency and empowerment issues in Africa". Social Science & Medicine. 64 (5): 1015–1018. doi:10.1016/j.socscimed.2006.10.010. PMID 17097787.
- Kalipeni, E.; Craddock, S.; Oppong, J. and Ghosh, J. Eds. 2004. HIV/AIDS in Africa: Beyond Epidemiology. Oxford: Blackwell Publishers
- Kalipeni, E. and Zeleza, P. T. Eds. 1999. Sacred Spaces and Public Quarrels: African Economic and Cultural Landscapes. Lawrenceville, NJ: Africa World Press
- Kalipeni, E. and Philip Thiuri. 1997. Issues and Perspectives on Health Care in Contemporary Sub-Saharan Africa. Lewiston, New York: Edwin Mellen Press
- Kalipeni, Ezekiel; Oppong, Joseph (1996). "Rethinking and Reappraising AIDS, Health Care Systems, and Culture in Sub-Saharan Africa—Introduction". African Rural and Urban Studies. 3 (2): 7–11.
- Kalipeni, E. 1994. Population Growth and Environmental Degradation in Southern Africa. Boulder, Colorado: Lynne Rienner Publishers
