= CLIN =

CLIN, or the Sociedade do Corredor Logístico Integrado do Norte (Integrated Northern Logistical Corridor Society), is a business company related to logistics, whose main business is railway management in Mozambique and Malawi. The company is a joint venture.

== History ==
In 1997 was formed a consortium between state owned Mozambique Ports and Railways (CFM) and the Sociedade de Desenvolvimento do Corredor de Nacala (SDCN), composed of American rail operator Railroad Development Corporation (RDC), mining company Edlow Resources, and various Mozambican interests. The company is structured so CFM controls 49% and SDCN 51%. It was founded in response to the Mozambican government's request for private operators to take control of the 1970s-built state owned Nacala railway, though negotiations took almost a decade and control was not handed over to SDCN until January 2005, at which time the company began rehabilitation of the west end of the rail line from Cuamba to the Malawi border and port improvements at Nacala. RDC had in the interim formed Central East African Railways (CEAR) in Malawi, with the goal of operating a single rail line from Mozambique west through Malawi and into Zambia. In 2008, RDC sold its stake in both CEAR and SDCN.

In 2009, Mozambique received a US$500 million investment from Denmark, the Netherlands, and the European Union to develop coal fields around Moatize in western Mozambique, with the majority of the money earmarked for improving SDCN trackage and constructing a new line through Malawi directly to Mozambican mines. In late 2010, Brazilian mining conglomerate Vale purchased a 51% stake of SDCN, giving it a majority share of both SDCN and CEAR, which had by then come under SDCN control as well. In 2012, Vale initiated a new joint venture with CFM, the "Integrated Northern Logistical Corridor Society" (for management of Nacala Logistics Corridor), to serve the Moatize coal mines—as part of the project, most of Nacala Railway line east of Malawi to Nacala was rebuilt to handle heavy coal traffic.

== Ownership ==
Vale, a Brazilian mining business, owns 80%; Caminhos de Ferro de Moçambique owns the other 20%. There are provisions for CFM to increase its stake. The total cost of the new railways and the new coal port would be around 1.5 billion dollars.

== Route ==
The new railway is planned to transport coal from Vale's mine at Moatize to a new coal terminal at the port of Nacala-a-Velha. Two new lines will be built, as well as the new coal port; one between Moatize and the Malawi border, and the other between Mossuril and Ponta Mamuaxi. Trains will pass through Malawi. Approximately 230 km of new track would be built, and 682 km of old track would be rehabilitated.

== Operations ==
CLIN would have an annual capacity of 40 million tonnes of coal per year. It is possible that the new infrastructure could be used to carry passenger trains in future.
