= Metocheria =

Town in Nampula Province, Mozambique

- Town
- Location within Mozambique
- Coordinates: 14°52′12″S 40°07′30″E
- Country: Mozambique
- Province: Nampula
- Time zone: UTC+2:00 (CAT)

Metocheria is a town in northern Mozambique, located in the Nampula Province.

== Transport ==
It is served by a station on the Nacala line of the state railway system.

== See also ==
- Railway stations in Mozambique
