= Gelo (disambiguation) =

Gelo, or Gelon (died 478 BC), was the ruler of Gela and Syracuse in the 5th century BC.

Gelo may also refer to:

- Gelo, son of Hiero II (died 216 BC) of Syracuse
- The Gelao people, a nationality of China
- Gelo Racing, a racing team named for Georg Loos (see German Wikipedia)
- Gelonus, a Scythian city
- Gelo, Mozambique, a number of towns in Mozambique
- Gelo di melone, a jellied watermelon pudding
- Gelo (film), a 2016 Indian film
- LiAngelo Ball (born 1998), American rapper and former basketball player, nicknamed "Gelo"
