= Memba Bay =

Bay in Nampula Province, Mozambique

- Baía de Memba (Portuguese)
- Location in Mozambique
- Coordinates: 14°11′S 40°34′E
- Ocean/sea sources: Indian Ocean
- Basin countries: Mozambique
- Max. length: 13 km (8.1 mi)
- Max. width: 14 km (8.7 mi)
- Settlements: Memba

Memba Bay (Portuguese: Baía de Memba) is a bay in Mozambique. It is located in Nampula Province, north of Fernao Veloso Bay, on the northern coast of Mozambique.

Currently the bay is a popular scuba diving area, with numerous diving spots.

== Geography ==
Memba Bay is open towards the east and is named after the town of Memba, Memba District, located in the bay. There are deep inlets in the southern shore of the inner bay.

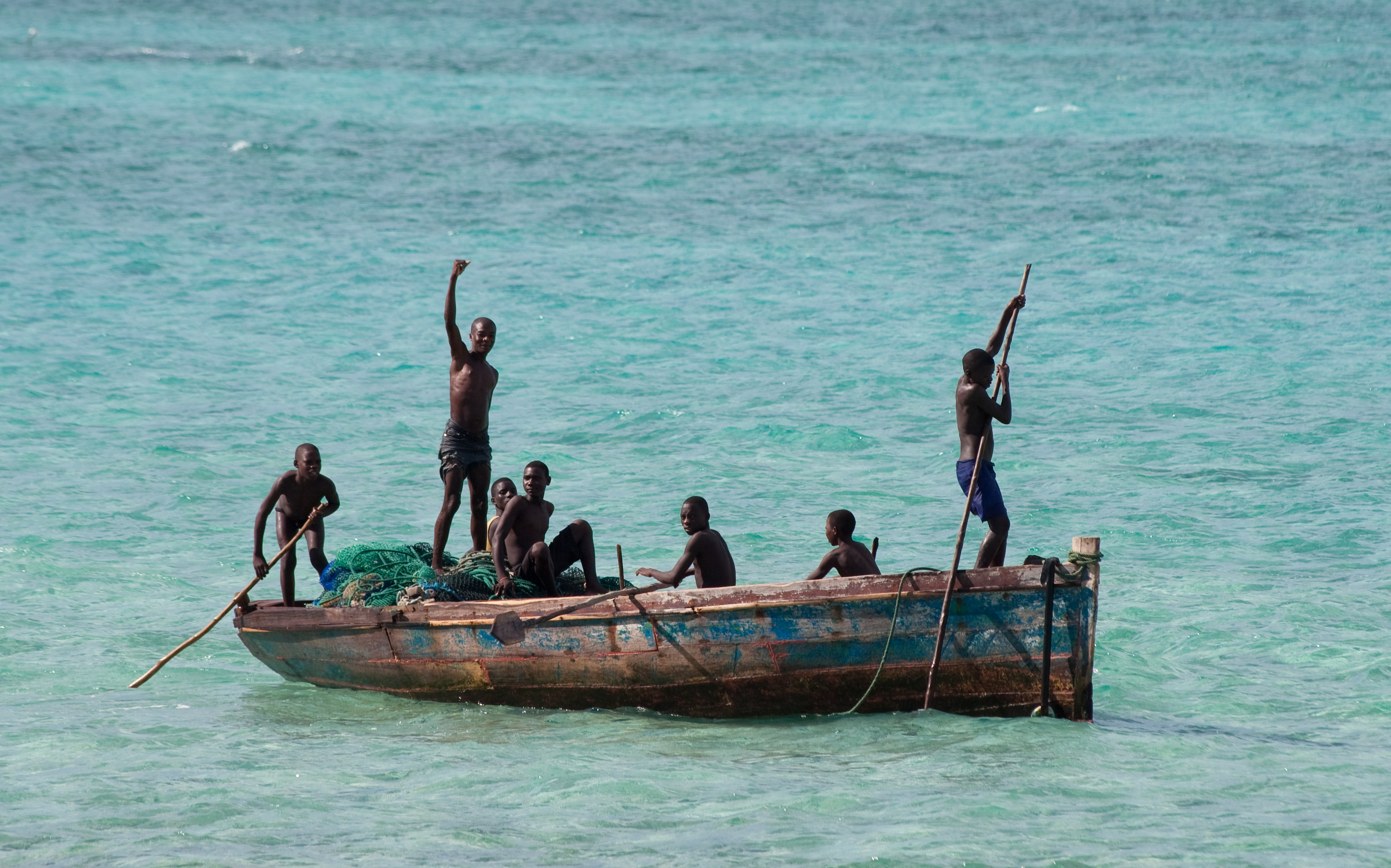
Fishermen in Memba Bay.

== See also ==
- Geography of Mozambique
