= Doa District =

District in Tete, Mozambique

Location of the district of Doa in Mozambique

Doa District is a district in Tete Province in the central region of Mozambique. It had a population of 87,077 in 2017.
