= Rail transport in Malawi =

Malawi Railways is the national rail network in Malawi, run by a government corporation until privatisation in 1999. As of 1 December 1999 the Central East African Railways, a consortium led by Railroad Development Corporation, won the right to operate the network.

The rail network totalled 797 kilometres in 2001. Like most railways in Southern Africa, it is entirely to Cape gauge, i.e. 1067 mm gauge.

== Railway links with adjacent countries ==
=== Mozambique ===
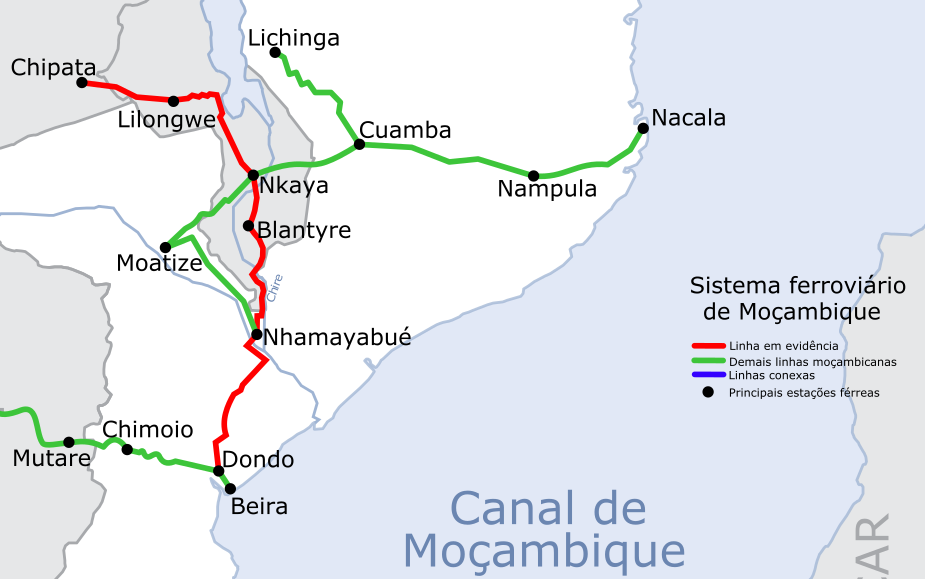
Sena Railway, connecting Zambia through Malawi to Mozambique

In the city of Nkaya there is an interconnection between the Nacala railway and the Sena railway. Through the Nacala railway, it is possible to access the Port of Nacala in the east, and in the northwest of Mozambique, in the Moatize coal mines. Via the Sena railway (or Shire Highlands railway), there is a connection between the cities of Mchinji, Lilongue, Salima, Nkaya, Blantyre, Nsanje, Nhamayabué, Dondo and Port of Beira.

The Nacala railway line (Nacala Corridor line) to Mozambique via Nkaya to the port of Nacala; by the Sena railway line, from Nkaya to the Nhamayabué (Dona Ana Bridge) and Beira, has not been operational since the war in Mozambique and is in need of reconstruction.

In April 2011, the Malawi government and the Brazilian mining company Vale signed an agreement to construct a 100 kilometres (62 mi) short cut railway line from coal mines in Moatize to Blantyre, where it would connect with tracks to the port of Nacala.

=== Tanzania and Zambia ===
In 2015, an extension of the Chipata line to a junction with the TAZARA line at Serenje was proposed. In 2016, the contract was awarded. There is no direct link with neighbouring Tanzania as there is a 1,067 mm (3 ft 6 in)/1,000 mm (3 ft 3 3/8 in) metre gauge break of gauge.

A rail link to Chipata in Zambia was completed in 1984, but a connection onward into Zambia was only opened in 2010. This line remains idle because there are few facilities at Chipata.

== See also ==
- Economy of Malawi
- History of rail transport in Malawi
- Transport in Malawi
