= Railway stations in Mozambique =

Railway stations in Mozambique include:

== Towns served by railways ==
(The lines do not all connect, or connect indirectly)

=== Northern system ===
(northernmost) (CDN) (from west to east)

- Nayuchi - Malawi - border town.
- Malema - way station
  - Ribaue
- Nampula - workshops
- Metocheria
- Gelo
- Monapo - junction
  - Nachicuva River
- Nacala - deep water port

- Monapo - junction
  - Lumbo - port

- Cuamba - junction to Lichinga
  - Lichinga - railhead

- (location unknown)
  - Namialo concrete sleeper plant.

(isolated line)

- Matiban

=== Zambezi system ===
(gauge unknown) - line sabotaged during civil war, and later pulled up for scrap.

- Quelimane - river port
- Nicoadala
- Namacurra
- Naciaia
- Mocuba - terminus (also called Vila de Mocuba)

(possible standard gauge)

- Tete - coal mines.
- Macuse - proposed coal export port. Near Quelimane.

=== Central system ===
The railway to Zimbabwe was originally 610 mm (2 ft) in 1890, but was converted to 1,067 mm (3 ft 6 in) in 1900.

( Zambezi valley )

- Beira - port
- Dondo - junction - cement works
- Muanza - limestone
- Inhaminga
- Inhamitanga - junction
- Caia - junction
- Vila de Sena - south side of bridge over Zambezi River
- Mutarara - north side of bridge - junction for Malawi
  - (Mozambique) Charre
  - (Mozambique) Manica - border
  - Mankhakwe, Malawi
- Kambulatsisi - junction
- Moatize - coal mines - railhead.

==== Proposed ====
- Tete - branch extension and proposed coal mine
- Cheringoma - timber

- Mutarara - north side of bridge - junction for Malawi
- Vila Nova da Fronteira - border with Malawi
- (Malawi) Nsanje

- Inhamitanga - junction
  - Marromeu - branch terminus - sugar (82 km) - restored Sep 2008
  - Valente

- Caia - junction
  - Valente - branch terminus

- Machipanda - (317 km)

- Dondo - junction - cement works
- (Mozambique) Chimoio
- (Mozambique) Manica
- Mutare (Umtali before 1982), Zimbabwe - workshops
- (Zimbabwe) Rusape

=== Southern system ===
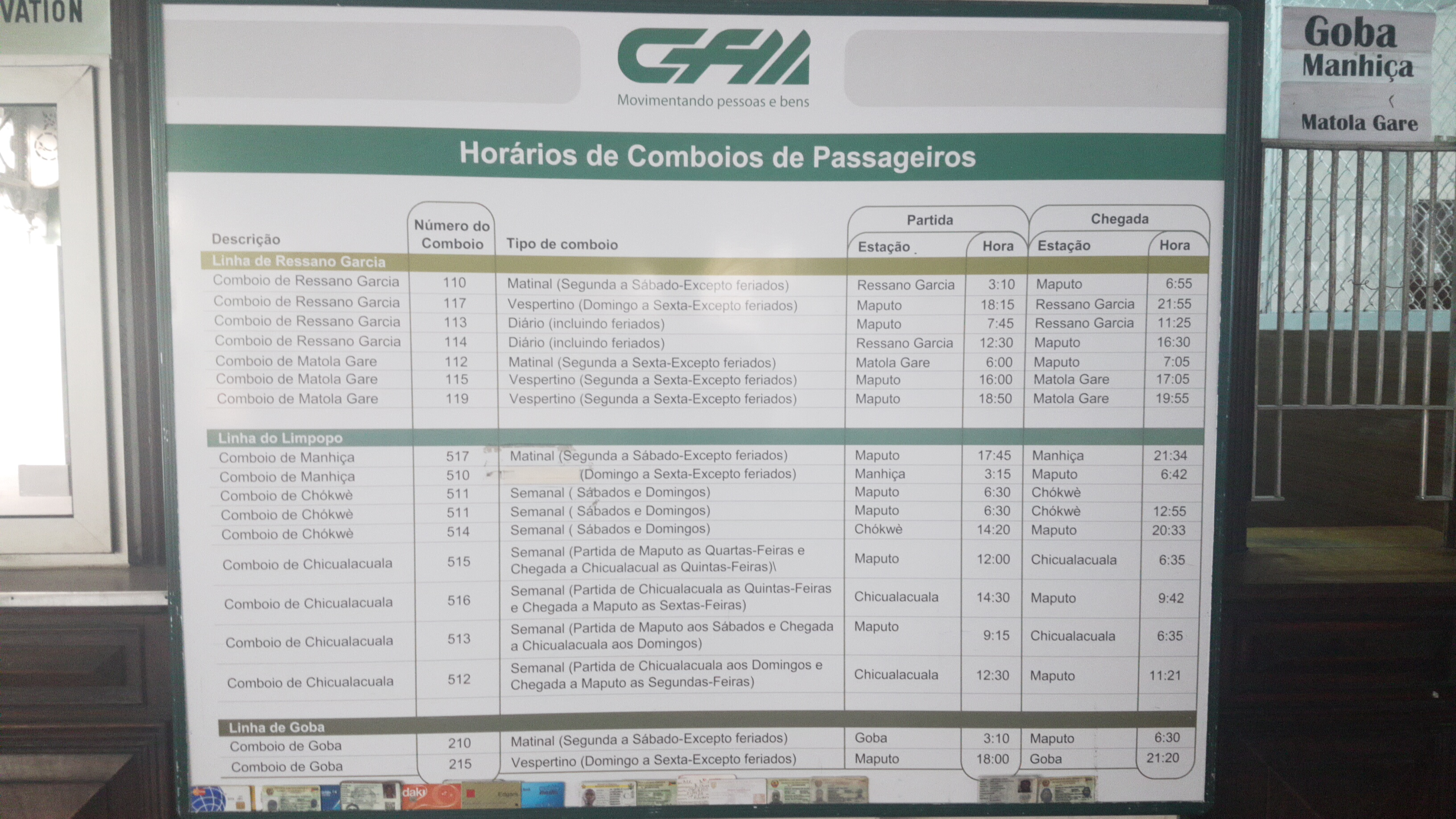
Train timetable of Maputo

- (Zimbabwe) Sango - border station
- Chicualacuala (formerly Malvernia) - border with Zimbabwe
- Mapai
- Guiga
- Manhiça
- Chokwé - way station
- Mabalane - way station
- Combomune - way station
- Mpuzi
- Magude - river crossing and junction
- Macarretane - river crossing
- Maputo - port - national capital
- Tenga - site of serious accident
- Muxia - junction
- Goba - to be restored 2008, on the border with Eswatini
- Ressano Garcia - on the border with South Africa
- (South Africa) Komatipoort - 90 km
- Matola - coal export port
- Salamanga - branch terminus

=== Southeast ===
- Xai-Xai - river port - 762 mm (2 ft 6 in) gauge
- Manjacaze - junction
- Maroa - terminus
- Chicome - branch terminus

=== Eastern ===
( 762 mm (2 ft 6 in) gauge - defunct )

- Inhambane - port
- Inharrime - terminus

=== Approved ===
- Matutuine - new coal port approved October 2009

=== Proposed ===
- Tete - coal mining

- (145 km or 90 mi short-cut)
- (Malawi) Blantyre
- (Mozambique) Moatize

- 1,435 mm (4 ft 8 1/2 in) standard gauge
- A local subsidiary of Kazakhstan-based Eurasian Natural Resources Corp has commissioned Mott MacDonald to undertake studies and is seeking expressions of interest in building a 1200 km line from Chiuta in Tete province to a new port at Nacala, bypassing Malawi. The line would be available to third parties, and a passenger service.
- Moatize - coal
- Caia
- Quelimane
- Nacala - port

- Ludewa - coal
- Njombe - coal
- Mtwara - port in south

=== Possible ===
- Serule, Botswana
- (Mozambique) Techobanine deepwater port.

== See also ==
- Transport in Mozambique
- Railway stations in Malawi

== Maps ==
- UN Map
- UNHCR Altas Map (2005)
- Map Port Nacala railhead - shows line through Malawi to Chipata, Zambia.
- Southern Africa
- Sena Railway
