= Esther Jolobala =

Malawian politician

The Honourable Esther Jolobala MP

Member of Parliament for Machinga East
- Incumbent
- Assumed office 2014

Personal details
- Born: Nayuchi, Malawi
- Party: United Democratic Front

Esther Jolobala is a Malawian politician who has served in the Parliament of Malawi since 2014, representing the Machinga East constituency as a member of the United Democratic Front. In 2024, she was the UDF's spokesperson and she was re-elected as an MP in 2025 to become the second deputy speaker.

== Background ==
Esther Jolobala was born in the town of Nayuchi in the Machinga District of Malawi. She was the seventh of eleven children.

== Political career ==
In the 2014 Malawian general election, Jolobala was elected to represent the Machinga East constituency as an independent in the National Assembly of Malawi. She is a Christian and her voters are mostly muslim.

At some point after her election, Jolobala switched parties to the United Democratic Front, which sat in government due to an electoral alliance with the ruling Democratic Progressive Party. Jolobala was re-elected in the 2019 Malawian general election, receiving 23,363 votes; her next closest opponent, Thomas Kenneth Kamu of the DPP, received 6,025 votes.

As of 2022, Jolobala is a member of the Natural Resources and Climate Change Committee and serves as the Shadow Minister of Gender in the opposition. She was previously a member of the Rural and Local Development Committee and the HIV/AIDS and Nutrition Committee, serving as vice chair of the latter. Additionally, Jolobala is a member of the Malawi Parliamentary Women's Caucus and the Parliamentary Conservation Caucus. In March 2022, she served as one of Malawi's representatives to the 144th assembly of the Inter-Parliamentary Union.

During her tenure in parliament, Jolobala has served an advocate for the improvement of Malawi's infrastructure. In December 2018, Jolobala alleged that the DPP government was prioritizing road projects in DPP constituencies in spite of failing infrastructure in the rest of the country. In 2021, she stated that the Nayuchi-Nsanama road had become so heavily damaged that residents were forced to rely on a twice-a-week train in order to conduct business or to receive healthcare, as even ambulances were unable to traverse the road. Jolobala supported a 2022 emergency power restoration bill which allowed the government to borrow funds from the International Development Association in order to repair the Kapichira Hydroelectric Power Station, which had been damaged by Tropical Storm Ana. Later that year, she sided with the Malawi Congress Party government regarding immigration, stating that an influx of unskilled foreign nationals were taking jobs from Malawian workers. During her tenure, Jolobala has also supported increasing the number of polling places in rural constituencies, and advocated for the removal of a surtax on internet services, stating that the tax makes internet unaffordable for a majority of Malawians.

Jolobala is also a prominent opponent of the persecution of albinos. She has decried attacks and kidnappings of albinos, and criticized the Malawi Police Service for delayed or limited responses to crimes against albinos. In 2016, she introduced a bill which would increase the penalties of crimes against albinos, though the bill was not ultimately drafted by the Ministry of Justice.

On 9 December 2019, during an argument with a Machinga District Commissioner regarding the distribution of water pumps, Jolobala grabbed the commissioner by the necktie and forced him against a wall. Jolobala was arrested and charged the following day with breaching the peace. In 2024, Jolobala was the UDF's spokesperson. Later that year, she gave a speech criticizing President Lazarus Chakwera, accusing him of ignoring the rule of law and stating that political interference was undermining Malawi's institutions.

She was re-elected for Machinga East in 2025 and she became the house's second deputy speaker. She spoke out at an event in Khadija Chunga's constituency where the Malawi Parliamentary Women's Caucus was joined by their opposite numbers in Zambia, Mozambique and Zimbabwe in May 2026. She called on her country's electors to create more women MPs, noting that Patricia Kaliati was now serving her fifth term. She has helped to open new primary and secondary schools in order to reduce children's travel distances to schools and supported law reform allowing both men and women to be registered land owners, countering the problem where by a widow loses her home if her husband dies.
