= Riversdale Mining =

Australian mining company

Riversdale Mining Ltd
- Type: Public
- Traded as: ASX: RIV
- Headquarters: Sydney, Australia
- Revenue: A$97.5M

Riversdale Mining is an Australian mining company, listed on the S&P/ASX 200. It specialises in coal mines in Africa.

Tata Steel owned a stake of approximately 24% in Riversdale; Passport Capital and Brazilian steelmaker CSN also have a stake. In April 2010, Rio Tinto Group gained a majority stake.

== Operations ==
In June 2010, Riversdale Mining signed an agreement with Wuhan Iron and Steel to jointly develop Riversdale's Zambeze coal reserves in Mozambique, one of the world's largest undeveloped coking coal areas; Wuhan will also buy coal from Riversdale's nearby Benga mines. The Benga mines are expected to produce 20 million tonnes per year. These mines are near Moatize in Mozambique.

Riversdale also has the Zululand anthracite mine in northern KwaZulu Natal in South Africa.

== Takeover ==
Riversdale has been in takeover talks with Rio Tinto, valuing it at A$3.5 billion; the government of India has also considered bidding.
