= Chinese people in Malawi =

Regions with significant populations
- Blantyre, Lilongwe, Zomba, Mzuzu

Related ethnic groups
- Overseas Chinese

There is a small community of Chinese people in Malawi made up largely of entrepreneurs and merchants running an estimated 140 businesses across Malawi in 2012.

== History ==
The number of Chinese owned businesses, restaurants, and shops grew when Malawi embarked on official diplomatic relations with the People's Republic of China in 2007. Protests demanding a ban on Chinese merchants in the northern city of Karonga led by a local business woman in 2012 spread throughout the country. The government in response passed a law with Chinese merchants in mind that prohibited foreign traders from operating in small towns and rural areas, limiting Chinese businesses to the 4 major cities of Blantyre, Lilongwe, Zomba, Mzuzu.

== Anti-Chinese violence ==
A fear of ethnically directed violence is a part of life for Chinese business people with rumors often circulating of planned attacks against Chinese. This unstable climate has caused Chinese business owners to withdraw from public life, staffing their shops with local employees while infrequently visiting to restock. The Chinese community often seeks shelter in the capital of Lilongwe when rumors of attacks circulate.

Local civil rights groups, Centre for Development of People and the Centre for Human Rights Rehabilitation, were critical of the ban on Chinese merchants, calling the law xenophobic and fearing it would encourage attacks on the Chinese.
