= Saverio Valente =

Argentine footballer

Saverio Valente (born January 24, 1962) is an Argentine former footballer who played as a midfielder.

== Career ==
Valente played in the Argentine Primera División in 1983 with Boca Juniors. He made his debut for Boca Juniors on September 21, 1983, against Club Atlético Huracán. In 1985, he played with Club Atlético Temperley. In 1990, he played in the National Soccer League with Toronto Italia.
