= Chiuta, Mozambique =

Region in Tete Province, Mozambique

Chiuta
- Region
- Etymology: Supreme Being (Chewa)
- Location within Mozambique
- Coordinates: 15.546314°S 33.283768°E
- Country: Mozambique
- Province: Tete Province
- Time zone: UTC+2:00 (CAT)

Chiuta is a region in the Tete Province of Mozambique, named after its "mountain." The administrative center is Manje, approximately 120 km to the west of Tete city. Chiuta is the Chewa name for the Supreme Being.
