= Monapo =

Town in northern Mozambique

- Town
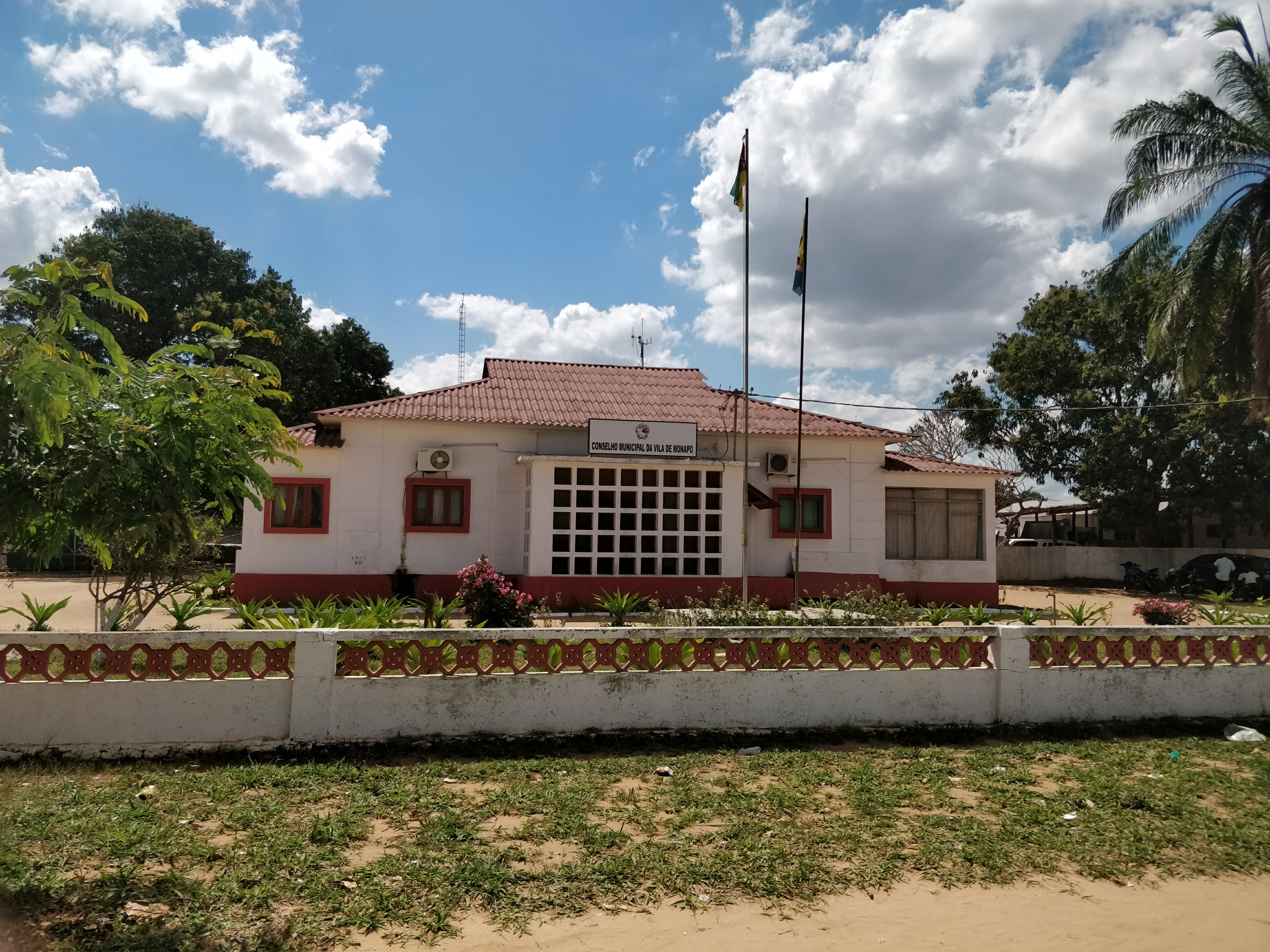
- Municipal Council of Monapo

- Location within Mozambique
- Coordinates: 14°55′01″S 40°18′08″E
- Country: Mozambique
- Province: Nampula
- Time zone: UTC+2:00 (CAT)

Monapo is a town in northern Mozambique. It is a junction station on the Nacala Railway.

== See also ==
- Railway stations in Mozambique
