= Luchenza =

- Location in Malawi
- Coordinates: 16°01′S 35°18′E
- Country: Malawi
- Region: Southern Region
- District: Thyolo District

Population (2018 Census)
  - Total: 12,600
- Time zone: +2
- Climate: Cwa

Luchenza is a town located in the Southern Region district of Thyolo in Malawi.

The town has a railway station on the Sena railway, under concession of Central East African Railways.

== Demographics ==
Year	Population
1987	4,728
1998	8,842
2008	10,896
2018	12,600
