= Nayuchi =

- Location in Malawi
- Coordinates: 14°58′0″S 35°52′0″E
- Country: Malawi
- Region: Southern Region
- Time zone: +2
- Climate: Cwa

Nayuchi is a town located in Machinga District in Malawi. Serving as a border post for road and rail control between Malawi and Mozambique.

The Mozambican town of Entre-Lagos is conurbed with Nayuchi.

== Transport ==
The town has a railway station on the Nacala railway, under concession of Central East African Railways. The town of Nayuchi has one of the most important railway stations on the Nacala railway, linking Nkaya and Liwonde (west) to Nampula and Port of Nacala (east).

== Notable people ==
- Esther Jolobala, politician
