= Valenti (surname) =

Valenti is an Italian surname, and may refer to:

== People ==
- Carlos Valenti (1888–1912), French-born painter, worked primarily in Guatemala
- Chi Chi Valenti, American journalist, nightlife producer, and performance artist
- Dino Valenti, (1937–1994), American musician
- Ed Valenti (contemporary), marketing expert; credited with creation of the infomercial genre
- Fernando Valenti (1926–1990), American harpsichordist
- Giada Valenti, Italian musician
- Giuseppe Valenti (19th century), Italian sculptor
- Jack Valenti (1921–2007), American film industry executive; president of the MPAA 1966–2004
- Jessica Valenti (born 1978), American feminist blogger and writer
- Joey Valenti (born 1966), American professional soccer player
- John Valenti (contemporary), American singer and songwriter
- Ludovico Valenti (1695–1763) Roman Catholic Cardinal, Bishop of Rimini
- Mark Valenti (contemporary), American writer
- Marco Valenti (born 1961), Italian Roman Catholic bishop
- Matt Valenti (contemporary), American college wrestler
- Mike Valenti (born 1980), American sports talk-show radio host
- Osvaldo Valenti (1906–1945), Italian film actor
- Richard Valenti (1943–2020), American serial killer
- Rita Valenti, American nurse, activist, and politician
- Rocco Valenti (1895–date of death unknown), American New York gangster; member of the Morello crime family
- Sam Valenti IV (contemporary), American record producer
- Sergio Valenti (born 1985), Argentine professional football player
- Shane Valenti (born 1987), Australian professional football player
- Tom Valenti (born 1959), American chef and restaurateur
- Umberto Valenti (1891–1922), Sicilian-born New York City gangster

== Characters ==
- Sheriff Jim Valenti, character on the American television series Roswell
- Kyle Valenti, character on the American television series Roswell
