= Valente, Mozambique =

Town in Mozambique

Valente
- Town
- Valente's location in Mozambique
- Country: Mozambique
- Time zone: UTC+2:00 (CAT)

Valente is a town in Mozambique lying on the Zambezi River.

== Transport ==
It is a branch terminus of a railway line on the Mozambique Railway system.
