= Fernao Veloso Bay =

Bight in Mozambique

- Baía de Fernão Veloso (Portuguese)
- Location in Mozambique
- Coordinates: 14°24′S 40°42′E
- Ocean/sea sources: Indian Ocean
- Basin countries: Mozambique
- Max. length: 30 km (19 mi)
- Max. width: 16 km (9.9 mi)
- Settlements: Nacala

Fernao Veloso Bay (Portuguese: Baía de Fernão Veloso) is a bay in Mozambique. It is located in Nampula Province, south of Memba Bay on the northern coast of Mozambique.

Currently the bay is a popular tourist area, having some fine beaches and diving spots.

== Geography ==
Fernao Veloso Bay is open towards the east and has deep inlets in the northwestern and southwestern corners of the inner bay. The latter runs from north to south and forms the harbour of Nacala, the deepest natural port on the east coast of Africa.

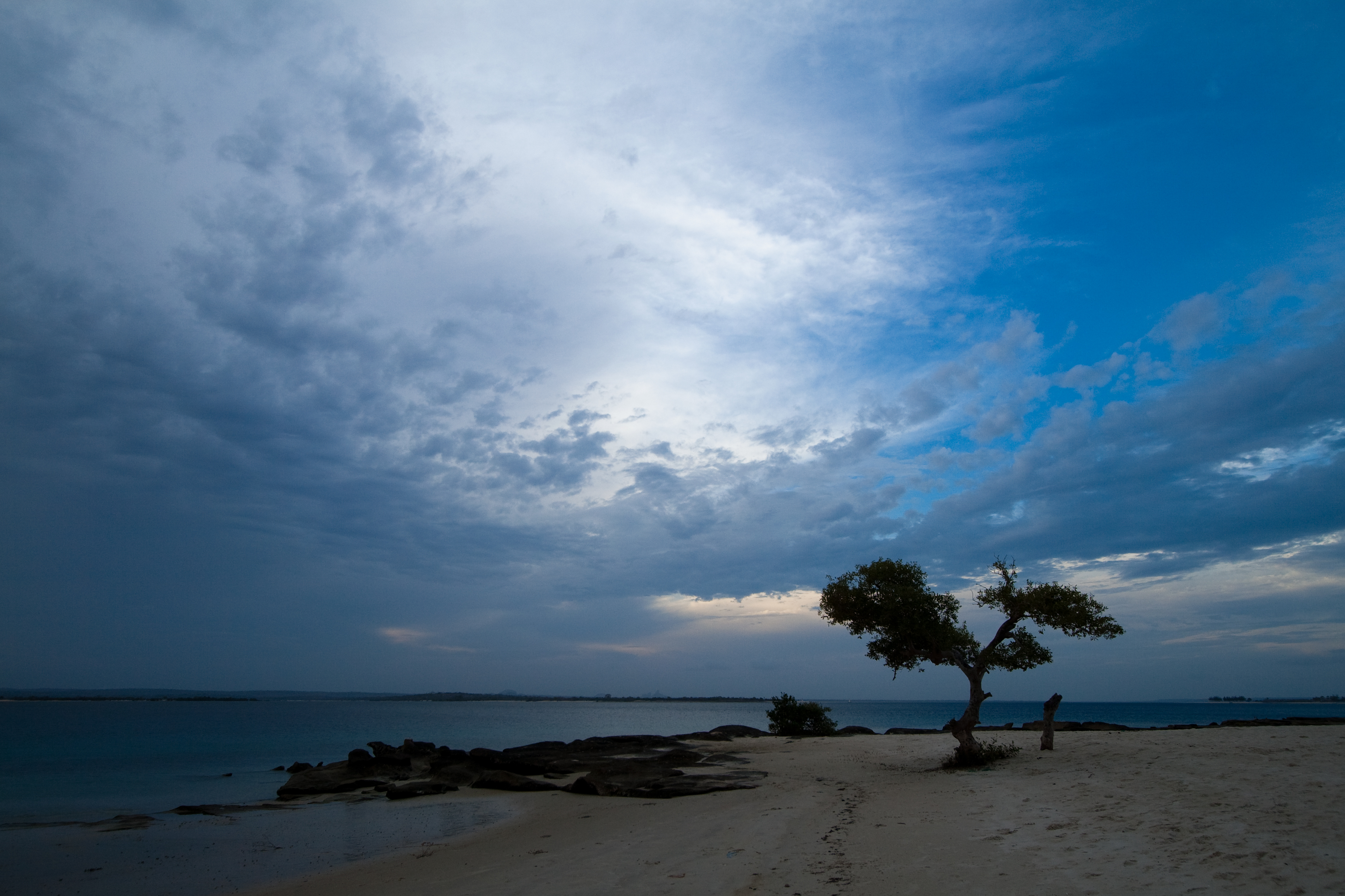
A beach in the inner bay near Nacala town

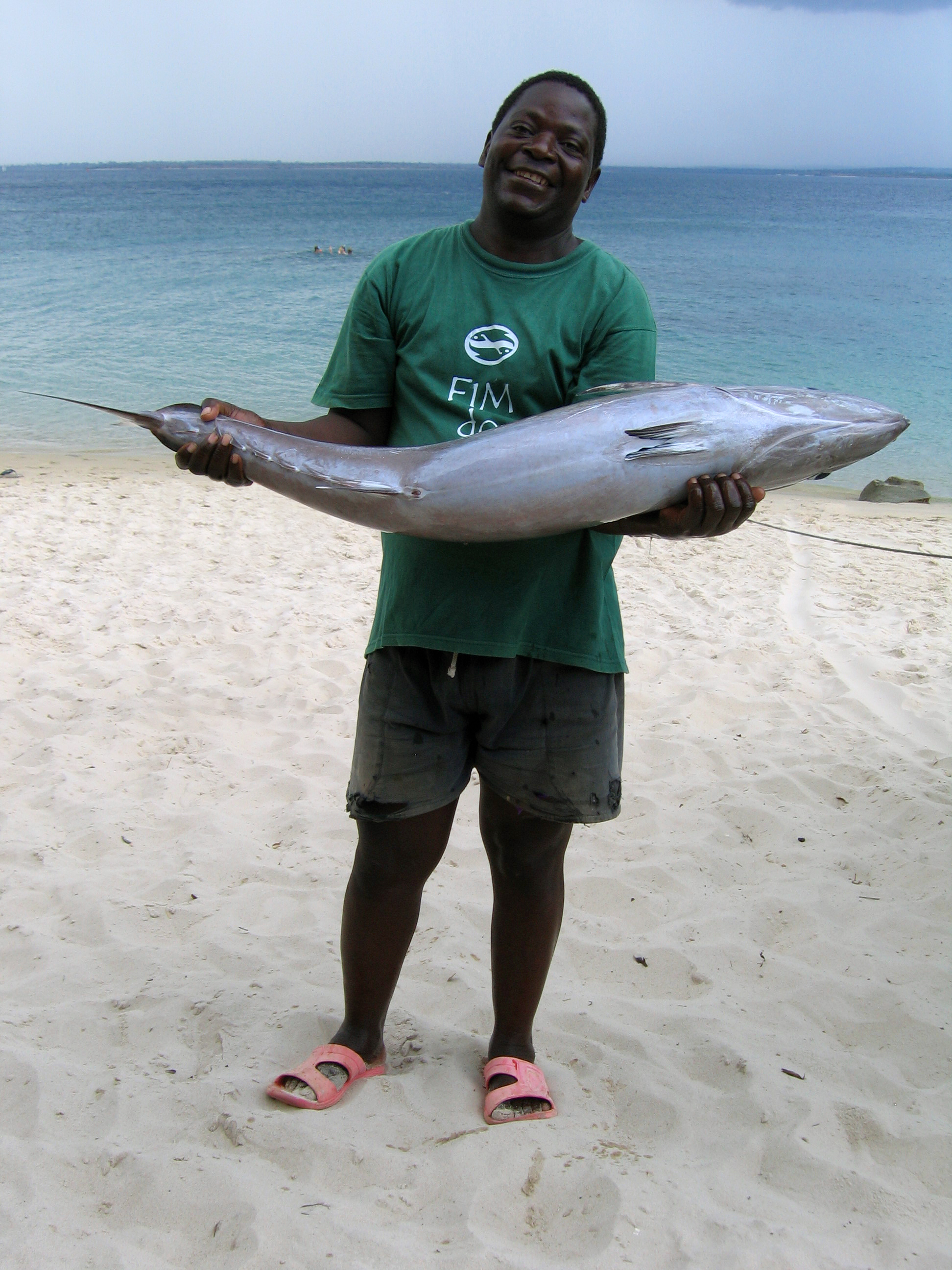
Man holding a tuna by the shore of the bay

== See also ==
- Geography of Mozambique
