= Cuamba =

Cuamba (Nova Freixo)
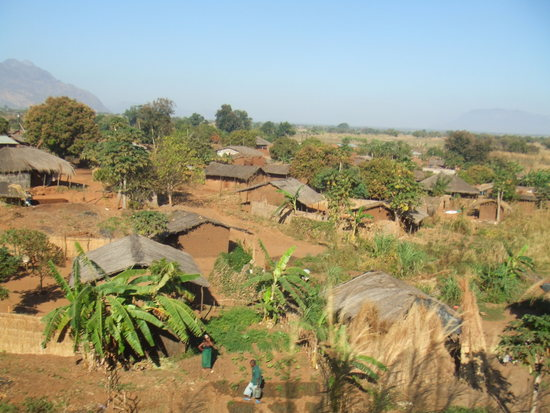
- Cuamba

- Location within Mozambique
- Coordinates: 14°49′S 36°33′E
- Country: Mozambique
- Provinces: Niassa Province
- District: Cuamba District

Population (2007 census)
  - Total: 79,013

Cuamba is a city and district of Niassa Province in Mozambique, lying north west of Mount Namuli. Before independence the town was known as Nova Freixo (New Ash).

It lies on the EN8 road, which connects it to the city of Nampula in the east and to the Malawian border in the west.

== History ==
Cuamba was created by the Niassa Company, a royal charter company in what was then known as Portuguese East Africa. The land concession of the Niassa Company extended from 1891 and 1929, and it established a military outpost initially called Kuamba in this period. The name referred to a small kingdom in the area, and Cuamba became the official name of the settlement in 1937. Its name was changed to Nova Freixo in 1952, a reference to the city of Freixo de Espada à Cinta, Portugal, the birthplace of Sarmento Rodrigues (1899-1979), the colonial governor-general of Mozambique. The town reverted to its original name of Cuamba in 1976, and was elevated to city status in 1971.

== Transport ==
It lies on the junction of the Nacala railway line, connecting Malawi to the seaport of Nacala, and the branch line to Lichinga.

There is an airport in the city called Cuamba Airport.

== Education ==
The town is home to the School of Agriculture of the Catholic University of Mozambique.

== Demographics ==
Year	Population
1997	59,396
2008	95,084

== See also ==
- Railway stations in Mozambique
