= Tete Province =

Province of Mozambique

Coordinates: 15°30′S 32°30′E

Tete
- Province
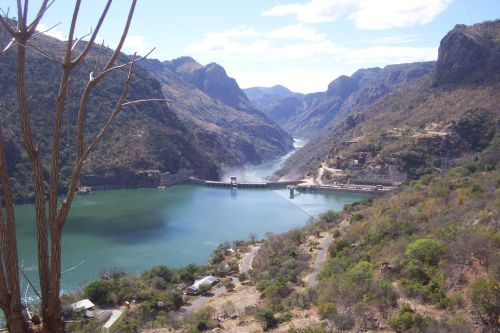

- Tete, Province of Mozambique
- Country: Mozambique
- Capital: Tete

Government
  - Governor: Domingos Juliasse Viola FRELIMO
  - Secretary of State: Cristina de Jesus Xavier Mafumo

Area
  - Total: 98,417 km^{2} (37,999 sq mi)

Population (2017 census)
  - Total: 2,648,941
  - Density: 26.915/km^{2} (69.711/sq mi)
- Postal code: 23xx
- Area code: (+258) 252
- HDI (2019): 0.407 low · 10th of 11
- Website: www.tete.gov.mz

Tete is a province of Mozambique, located in the northwest of the country. It has an area of 98,417 km^{2} and a population of 2,648,941 (2017 census).

Tete is the capital of the province. The Cahora Bassa Dam is situated in this province.

== Districts ==
On March 21, 2013, Mozambique's Assembly of the Republic authorized the creation of 13 new districts throughout the nation. Two were added to Tete. Tete Province's districts include:

- Angónia District
- Cahora-Bassa District
- Changara District
- Chifunde District
- Chiuta District
- Tete, the capital city of the province
- Doa District
- Macanga District
- Magoé District
- Marávia District
- Marara District
- Moatize District
- Mutarara District
- Tsangano District
- Zumbo District

== Demographics ==
Historical population
Year	Pop.	±% p.a.
1980	831,000	—
1997	1,226,008	+2.31%
2007	1,807,485	+3.96%
2017	2,648,941	+3.90%

== Tete Fossil Forest ==
A fossil site of global significance covers almost 1500 square km of the region. Well-preserved fossil wood from the Late Permian provides an insight into the flora of the area just prior to the end-Permian mass extinction. Many species are recorded, notably of conifers, all within the Matinde Formation which comprises sandstones, siltstones and coal beds. Marking its importance, the International Union of Geological Sciences has included the site within its 'First 100 IUGS Geological Heritage Sites' list, published in October 2022. The forest is located in the district of Magoé, between Cahora Bassa and Magoé and approximately 250 km west of the city of Tete.

== Coal resources ==
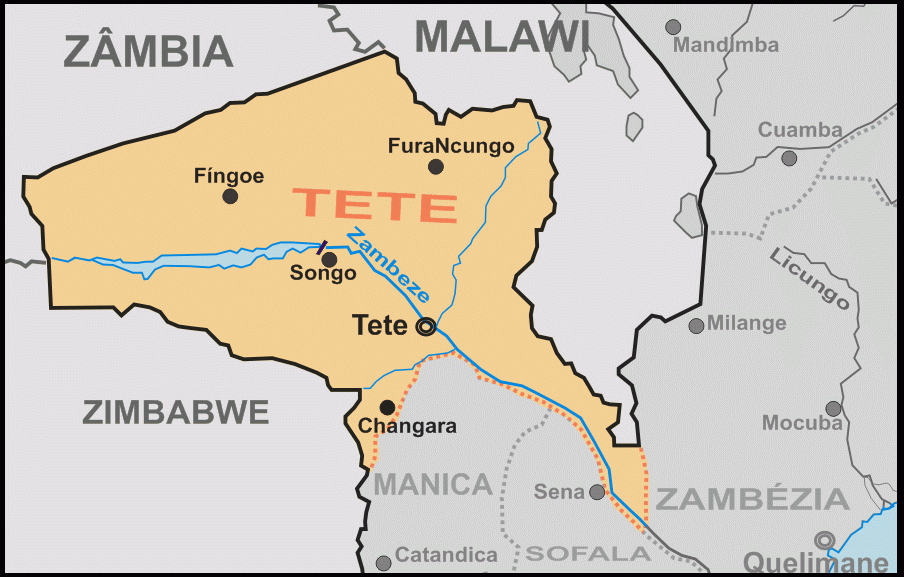
Provincial map

=== History of coal discovery ===
In 1859 Richard Thornton completed the first studies of coal occurrence in the Tete Province as part of an exhibition under Dr. David Livingstone. In his report from the trip, Mr. Thornton stated that the coal, which was dug by natives from an outcropping seam on the bank of the River Muntizi, showed no tendency to cake; was free-burning; contained very little sulphur or iron although a large proportion of ash along with a small amount of gaseous matter

=== Coal reserves ===
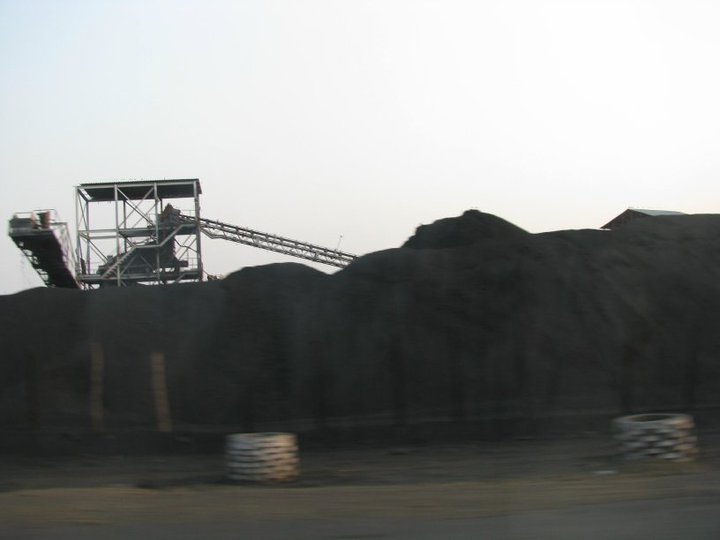
Moatize Coal Mine, Tete Province, Mozambique

The Tete Province is reported to host coal reserves of approximately 6.7 billion tons, of which 3 billion tons represent sub-economic or economic grades. The province was then regarded geologically as the largest undiscovered coal province in the world and it is estimated that the Province could be producing 25% of the world's coking coal by 2025.

==== Moatize coal deposit ====
The largest coal reserve presently discovered in the Tete Province is the Moatize metallurgical and thermal coal deposit which contains 2.4 billion tons of coal and is located with the Moatize sub-basin. Vale SA bid US$122.8 million for exploration and development rights of the project in 2008. Today, the project is a working mine which has now doubled its original output and is producing 22 million metric tons of coal per year

=== Local coal geology ===
Most coal resources are located within the remnants of the Ecca Rock Group, member of the Karoo Supergroup, and are hosted within the Zambezi graben. The coal seams were formed during the early and late Permian and deposits are associated with non-marine terrestrial clastic sedimentary sequences of the Karoo Supergroup. Depositional environments were primarily fluvial and deltaic but also included some minor lacustrine and shoreline settings.

=== Coal licenses ===
In Mozambique, 95% of coal licenses issued have been granted to forty different companies operating within the Tete Province. On 29 September 2011 the Mozambican government suspended the issuing of new coal licenses in the Tete Province in order to assess to what extent companies currently hold licenses in the Province and whether they are complying with contracts signed by the government.

=== Investment in coal development ===
A large amount of investment has been made portending to the development of coal resources and infrastructure required for mining and development. The International Finance Corporation, member of the World Bank Group has announced that it will invest up to US$5 million in Baobab Resources Plc's exploration projects with the intention of fostering economic development.

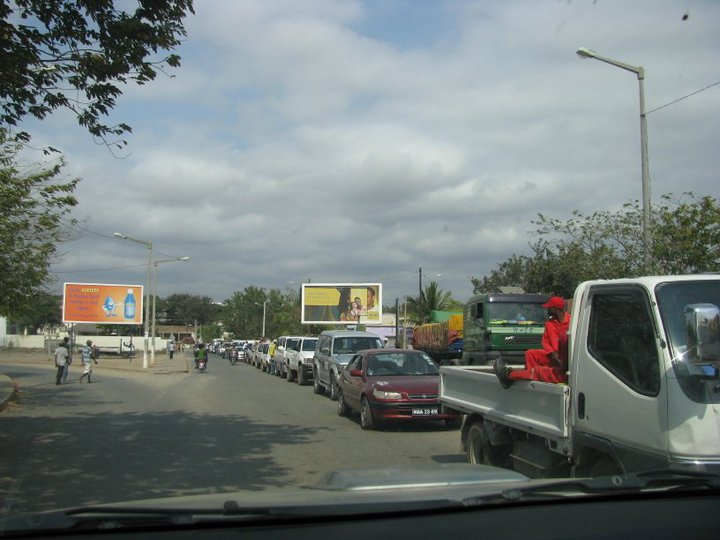
Queue to cross the Tete Suspension Bridge, Mozambique

In 2011 Vale approved a US$6 billion expansion of its Moatize coal project in order to increase output from 11 million tons per year mined initially to 22 million tons per year.

The Mozambican government have undertaken a US$375 million refurbishment of the 600 km rail link between Moatize and Beira which was severely damaged during the Mozambican Civil War. Furthermore, a deep-water international port facility is being constructed in Beira. In addition to this port at Beira, a coal terminal at Chinde, north of Beira is being planned by coal producers that will have a 20 million tonne terminal and whose opening will coincide with the beginning of production at the Zambeze Project, owned by Rio Tinto, in 2015. The link between Beira Port and the Tete Province is being referred to as the 'Beira Corridor', along which there are now plans to upgrade all major rail freight routes so that they have the capacity to transport coal resources.

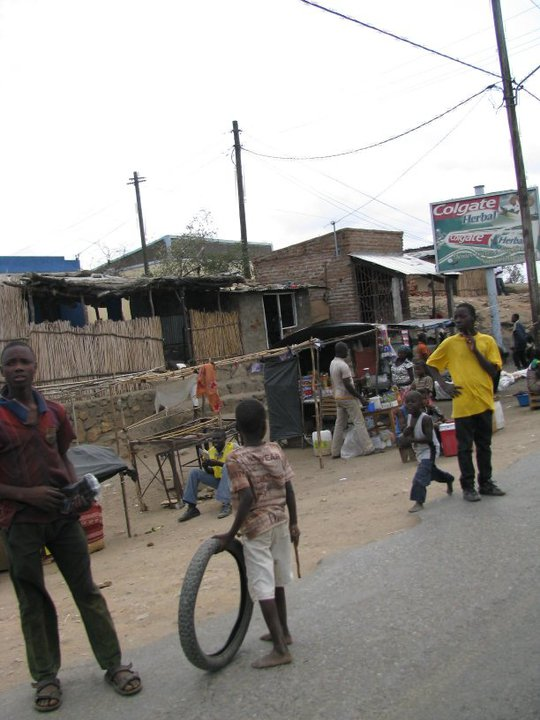
Tete, Mozambique

=== Community impacts ===
Local communities have been relocated from their land in order for the development of coal resources to commence. Vale relocated 5,000 people into new 'settlements' in order to develop its projects. The 'settlements' offered new housing and infrastructure however, people must pay for any energy which they consume.

Rio Tinto have established the 'Riversdale Training Centre', Tete, where currently 28,300 candidates are registered and 1,172 people have been trained in various civil trades and building. At the Moatize Coal Mine, 90% of Vale's employees and contractors are Mozambicans.

== See also ==
- Postage stamps and postal history of Tete
