= Nacala railway =

Railway line in Mozambique and Malawi

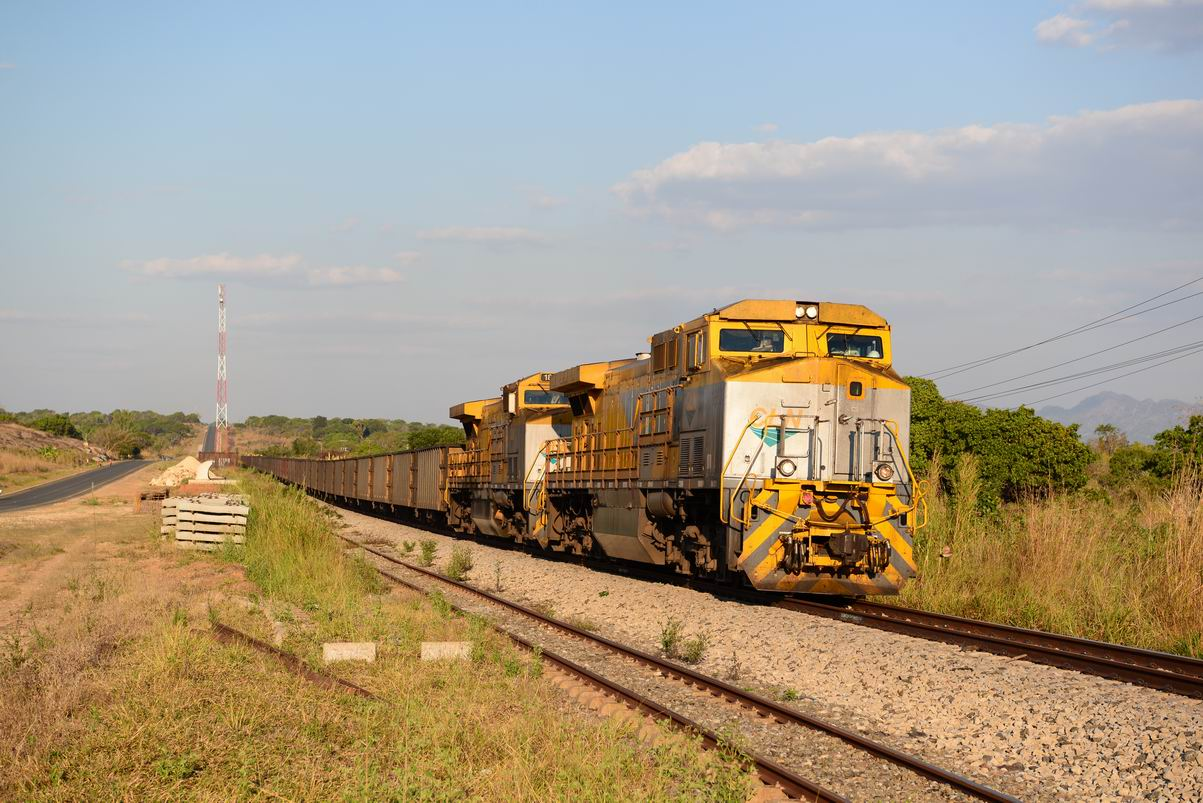

Overview
- Status: Operational
- Termini: Port of Nacala, Nacala, Mozambique; Moatize, Mozambique

Service
- Type: Cape gauge
- Operator(s): SDCN

History
- Opened: 1924

Technical
- Line length: 912 km (567 mi)
- Track gauge: 1,067 mm (3 ft 6 in)

Nacala railway, also known as Northern Corridor railway and Nacala Corridor railway, is a railway line that operates in northern Mozambique on a 912 kilometres (567 mi) line that runs west from the port city of Nacala, crossing the central region of Malawi, connecting with the coal belt of Moatize, in northwest Mozambique. It has a short branch line from the coal terminal at Nacala-a-Velha, and at Nkaya junction it connects to the Sena railway (Chipata-Lilongwe-Blantyre-Nhamayabue-Dondo), and in Moatize it connects to the Dona Ana-Moatize branch of the Sena railway. It also has a 262 kilometres (163 mi) branch line from Cuamba to Lichinga.

This railway line is part of the logistics mega-enterprise called "Nacala Logistics Corridor".

== History ==
The construction of the Nacala Railway started in 1915, as a project to link the port of Lumbo with the Mozambican hinterland and Protectorate of Nyasaland. The first 90 km to Monapo was opened for operation in 1924, but the project declined for lack of resources.

When a building was renovated in the late 1920s, he realized that the port of Lumbo had a number of design weaknesses, deciding that Nacala should be the port terminal on a line. The tracking was changed and a link between Monapo and Nacala was opened.

In 1932, a railroad reached 350 km, already connecting Nacala to Mutivasse and, in 1950, it extended to Cuamba, 538 km from Nacala. Starting from Cuamba, 262 km of lightning were built up to Lichinga.

On May 17, 1968, the government of Malawi signed an agreement with Portugal to open an extension starting in the city of Nkaya, to connect with Cuamba. The Nkaya station thus formed an interconnection between the Sena Railway and the Nacala Railway. The Nacala line is the longest but most direct route, the Malawi connection to the sea, the way the Sena line to the port of Beira has been predetermined, and most of the freight traffic caused has moved to the Nacala. The Nkaya-Cuamba extension was inaugurated by Malawian President Hastings Kamuzu Banda on July 4, 1970, in a joint ceremony with Portuguese authorities in Cuamba, and its operations started on August 3, 1970.

The Mozambican government started the recovery of the line in November 2005, within the mega-enterprise "Nacala Logistics Corridor", which guarantees a hyperconnectivity of highways, railways, ports and airports.

In 2010, a multinational mining company Vale managed to sew the formation of the joint venture "Integrated Northern Logistical Corridor Society", for the administration of the railway, having the freedom to build the extension of the Nacala Railway to the coal belt of Benga-Moatize, where the mining company has mineral exploration concessions. The extension departed from the Nkaya interconnection station and continued to Moatize, being completed in 2017. The project includes an export terminal and a coal storage yard at the port of Nacala-a-Velha.

== Main railway stations ==
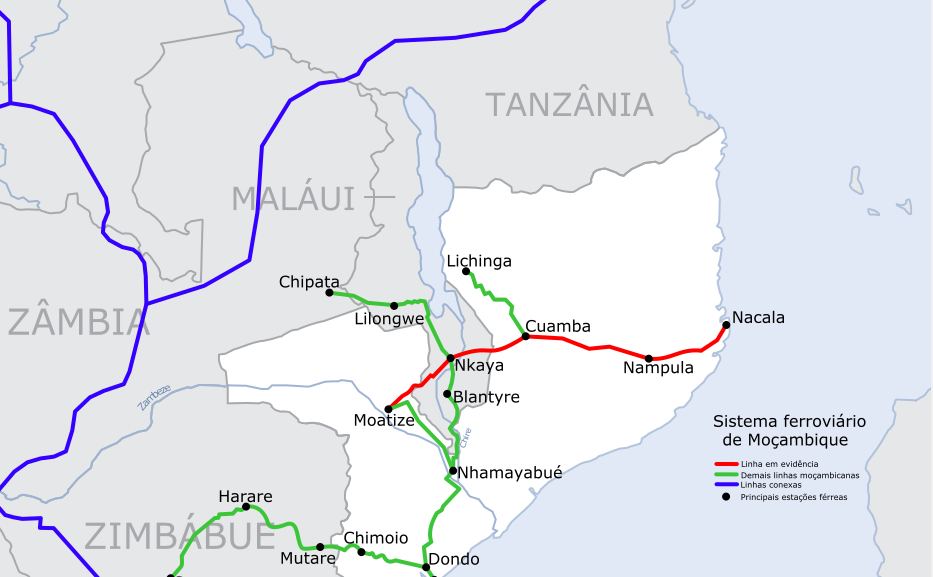
Nacala railway map (red line); railways with junction (in green); other railway routes (in blue).

The main railway stations of the Nacala railway are:

- Nacala
- Monapo (junction railway station)
- Nampula
- Cuamba (junction railway station)
- Entre-Lagos
- Nayuchi
- Liwonde
- Nkaya (junction railway station)
- Mwanza
- Cana-Cana
- Moatize (junction railway station)

== Railway branches ==
The Nacala railway has three branches of whch the first ist the most important in terms of freight:

- Nacala-a-Velha branch: connects the coal terminal at Nacala-a-Velha to the main line near the village of Andre Mossuril.
- Lumbo Branch: Connects the city of Monapo to the port village of Lumbo.
- Cuamba–Lichinga branch: connects the town of Cuamba to the city of Lichinga.
