= Nkaya =

Town in Malawi

Coordinates: 15.1333°S 35.0333°E

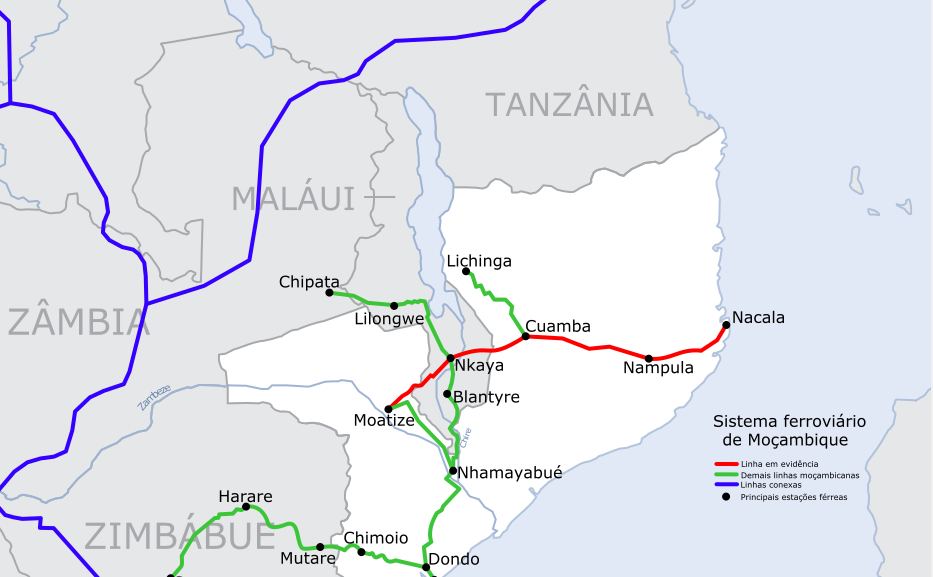
Nkaya

Nkaya, also known as Nacaia, is a town in Malawi, located in the district of Balaka and in the Southern Region of the country.

In 2022 the local Rivi Rivi River which feeds the Shire River diverted by about 500 metres as the result of rainfall and Tropical Storm Ana. A village called Chipanga and a railway line was under threat. The river was preventing people from using the existing road. The local MP Ireen Mambala organised a negotiation with four local families in Nkaya for a new route to be established across their crops. Mambala made them a present of two bags of maize and some money and thanked them publicly for their munificence.

Its economy is predominantly agricultural, but it has an important logistics sector, as it serves as the junction point of the country's road-rail systems.

== Transport ==
The city's railway station serves as the junction of the national railway network, between the Sena railway and the Nacala railway.

== See also ==
- Railway stations in Malawi
