= Nacala =

Nacala Cidade de Nacala
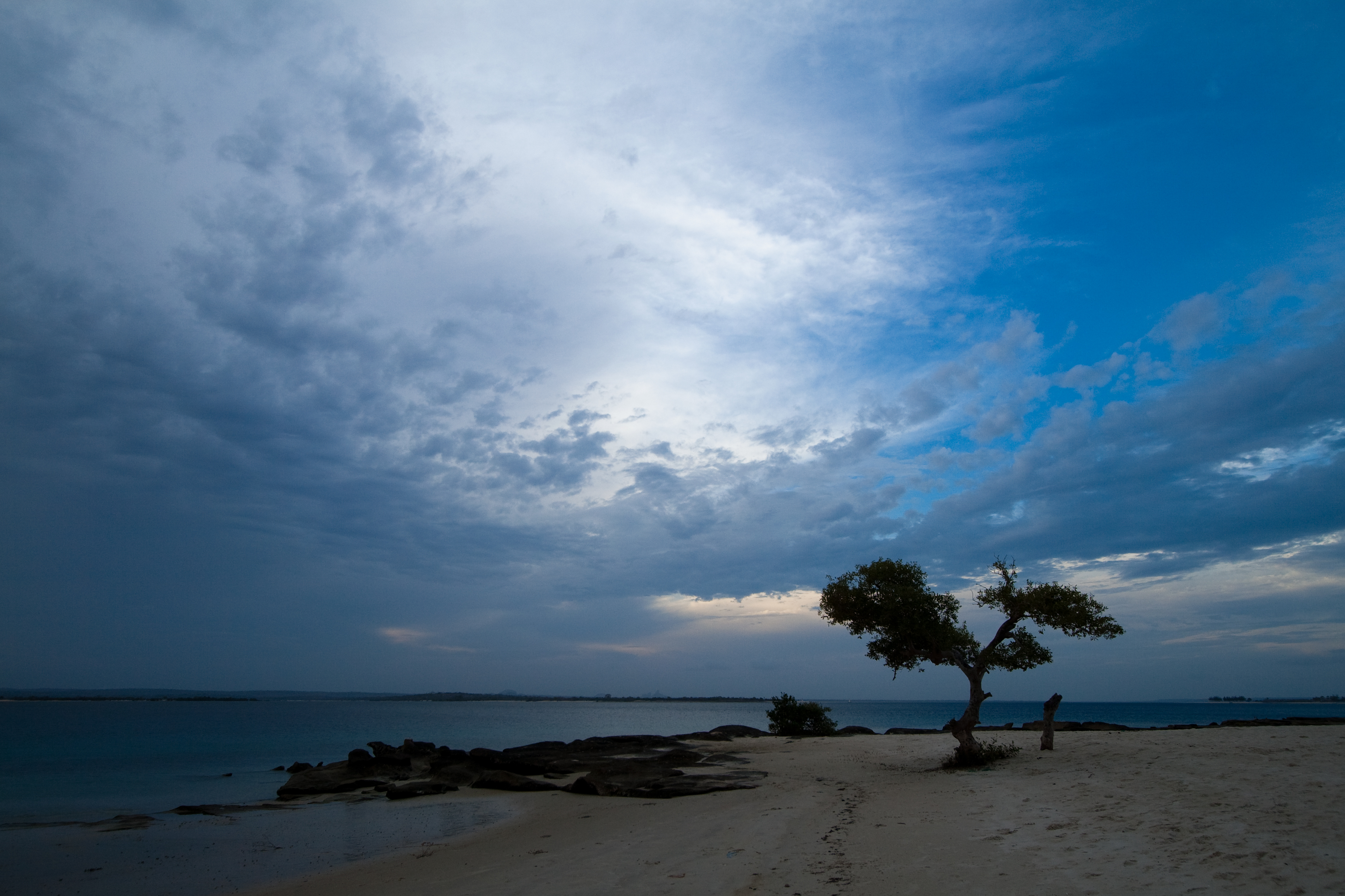
- The beach at Nacala
- Nickname: Nacala-Porto
- Location within Mozambique
- Coordinates: 14°27′S 40°40′E
- Country: Mozambique
- Provinces: Nampula Province
- District: Nacala-porto

Government
  - Type: Democratico
  - Presidente do Municipio: Raul Novinte

Population (2017 census)
  - Total: 225,034
- Climate: Aw
- Website: https://www.facebook.com/CMCNacalaPorto

Nacala (also known as Cidade de Nacala or Nacala-Porto) is a city on the northern coast of Mozambique. Located in the southwestern indentation of inner Fernao Veloso Bay, it is the deepest natural port on the east coast of Africa. Nacala serves as the terminal for the Nacala railway, a rail line to the landlocked Malawi. South of Nacala is Mozambique Island, at one time the capital of Mozambique and now a World Heritage Site.

== History ==
Nacala was founded as a little town and developed as a deep waters port and an industrial, agricultural and exporting centre during the last period of the Portuguese rule of the territory which ended in the mid-1970s. Among its major industries were cement, sisal and cashew. Other important employers were the seaport, its small modern hospital, and services (banking, insurance and administration).

== Industry ==
Nacala is site of one of three cement works in Mozambique.

== Transport ==
Nacala is the terminal of the Nacala railway that connects to the Central East African Railway (CEAR) of Malawi. The railway system was managed by the Railroad Development Corporation until September 2008 when it was sold to a group of Mozambican investors.

It is the location of the deep water port of Port of Nacala. A coal terminal, operated by the Port of Nacala, is located in the town of Nacala-a-Velha on the opposite side of the bay from Nacala.

Nacala Airport is a former airbase that has been converted into an international airport.

== Demographics ==
Year (census)	Population
1997	158,248
2007	206,449
2017	225,034

== Climate ==
Climate data for Nacala
Month	Jan	Feb	Mar	Apr	May	Jun	Jul	Aug	Sep	Oct	Nov	Dec	Year
Mean daily maximum °C (°F)	32 (89)	32 (89)	32 (89)	32 (89)	31 (88)	30 (86)	29 (85)	30 (86)	31 (87)	32 (89)	32 (89)	32 (89)	31 (88)
Mean daily minimum °C (°F)	19 (67)	19 (67)	19 (67)	18 (65)	17 (63)	16 (61)	16 (60)	15 (59)	16 (61)	18 (64)	18 (65)	19 (66)	18 (64)
Average precipitation mm (inches)	190 (7.6)	190 (7.6)	170 (6.7)	56 (2.2)	13 (0.5)	10 (0.4)	2.5 (0.1)	7.6 (0.3)	5.1 (0.2)	5.1 (0.2)	33 (1.3)	120 (4.8)	810 (31.8)
Source: Weatherbase

== Miscellaneous ==
The town is also known for its beaches and scuba diving.

== Namesake ==
There is another town in Mozambique that contains the name Nacala, it is called Nacala-a-Velha ("The Old Nacala"), just across the bay (c. 30 kilometres (19 mi) by road).

== See also ==
- Fernao Veloso Bay
- Transport in Mozambique
- Railway stations in Mozambique
- Nacala Logistics Corridor
