= Moatize =

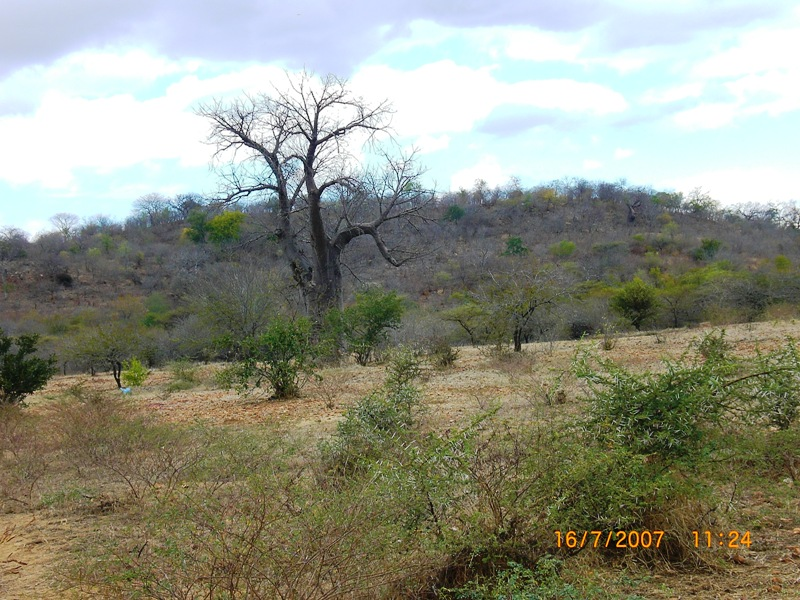
- Landscape in Moatize

- Location within Mozambique
- Coordinates: 16°07′S 33°44′E
- Country: Mozambique
- Provinces: Tete Province

Population (2007)
  - Total: 39,073
- Climate: BSh

Moatize is the principal town and administrative center of Moatize District in western Mozambique's Tete Province. It is located on the eastern side of the Zambezi River at the confluence of the Moatize and Revuboe Rivers. After Tete, it is the second largest urban area, by population, in western Mozambique.

== Economy ==
The economy of Moatize is based in the extraction of natural resources, specifically coking coal. The surrounding coal basin has an estimated 2.5 billion tons of coal. In 2006, VALE, a Brazilian company gained a concession to build and operate a coal mine at Moatize to export coal via rail to Beira, a Mozambican port. As of 2012, eight mining companies operated within the greater Moatize area, including Riversdale Mining, an Australian company.

Additionally, there are several small-scale businesses located in and around Moatize that cater to international businessmen engaged in the coal mining industry, including several small hotels, restaurants, and night clubs.

== Transport ==
Mozambique's N7 Highway, the principle paved route heading east to Malawi, passes through town. Moatize is also the terminal stop on the rehabilitated Sena railway (Dona Ana-Moatize branch line) that links western Mozambique to the port city of Beira. To fully operationalize the line, approximately 670 km of railway was upgraded at a cost of $375m. The first train in more than two decades reached Moatize on January 30, 2010. A second line, the Nacala railway, connecting the Moatize basin with a new coal harbour at Nacala-a-Velha started operating in 2015. Construction of a third rail line connecting the Moatize basin with the Indian Ocean coast at Macuse, Zambezia, is now scheduled to start in 2017, after struggling with financing difficulties.

== Demographics ==
Year	Population
2007	39,073

== See also ==
- Railway stations in Mozambique
- Transport in Mozambique
