= List of cities in Malawi =

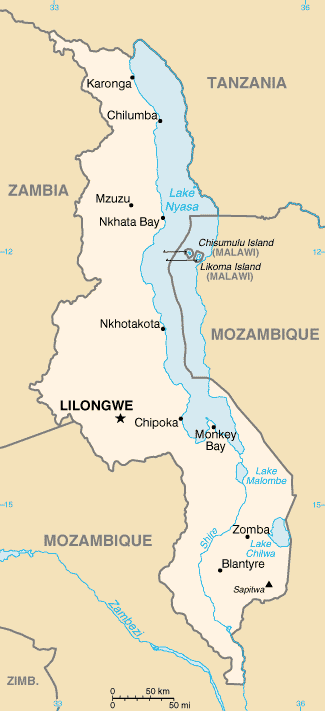
Map of Malawi

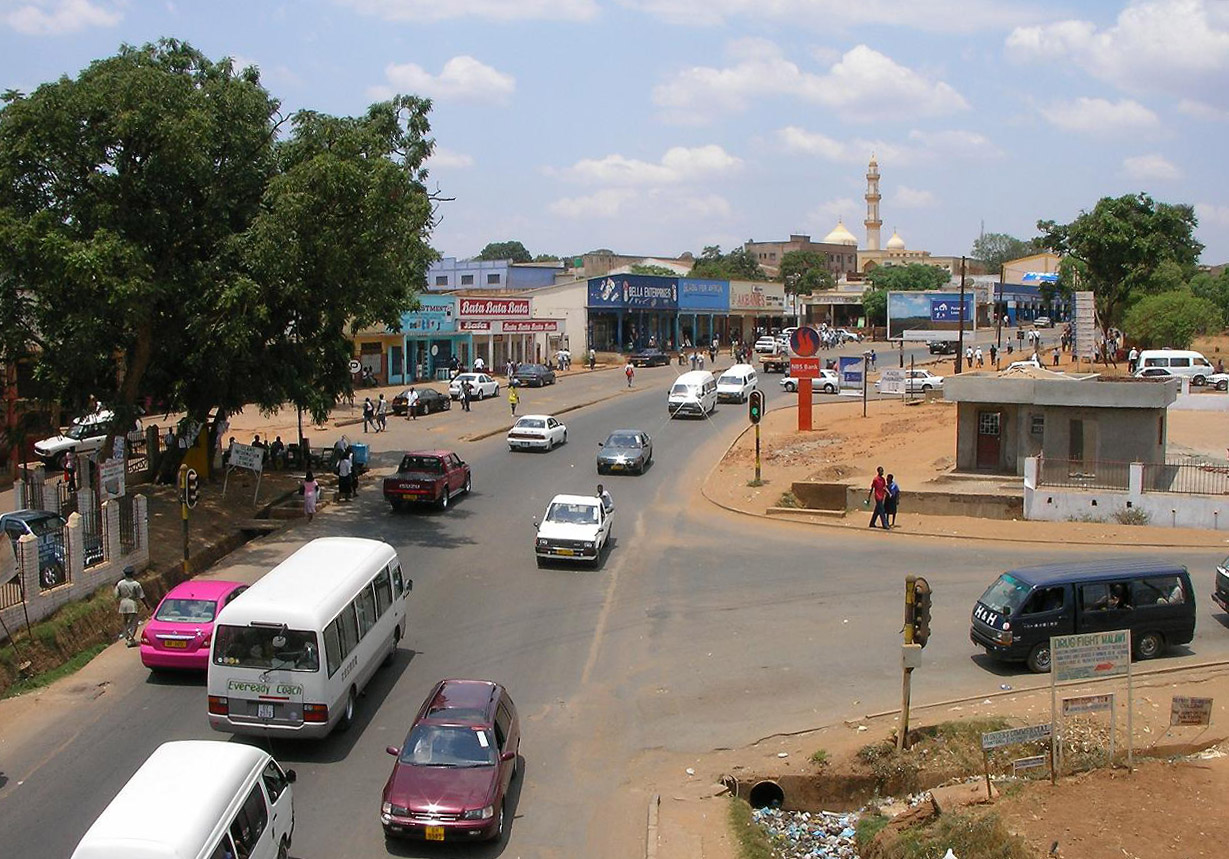
Lilongwe, Capital of Malawi

This is a list of towns and cities in Malawi:

== Northern Region ==
- Chitipa
- Chilumba
- Ekwendeni
- Karonga (61,609)
- Likoma
- Livingstonia
- Mzimba (936,250)
- Mzuzu (221,272)
- Nkhata Bay
- Rumphi (22,358)
- Chintheche
- Embangweni

== Central Region ==
- Aaron
- Chipoka
- Dedza (30,928)
- Dowa
- Kasungu
- Lilongwe (989,318)
- Mchinji (20,011)
- Mponela
- Mua
- Namitete
- Madisi
- Nkhotakota
- Nkhoma
- Ntcheu
- Ntchisi
- Salima

== Southern Region ==
- Balaka
- Bangula
- Blantyre (800,264)
- Chikwawa
- Chiradzulu
- Chiwembe
- Domasi
- Limbe
- Liwonde (36,421)
- Luchenza
- Machinga
- Malosa
- Mangochi (53,499)
- Marka
- Monkey Bay
- Mulanje
- Neno
- Ntaja
- Nkaya
- Nsanje (26,844)
- Phalombe
- Thyolo
- Zalewa
- Zomba (105,013)

== See also ==
- List of cities in East Africa
