= Roads in Malawi =

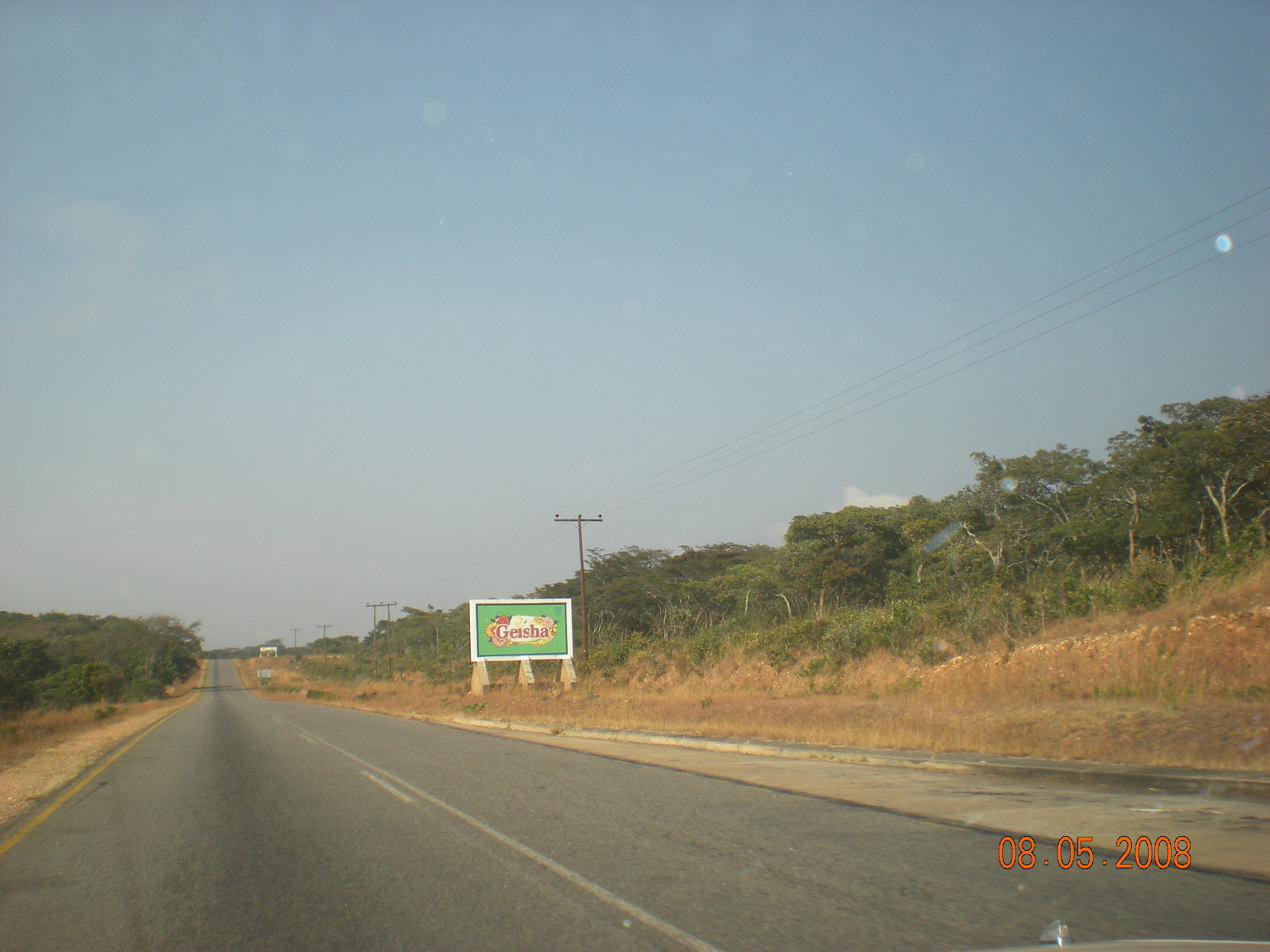
Mzuzu-Lilongwe M1 Highway from Mzimba turn-off.

Roads in Malawi are an important mode of transport in Malawi. Malawi has 15,451 kilometers of road network as of 2016 of which 28% (4,312 km) was surfaced. There were 3,357 km of principal roads within the country with majority paved having 2976 km smooth tarmac. A different scenario came in 2014 when a certain report indicated that 38% of tarred routes were top shape, 40% had deteriorated though still passable while the remaining 22% required fixing.

== Background ==
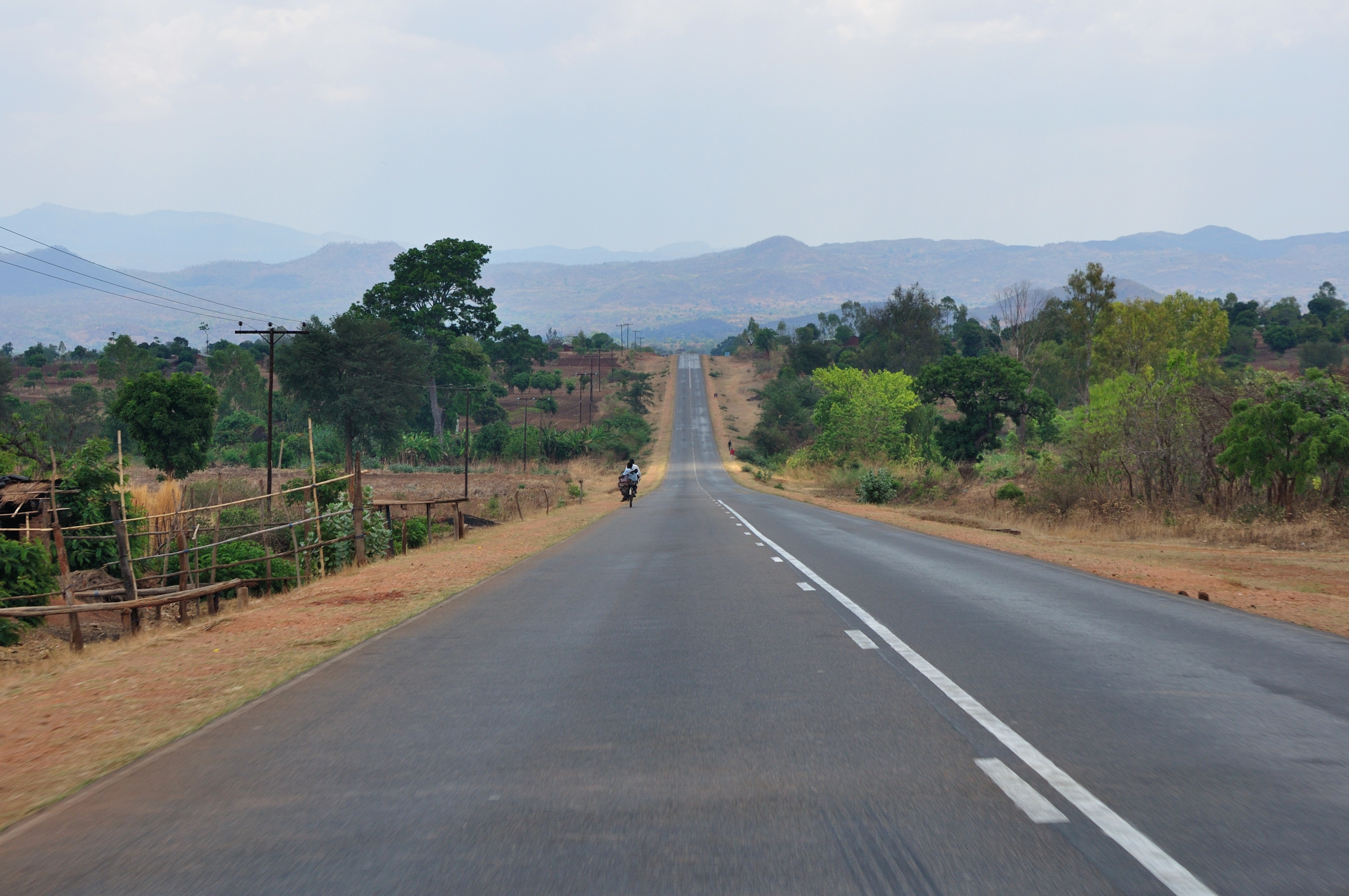
The M1 between Blantyre and Lilongwe.

Malawi has a well-developed road network especially considering its modest economic status and this could be due to the relatively high population density as compared to other African countries. It features a well-developed paved road infrastructure characterized by the main north–south artery, M1, flanked with parallel branches and few others east–west routes owing to the elongated geography of the country. However, the road conditions often leave much to be desired. In the capital city of Lilongwe, paved roads are scarce, while Blantyre, the largest town, boasts a more urban landscape with a greater number of paved roads. On September 28, 2020, Lilongwe, a clover leaf interchange was sacrificed thus not a complete lack of motorways in Malawi thereby signifying a step ahead in the country's transportation development.

Malawi's two biggest towns, Blantyre and Lilongwe, have relatively strong road systems even though they are still inadequate. Majorly, four lane highways and separate lanes are exceptionally rare, however Lilongwe is home to the only southwestern bypass. Lilongwe city center and wealthy neighbourhoods are largely paved whereas poor suburbs have mostly gravel roads. The city also features a relatively high number of roundabouts. Blantyre's road infrastructure shares similarities with Lilongwe, with the notable exception of the M2, which boasts separate carriageways, a unique feature in Malawi until recently. The city had two main urban areas due to its amalgamation with Limbe in 1956. Throughout Malawi's countryside, new road construction features resemble those found in Europe's urban areas; they include expanded lanes measuring 9–10 metres to cater for both vehicles and pedestrians as well as circular intersections which point towards upcoming improvement to our transport system.

== History ==
During the British colonial era, Malawi's road infrastructure saw limited development, with the southern region receiving the most attention. At the time of independence in 1964, the country's modern road network was sparse, with the M3 connecting Blantyre and Zomba being the sole stretch of contemporary paved road. A few other routes, such as the M2 between Blantyre and Mulanje and the M14 between Lilongwe and Salima, featured narrow paved surfaces, but these were exceptions rather than the norm, highlighting the underdeveloped state of Malawi's transportation infrastructure.

== Technical classification ==
=== National roads ===
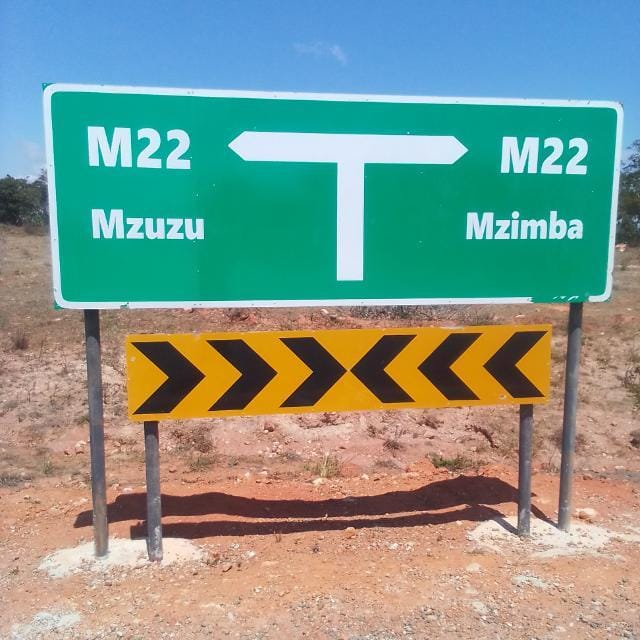
M22 road connecting Mzimba and Mzuzu.

Malawi's national road network is categorized into three distinct tiers: main roads, secondary roads, and tertiary roads, each with its own designated numbering system. The main roads serve as the backbone of the network, providing vital connections to major towns and cities across the country. While not always paved, these primary roads are crucial for facilitating transportation and commerce. The M1 stands out as the country's premier road, spanning the length of Malawi from north to south, passing through its largest urban centers and playing a vital role in linking the nation.

During President Hastings Banda's dictatorial rule from 1964 to 1994, Malawi embraced a self-sufficiency philosophy, driven by its landlocked location and lack of raw materials. To stimulate economic growth, the government invested heavily in road development, primarily to facilitate the transportation of agricultural products to urban centers. This led to a rapid expansion of Malawi's road network between the 1960s and 1980s, surpassing that of similarly prosperous nations. Key projects included the paving of the M3-M8-M1 route from Zomba to Lilongwe, followed by sections of the M1 to Mzuzu and Karonga. The 1980s saw a focus on the M5 route along Lake Malawi, which was completed as a paved road in a relatively short period. Additionally, roads in southern Malawi were upgraded, including the M1, M6, and M12, while older narrow roads like the M14 and M2 were modernized. The Road Maintenance and Construction (ROMAC) programs, launched in 1984 and 1992, further enhanced the network, including the upgrading of the M1 to a modern two-lane road and the renovation of older roads.

As Malawi transitioned to democracy in 1994, it boasted a notable 1,820 kilometers of paved roads connecting its towns, supplemented by a modest network of paved city streets. By 2011, the road conditions were relatively stable, with 60% in good shape, 33% fair, and 7% in disrepair. However, the lack of funding led to a rapid decline in road quality, with only 38% in good condition, 40% fair, and 22% in poor shape by the following years. Malawi's road development has largely relied on foreign expertise, with European and Chinese construction companies playing a significant role. Italian, British, and Portuguese firms have been particularly prominent in the country's road construction landscape. Furthermore, international donations and loans from organizations like the African Development Bank, European Union, World Bank, China, Japan International Cooperation Agency, and OPEC Fund have substantially financed Malawi's road projects.

=== Motorways ===
Despite the absence of motorways in Malawi, the country's Highway Code surprisingly includes guidelines on motorway driving, suggesting a potential future intention to develop such high-speed roads. Currently, however, Malawi's road network consists only of smaller highways, urban roads, and rural routes, with no controlled-access motorways.

=== Toll roads ===
Malawi has introduced a toll road system, managed by the Roads Fund Administration, to generate revenue for road maintenance and development. Recently, in 2021–2022, toll gates were activated on the M1 highway, a key route connecting Lilongwe and Blantyre. Additionally, foreign-registered vehicles are required to pay a Road Access Fee to use Malawi's roads, further contributing to the country's road infrastructure funding. This dual approach aims to ensure a steady revenue stream for road upkeep and improvements.

== Road numbers and names ==
Malawi's road network was previously categorized into multiple classes, including Main Roads (M), Secondary Roads (S), District Roads (D), Tertiary Roads, Quaternary Roads, and Minor Roads. In reality, most of these roads were unpaved, with the exception of the Main Roads, which were largely paved. The Main Roads were designated with numbers ranging from M1 to M26, with some numbers omitted. The Secondary Roads were assigned three-digit S-numbers, incrementing from S100 in the north to S152 in the south. Similarly, Tertiary Roads were identified with three-digit T-numbers, increasing from T300 in the north to T426 in the south, creating a systematic hierarchy of road classification.

== Speed limit ==
In Malawi, speed limits are in place to ensure road safety, with a maximum speed of 50 kilometers per hour in urban areas and 80 kilometers per hour in rural areas, providing a clear guideline for drivers to adhere to, and promoting a safe and responsible driving culture throughout the country.

== Signage ==
Malawi's road signage system remains somewhat of a mystery, but it is believed to align with the standards set by the South African Development Community (SADC), which draws inspiration from British guidelines. In a bid to harmonize road signs across the region, SADC member states, including Malawi, agreed to standardize road signage in 1995. This initiative culminated in the adoption of the SADC Road Traffic Signs Manual in 1999, providing a unified framework for road signage in the region.

== Management ==
The Malawi Roads Authority (RA) serves as the country's primary road management agency, overseeing the national road network since its establishment in 2006. The RA is responsible for maintaining and developing a vast network of 10,603 kilometers of public roads, encompassing main roads, secondary roads, and tertiary roads, as recorded in 2016. Beyond its national responsibilities, the Malawi Roads Authority also collaborates with local governments to support the development and improvement of local road infrastructure, demonstrating its commitment to comprehensive road network management.

== List ==
The following is a partial list of roads under the jurisdiction of the Road Authority of Malawi.

List of Roads In Malawi
Name of Road	Distance	Designated	Completed
Muloza–Chiringa Road	45 kilometres (28 mi)	2019	2020 (Expected)
Lirangwe–Chingale–Machinga Road	63 kilometres (39 mi)	2018	2025 (Expected)
M1 road			
M2 road			
M3 road			
M4 road			
M5 road			
M6 road			
M7 road			
M8 road			
M9 road			
M10 road			
M11 road			
M12 road			
M14 road			
M16 road			
M17 road			
M18 road			
M20 road			
M22 road			
M24 road			
M26 road			
M31 road			
M32 road			
M33 road			
M34 road			
M35 road			
M38 road			
M39 road			
M40 road			

== See also ==
- Transport in Malawi
