= M22 road (Malawi) =

Road in Malawi

M22 Road

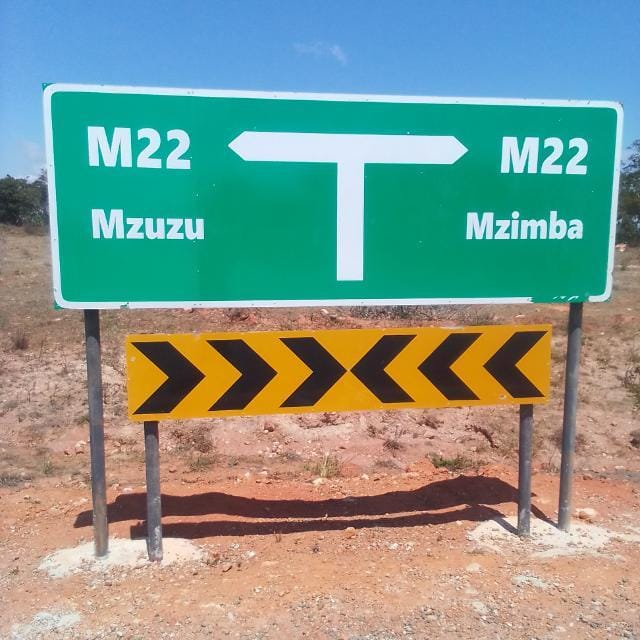

Route information
- Length: 24 km (15 mi)

Major junctions
- North end: S107
- South end: M1 / M2 in Mzimba

Location
- Country: Malawi
- Regions: Northern
- Major cities: Mzuzu, Chikangawa

Highway system
- Transport in Malawi; Roads

The M22 road is an east–west route located in the northern part of Malawi, connecting the M1 highway to the town of Mzimba. Spanning a total length of 24 kilometers, the road plays a role in linking the key locations in the region.

== Route ==
The M22 is next to Raiply and it is located in Mzimba District, Northern Region and connects with Mzuzu.

=== Direction ===
The M22 road begins at the M1 highway and extends eastwards to the town of Mzimba, where it intersects with the M9 road. The western segment of the M22 is asphalted, that provides enough space for driving surface. However, the eastern portion of the road remains unpaved due to its proximity to a nature reserve, which necessitates the use of an unpaved road to minimize environmental impact.

== See also ==
- Roads in Malawi
