= M9 road (Malawi) =

Road in Malawi

M9 Road

Major junctions
- South end: M1 / M2 in Mzimba

Location
- Country: Malawi
- Regions: Northern
- Major cities: Euthini, Mzimba

Highway system
- Transport in Malawi; Roads

The M9 road traverses the northwest region of Malawi, stretching from the vicinity of Mzimba to the Tanzanian border at Zepetia. This north-south route offers a link to the country's highlands but bypasses major urban centers. The M9 road is situated adjacent to the town of Bokosi Dindi.

== History ==
Historically, the M9 road serves as the primary route to northwestern Malawi. While the section from the M1 to Mzimba was paved before 2003, the remaining stretch is a narrow dirt road that has seen minimal improvements. The exact route of the M9 north of Mzimba is unclear, and flooding in 2016-2018 washed away a bridge over the Mzimba River, which was later rebuilt. In 2021, efforts began to replace the Mnjiri Bridge near Mzimba and to pave a 241-kilometer section of the M9 and M24 roads, spanning from Rumphi to Chitipa and passing through Nyika National Park. The project aimed to make the M9 the second north-south route to northern Malawi with long-distance paving, following the M1.

== Route ==
The M9 road diverges from the M1 highway south of Mzimba, at an elevation of approximately 1,500 meters above sea level. From there, it heads north as a paved road, passing through the town of Mzimba, the largest settlement along the route. Shortly after Mzimba, the road transitions to a dirt path, winding through a remote region at an altitude of 1,200 meters, dotted with small villages. Beyond Katumbi, the M9 ascends to a plateau at 2,000 meters, marking the highest point of any main road in Malawi, and closely follows the border with Zambia. The road reaches its highest point at approximately 2,200 meters before descending to 1,500 meters. Continuing northward as a dirt road, the M9 traverses the highlands of northwest Malawi like the Mafinga Hills, passing through larger villages with brief stretches of pavement. The road ultimately reaches the northwestern tip of Malawi after Chitipa, flanked by the borders with Zambia and Tanzania. While the primary border crossing lies earlier at Isongole, Tanzania, where the Tanzanian T27 connects, the M9 extends another 25 kilometers before terminating at the Tanzanian border.

== See also ==
- Roads in Malawi
