= M16 road (Malawi) =

Road in Malawi

M16 Road

Location
- Country: Malawi
- Regions: Central
- Major cities: Chidothi, Dowa, Mbalame

Highway system
- Transport in Malawi; Roads

The M16 road is a road in Malawi spanning a concise 8.23 kilometers to form an east–west connection in the country's central region. Situated north of the Lilongwe area, this road plays a role in facilitating travel and commerce across the heart of Malawi, providing a transportation link between neighboring towns and villages.

== Route ==
The M16 road serves as a link between the M1 and M14 roads, bridging the western and eastern regions of Malawi's central area. The route passes through Dowa, where it shares a dual designation with the M7 road to the west. Notably, the western segment of the M16, stretching from the M1 to the M7, is a dirt road, whereas the eastern section, connecting the M7 to the M14, is a paved thoroughfare, reflecting the varying infrastructure along this important transportation corridor.

== History ==
The M16 road has seen several transformations in recent years, evolving from a fully unpaved route to a partially asphalted thoroughfare. A major milestone was achieved around 2015, when the stretch between the M7 and Dowa was upgraded with a paved surface, enhancing connectivity and travel efficiency. Building on this progress, the remaining section between Dowa and the M14 was also paved between 2019 and 2020, marking a substantial improvement in the road's overall infrastructure and usability.

== See also ==
- Roads in Malawi
