= M10 road (Malawi) =

Road in Malawi

M10 Road

Location
- Country: Malawi
- Regions: Southern
- Major cities: Mangochi, Monkey Bay, Mtakataka

Highway system
- Transport in Malawi; Roads

The M10 road is a road in Malawi that stretches 19.36 kilometres along the southern shores of Lake Malawi. The key route connects the towns of Mtakataka and Mangochi, providing a link between the region's population centers and economic hubs, and facilitating the flow of trade and commerce across the scenic southern landscape.

== Route ==
The M10 embarks on its 19.36-kilometer journey south of Mtakataka, where it diverges from the M5. Initially, the road winds its way east as a dirt track, but after 15 kilometers, it transitions into a paved path, traversing the expansive, flat savannah that stretches south of Lake Malawi. As the M10 continues eastward, it draws closer to the lake's shores, eventually veering southeast towards the town of Mangochi, where it ultimately converges with the M3, marking the road's termination.

== History ==
While the M10 has historically been overshadowed by other major roads in Malawi, it has gained significance in recent years due to its role in supporting the country's tourism industry, particularly around the popular Monkey Bay area. The road is composed of three distinct sections: the primary eastern stretch between Mangochi and Monkey Bay, a middle segment, and a lesser-used western portion, which remained unpaved as of 2021. In a bid to enhance the road's infrastructure, the European Union funded a series of upgrade projects, including the modernization of the Mangochi to Monkey Bay section between 2007 and 2009, and the renovation of the Golomoti to Monkey Bay stretch in 2009, which also encompassed a portion of the S127 road. Such improvements have contributed to the M10's growing importance as a transportation artery.

== See also ==
- Roads in Malawi
