= M8 road (Malawi) =

Road in Malawi

M8 Road

Location
- Country: Malawi
- Regions: Southern
- Major cities: Balaka, Liwonde

Highway system
- Transport in Malawi; Roads

The M8 road is the road in Malawi that serves as an east–west connector in southern Malawi, bridging the gap between the major routes M1 and M3. Spanning 35 kilometers, the road links the towns of Balaka and Liwonde, facilitating efficient travel and trade between the region's important population centers and economic hubs.

== History ==
During the British colonial era, the M8 played a role as a connection, largely due to Zomba's strategic location as the traditional capital of Malawi, situated further east. The road's significance was likely recognized early on, and it may have been upgraded with pavement as far back as the 1950s, underscoring its importance in facilitating communication and commerce between key administrative centers and population hubs.

== Route ==
The M8 serves as a link between the M1 and M3, two major routes in Malawi, connecting the western and eastern regions. Balaka stands as the principal town along this route, which terminates just west of Liwonde. Notably, the entire 35-kilometer stretch is paved, ensuring a smooth journey through the countryside, characterized by rolling hills and a moderate elevation of around 600 meters, dotted with clusters of settlements and villages.

== See also ==
- Roads in Malawi
