= M11 road (Malawi) =

Road in Malawi

M11 Road

Location
- Country: Malawi
- Regions: Northern
- Major cities: Timbiri, Chiweta, Chiunjika

Highway system
- Transport in Malawi; Roads

The M11 road is a road in Malawi that stretches about 12.96 kilometers along the shores of Lake Malawi, connecting Timbiri and Chiweta. However, the road's development has stalled, leaving a substantial gap in its route. While some sections exist as dirt roads or tracks, a significant portion of the M11 remains a missing link, hindering the creation of a seamless north–south passage along the lake's scenic shoreline.

== Route ==
The M11's journey is a fragmented one, with a glaring absence in its middle section. The existing stretches are largely dirt roads, some barely passable, others merely dirt tracks. From Timbiri, the route begins as a dirt road, veering north from the M5, but its motorable stretch is short-lived, ending after just 10 kilometers. Beyond this point, only rugged dirt paths lead to secluded mountain villages. The middle section is a void, with small lakeside villages scattered but no connecting road. Further north, a dirt road emerges from Chiunjika, narrowing as it winds its way to the M1 at Chiweta, a tenuous link in the incomplete chain that is the M11.

== History ==
The M11 was likely designated with the goal of expanding the Lakeshore Road (M5) further north, yet this vision remains largely unrealized. As of 2020, the project's progress was underwhelming, with only the southern section barely passable as a dirt road, the middle stretch utterly nonexistent, and a mere fragment of the northern section existing as a dirt road, leaving the ambitious extension plan stillborn.

== See also ==
- Roads in Malawi
