= Muloza–Chiringa Road =

Malawian road

Coordinates: 15°50′13″S 35°45′26″E

Route information
- Length: 28 mi (45 km)
- History: Designated in 2019; Completion in 2021 (Expected)

Major junctions
- South end: Muloza
- North end: Chiringa

Location
- Country: Malawi

Highway system
- Transport in Malawi; Roads

The Muloza–Chiringa Road is a road in the Southern Region of Malawi, connecting the towns of Muloza in Mulanje District, and Chiringa, in Phalombe District.

== Location ==
The road starts at Muloza as the T-415 road and progresses at first, in a general north-easterly direction, hugging the Ruo River and the Malawi/Mozambique border. At the southeastern corner of the Mulanje Mountain Forest Reserve, the road abandons the course of the river and the border, turning northwards, hugging the eastern edge of the forest reserve, to end at Chiringa, a total distance of approximately 45 kilometres (28 mi).

== Overview ==
This road is important as it connects the international border town of Muloza to the interior of Malawi. Before 2019, the road had a gravel surface. In 2019, the government of Malawi, using internally generated funds, began upgrading the road to grade II bitumen surface with shoulders, culverts, and drainage channels. The work was contracted in phases. The first phase from Muloza to Muloza Bridge, measuring about 20 kilometres (12 mi), was contracted to M.A. Kharafi and Sons, at a contract price of MWK7 billion (US$10 million). The first phase which started in April 2019, is expected to last 18 months until October 2020.

== See also ==
- List of roads in Malawi
- Transport in Malawi
