= M6 road (Malawi) =

Road in Malawi

M6 Road

Location
- Country: Malawi
- Regions: Southern
- Major cities: Mwanza, Zalewa

Highway system
- Transport in Malawi; Roads

The M6 is one of the main roads in Malawi. It acts as a transportation link in Malawi, spanning 57 kilometers in east-west direction across the southern region. Beginning at the M1 junction near Zalewa, the M6 traverses the scenic landscape to reach the border with Mozambique near Mwanza, providing a connection between the two nations.

== History ==
The M6 has long served as the principal artery connecting Malawi to the Zambezi River in Mozambique, with a history dating back to British colonial times. It is likely that the road was paved even during the colonial era, emphasizing its significance. After years of use, the road underwent a major rehabilitation project around 2001, ensuring its continued importance as a vital transportation link between the two nations.

== Route ==
In Zalewa, the M6 road originates at a junction with the M1, then embarks on a southwestward journey through a gently undulating savannah landscape dotted with cultivated fields. The entirety of the M6 is paved, ensuring a smooth journey for travelers. The town of Mwanza is the main settlement along this route. Upon reaching the Mozambican border, the N7 road seamlessly continues the journey, leading onward to the city of Tete.

== See also ==
- Roads in Malawi
