= M12 road (Malawi) =

Road in Malawi

M12 Road

Route information
- Length: 119 km (74 mi)

Major junctions
- East end: M1 in Lilongwe
- M18 in Kamwendo
- West end: T4 at the Zambian border near Mchinji

Location
- Country: Malawi
- Regions: Central
- Major cities: Lilongwe, Kamwendo, Mchinji

Highway system
- Transport in Malawi; Roads

The M12 road is a road in Malawi that spans 119 kilometers that traverses the country from east to west, connecting the capital city of Lilongwe to the Zambian border at Mchinji, providing a transportation artery between the two nations and facilitating the movement of people and goods across the region.

== Route ==
The M12 road originates in Lilongwe, the capital city, at a circular junction with the M1, and extends westward as a single-lane paved thoroughfare, unlocking the city's periphery and revealing the picturesque highlands. At an elevation of approximately 1,100 meters, the road traverses a relatively flat terrain characterized by expansive open savannahs, punctuated by occasional small towns. As it approaches the triple border with Mozambique and Zambia, the M12 remains paved, ultimately terminating at the Zambian border in Mchinji. On the Zambian side, the T4 road (Great East Road) seamlessly connects to Chipata (20 kilometres away), ensuring a continuous journey across the border. The border on the Zambian side is named Mwami.

== History ==
For decades, the M12 has served as the primary artery connecting Malawi and Zambia, facilitating the flow of people, goods, and services between the two nations. Recognizing its strategic importance, the road was earmarked for development in the 1970s and underwent a significant transformation with the construction of a paved surface around 1977, cementing its status as a transportation link in the region.

== See also ==
- Roads in Malawi
