= Lirangwe–Chingale–Machinga Road =

Road in Malawi

Coordinates: 15°23′45″S 35°10′52″E

Route information
- Length: 39 mi (63 km)
- History: Designated in 2018; Completion in 2025 (Expected)

Major junctions
- South end: Lirangwe
- Chingale
- North end: Machinga

Location
- Country: Malawi

Highway system
- Transport in Malawi; Roads

The Lirangwe–Chingale–Machinga Road is a road in the Southern Region of Malawi, connecting the towns of Lirangwe in Blantyre District to the towns of Chingale in Zomba District and the town of Machinga in Machinga District.

== Location ==
The road starts at Lirangwe, Blantyre District, along the Blantyre–Lilongwe Road (M1 Highway), approximately 54 kilometres (34 mi) north of the city of Blantyre. From there, the road takes a north-easterly direction to Chingale in Zomba District, and continues northeastwards to end at Machinga in Machinga District, along the Blantyre–Zomba–Mangochi Road (M3 Highway). The road measures approximately 63 kilometres (39 mi) from end to end.

== Overview ==
Prior to 2014, the road had a gravel surface in poor condition. The Malawian president at that time, Joyce Banda, laid a foundation stone for the work to commence, after obtaining concessional loans from Arab development partners.

However, work progressed very slowly. The next president of the country, Peter Mutharika also laid a stone for the work to start, in 2018. As of February 2018, only 11 percent of the work had been completed, with a completion date of September 2019, as of then.

== Construction ==
The Engineering Procurement and Construction (EPC) contract was awarded to Mota-Engil Malawi, a subsidiary of Mota-Engil, the Portuguese engineering and construction conglomerate. Construction began in April 2018. The road has been beset by repeated delays from the onset. As of March 2020, work on upgrading the road to class II bitumen standard with shoulders, culverts, drainage channels and at least four bridges, is again stalled.

== Funding ==
The total cost of the Lirangwe–Chingale–Machinga Road Project is reported as US$139 million. The table below illustrates the various sources of funding for the project as reported in Malawian print media.

Lirangwe–Chingale–Machinga Road Funding
Rank	Funding Source	Funding in US Dollars	Percentage	Notes
1	Kuwait Fund for Arab Economic Development	10.2 million	7.4	Soft Loan
2	Saudi Fund for Development	29.5 million	20.5	Loan
3	Arab Bank for Economic Development in Africa	29.5 million	20.5	Loan
4	OPEC Fund for International Development	20.0 million	14.4	Loan
5	OPEC Fund for International Development	20.0 million	14.4	Loan
6	Government of Malawi	29.8 million	21.4	Infrastructure Investment
	Total	139.0 million	100.00	

- Note: Totals may slightly b off due to rounding.

== Benefits ==
Among the benefits exacted to be reaped out of this road, when tarmacked, include the following:

1. The three districts that the road corridor traverses are heavily agricultural. The produce harvested in the region is expected to find easy market in the cities, unlike before when transport was a challenge.

2. With the travel corridor nearly impassable during both the dry and wet seasons, many maternity cases could not access health facilities to receive antenatal care and maternity services when due.

3. The completion of the Upgrading of Lirangwe–Chingale–Machinga Road, is expected to open up this transport corridor to tourist destinations along the western shores of Lake Malawi, around the city of Mangochi.

== See also ==
- List of roads in Malawi
