= M3 road (Malawi) =

Road in Malawi

M3 Road

Route information
- Length: 276 km (171 mi)

Major junctions
- North end: N13 at the Chiponde border with Mozambique
- South end: M1 / M2 in Blantyre

Location
- Country: Malawi
- Regions: Southern
- Major cities: Blantyre, Zomba, Mangochi

Highway system
- Transport in Malawi; Roads
← M2	→ M4

The M3 road, also known partially as the Blantyre-Zomba road, is a road in Malawi.

The road runs north-south through southern Malawi, beginning in Blantyre and covering 236 kilometres to Chiponde in Mozambique.

The M3 road is included in the Malawi National Transport Master Plan.

== History ==
The M3 has historically played a role in connecting key cities in Malawi, particularly during the country's formative years. Zomba, the former capital of Nyasaland and later Malawi, held significant political importance until 1974 when the capital was relocated to Lilongwe. However, it wasn't until 1994 that the parliament officially made the move.

Meanwhile, Blantyre remained the country's commercial and industrial hub, a status it still maintains today. Notably, a road linking Blantyre and Zomba dates back to 1893, and by the time Malawi gained independence in 1964, this route was the only major paved road in the country.

A major overhaul of the Blantyre-Zomba Road took place between 2013 and 2015, by upgrading small bridges and culverts. Meanwhile, two significant bridges along the route underwent modernization: the Liwonde bridge over the Shire River, originally opened in 1965, was replaced with a brand-new structure in 2018, while the Mangochi bridge was upgraded to a sturdy concrete box bridge as far back as 1999.

== Route directions ==
The M3 road begins in the eastern part of Blantyre, branching off of the M2. It then runs north at an elevation of approximately 1,000m and reaches the town of Zomba, routing around the island mountain ranges north of Zomba rather than through a mountain pass.

The road then drops to around 500m, crossing the Shire River in Liwonde and continues northward along the western shores of Lake Malombe to the town of Mangochi, where it converges with the M10 and runs eastward, crossing the Shire River again.

It then reaches an elevation of almost 1,000m again. The M3 is paved up until the border town of Chiponde, however the final stretch to the Mozambique border is unpaved. It then continues as a paved road on the Mozambican side as the N13, leading to Cuamba.

== See also ==
- Roads in Malawi
