= M11 =

M11 or M-11 may refer to:

== Aviation ==
- Miles M.11 Whitney Straight, a 1936 two-seater light aircraft
- Shvetsov M-11, an aircraft engine produced in the Soviet Union

== Science ==
- Messier 11 (M11), an open star cluster also known as the Wild Duck Cluster
- Mathieu group M11 in the mathematical field of group theory
- Ritter M11 UltraClave, a model of autoclave made by Midmark

== Transportation ==
- M-11, a state highway in the metropolitan area of Grand Rapids, Michigan
- M11 (East London), a Metropolitan Route in East London, South Africa
- M11 (Cape Town), a Metropolitan Route in Cape Town, South Africa
- M11 (Johannesburg), a Metropolitan Route in Johannesburg, South Africa
- M11 (Pretoria), a Metropolitan Route in Pretoria, South Africa
- M11 (Durban), a Metropolitan Route in Durban, South Africa
- M11 (Bloemfontein), a Metropolitan Route in Bloemfontein, South Africa
- M11 (Port Elizabeth), a Metropolitan Route in Port Elizabeth, South Africa
- M11 motorway in England
- M11 motorway (Pakistan) Sialkot - Lahore Motorway in Pakistan
- the Moscow–Saint Petersburg motorway, designated M11
- Highway M11 (Ukraine)
- M11 motorway, portion of the N11 road in Ireland
- M11 (New South Wales), the NorthConnex motorway tunnel in Sydney, Australia
- Mornington Peninsula Freeway in Victoria, Australia designated M11
- New York City Bus M11, a New York City Bus route in Manhattan
- M11 (Istanbul Metro), a rapid transit line of the Istanbul Metro
- M11 road (Zambia), a road in Zambia
- M11 road (Malawi), a road in Malawi
- Sri Lanka Railways M11, diesel-electric locomotives

== Firearms and military equipment ==
- M11, a United States military designation for the SIG Sauer P228 semi-automatic pistol
- Ingram MAC-11, a sub-compact machine pistol
- M-11 Shtorm, a 1959 Russian naval surface-to-air missile system
- Fiat M11/39, an Italian medium tank used during World War II
- Grigorovich M-11, a 1916 Russian single-seat fighter flying boat
- Mk 11 Mod 0 Sniper Weapon System, a variant of the SR-25 used by the United States Navy
- Remington 11-87, a semi-automatic shotgun
- Panhard ULTRAV M11, a reconnaissance variant of the Véhicule Blindé Léger marketed to the US Army

== Other ==
- M11, an abbreviation used to refer to the 11 March 2004 Madrid train bombings
- Change 2011, a Finnish political party which advocates direct democracy
- M-11 (comics), a fictional robot in Atlas Comics and Marvel Comics
- Magic 2011, the twelfth core set in Magic: The Gathering
- M11, a difficulty grade in mixed climbing
- M11, a postcode district for an area of east Manchester, see M postcode area
