= M1 road (Malawi) =

Road in Malawi

M1 Road

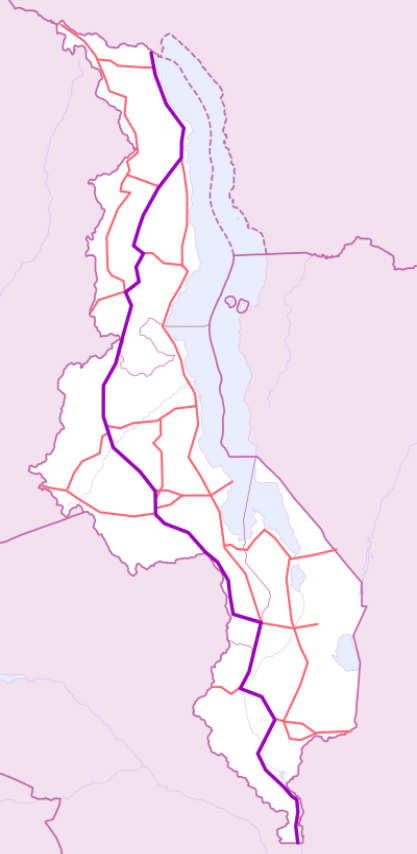

Route information
- Length: 1,137 km (706 mi)

Major junctions
- South end: N300 at the Marka border with Mozambique
- M3 / M2 in Blantyre; M6 near Zalewa; M8 near Balaka; M5 near Balaka; M12 in Lilongwe; M14 near Lilongwe; M7 near Othambwe; M18 in Kasungu; M20 near Mzimba; M9 near Mzimba; M22 near Mzimba; M5 in Mzuzu; M24 near Rumphi; M26 in Karonga
- North end: T32 at the Songwe border with Tanzania

Location
- Country: Malawi
- Regions: Northern, Central, and Southern Region
- Major cities: Blantyre, Mzuzu, Lilongwe

Highway system
- Transport in Malawi; Roads
| → M2 |

The M1 road is a road in Malawi. The road serves as the backbone of Malawi's transportation network, stretching from the country's northern border with Tanzania at Kasumulu all the way down to the southern border with Mozambique at Marka. The north-south artery passes through the capital city of Lilongwe and the commercial hub of Blantyre, covering a total distance of 1,140 kilometers. As the longest road in Malawi, the M1 plays a role in connecting the country's major urban centers and facilitating trade and travel.

== History ==
During the British colonial era, the M1 road served as the primary thoroughfare of Nyasaland, linking the colony's two major urban centers, Lilongwe and Blantyre. The road also connected to Tanzania, another British colony, forming a vital regional artery. While the connection to Mozambique was less significant at the time, historical maps from the 1950s reveal that the route briefly strayed into Mozambican territory between Dedza and Ntcheu, before returning to Malawian soil. The colonial-era infrastructure laid the foundation for the modern M1 road, which continues to play a crucial role in Malawi's transportation network.

Prior to independence, a road already existed in the current M1 corridor, connecting to the Tanzanian border. However, the history of the M1 between independence and the 21st century remains largely unclear. In the post-independence era, priority was given to paving the 288-kilometer stretch between Lilongwe and Zomba, as well as the 351-kilometer section between Lilongwe and Mzuzu. The latter was largely completed between 1982 and 1983, with the exception of a remaining unpaved section between Champhoyo and Mbowe, which was finally paved in 1990. The M1 between Chikwawa and Bangula was built as a paved road between 1992 and 1996.

While the road has undergone minimal upgrades, it is uncertain how much of the M1 was paved during the colonial era. Between 2002 and 2008, a nationwide road maintenance program renewed 1,250 kilometers of roads, including 675 kilometers of the M1. Additional maintenance was carried out on significant sections of the M1 in 2009-2010. A bypass for Lilongwe, spanning 14 kilometers, was planned and eventually completed between 2013 and 2014. Finally, a cloverleaf in Lilongwe was inaugurated on September 28, 2020.

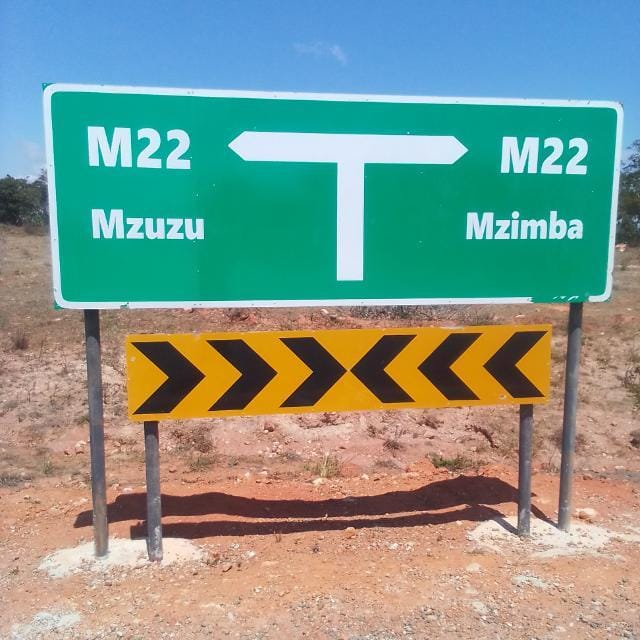
Some M1 branches include the M22 that connects Mzimba and Mzuzu

In southern Malawi, a significant upgrade transformed the 82-kilometer stretch between Chikwawa and Bangula into a modern, nearly 10-meter-wide road between 2010 and 2015. This project was jointly funded by the European Union and the Malawian government. Previously, the M1 in the far south was unpaved, with the tarmac road ending at Nsanje and no modern border crossing with Mozambique. However, a Chinese company constructed a modern road for the 26-kilometer section between Nsanje and the Mozambican border, largely following a new route. Completed in December 2021, this project awaited formal border crossing facilities. Meanwhile, the European Investment Bank financed €136 million of the total €191 million cost to renovate five sections spanning 347 kilometers of the M1, including Karonga-Songwe, Kecheche-Chiweta, Jenda-Mzimba, Kasungu-Jenda, and Kamuzu International Airport to Kasungu. These projects began implementation in 2021. Additionally, toll gates were introduced on the M1 between Lilongwe and Blantyre, with gates opening at Kalinyeke in January 2022 and Chingeni in November 2021.

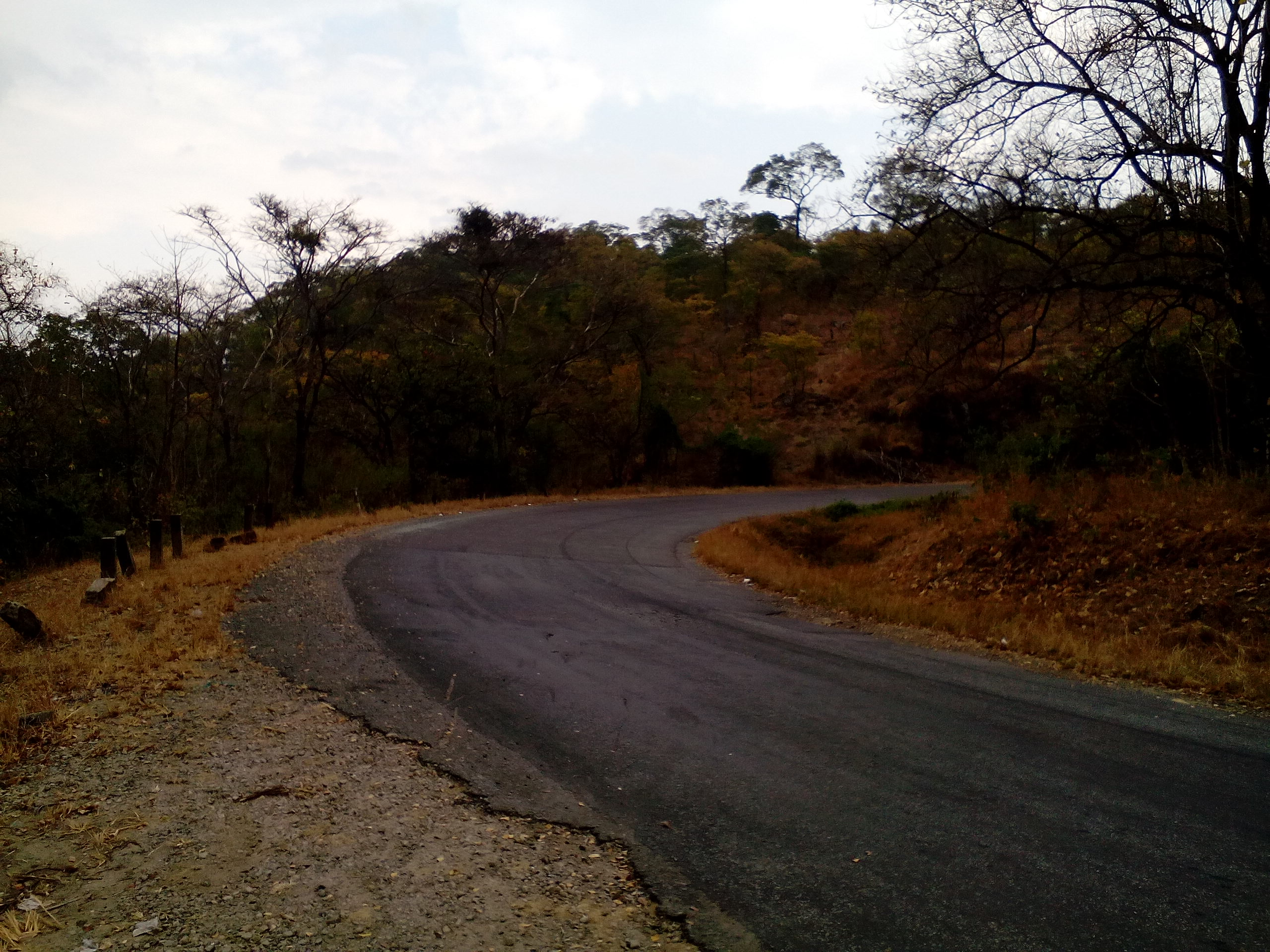
M1 road passing through Rumphi District, northern Malawi.

== Routes ==
=== Northern Region ===
The M1 road begins at the Tanzanian border, where the Songwe River forms the international boundary. From there, it heads southward, transforming into a paved road as it winds its way along the shores of Lake Malawi. The initial stretch is dotted with scattered buildings, but no major towns, until reaching the significant settlement of Kaporo in Karonga where it passes between Mwakabighiri Village and Pemba Moto Village. The road meets Lufira River that crosses it near the residential of Mwakasangira.

The road then follows a lengthy lakeside route to Chiweta, where it turns inland and begins a steep ascent, climbing from 500 to 1,100 meters in altitude. The mountainous region, with peaks reaching 1,500 meters, is traversed by a paved road that continues southward, eventually reaching the central highlands at an elevation of 1,300 meters. Finally, the road arrives in Mzuzu, a town marking the first significant urban center along the route.

=== Central Region ===
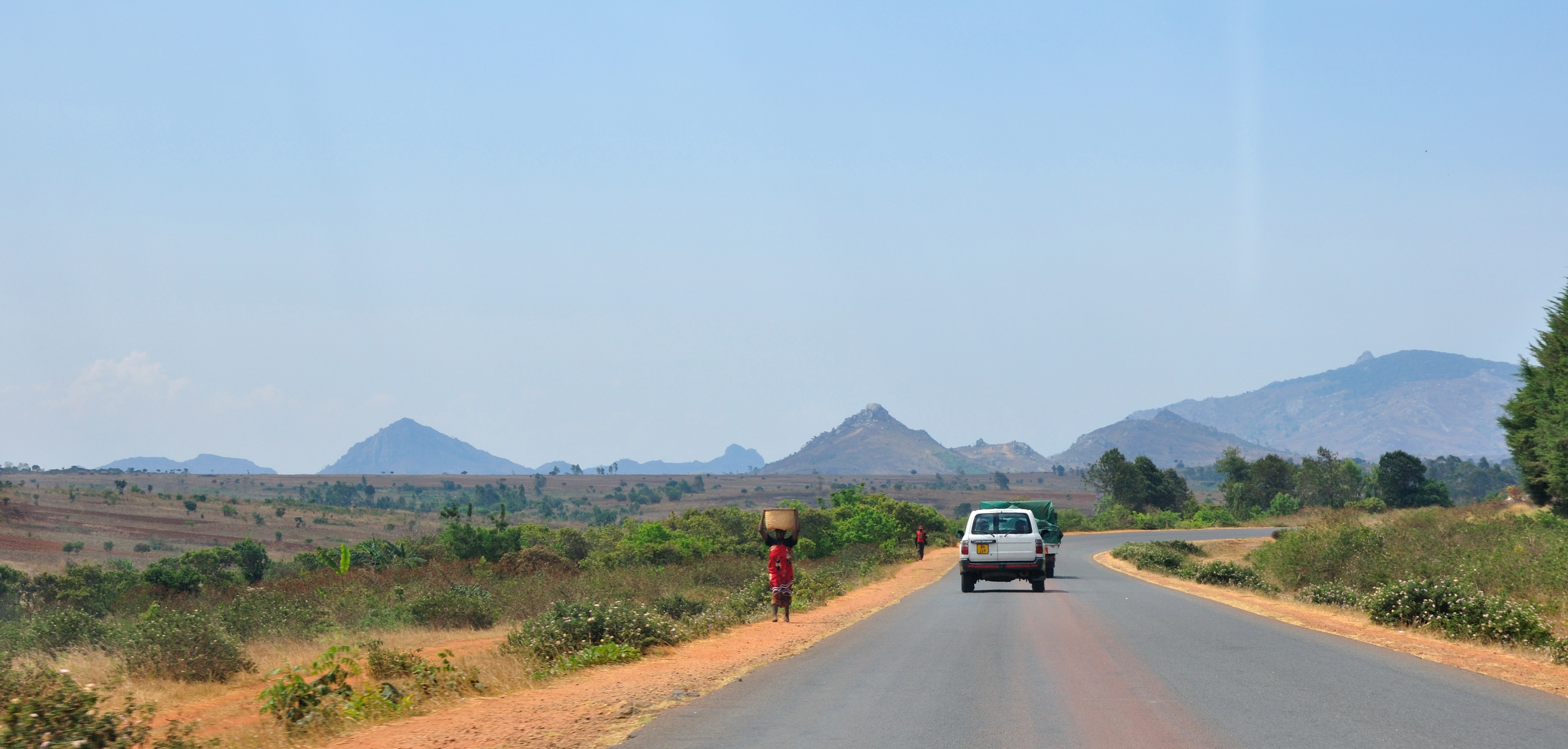
The M1 between Blantyre and Lilongwe

The M1 road continues its journey through the highlands, traversing a more sparsely populated region characterized by forests and rolling savannahs. The road gently ascends to an elevation of 1,800 meters, with gradual changes in altitude. As it approaches Jenda, the road hugs the border with Zambia, then passes through Kasungu and Mponela before reaching the capital city of Lilongwe. At an average altitude of 1,200 meters, the M1 winds its way through the heart of Lilongwe, with a brief stretch of dual carriageways in the north. The road then narrows to a single lane, guiding travelers through the city's center for approximately 20 kilometers.

=== Southern Region ===
From Lilongwe, the M1 road ventures southeast, traversing the savannah plateau dotted with scattered vegetation. As it approaches the Mozambican border, the road passes through the towns of Dedza and Ntcheu, descending gradually to an altitude of approximately 500 meters in southern Malawi. The M1 then winds its way through several smaller towns, eventually arriving in Blantyre, the country's second-largest city. The road cuts straight through the heart of Blantyre, spanning over 15 kilometers of urban landscape. In the city center, the M2 road diverges, and the M1 continues southeast, passing through a mountain range and descending via a winding route to the River Shire. From there, the road follows the river's course at an elevation of less than 100 meters above sea level, traversing the southern tip of Malawi, which is flanked by Mozambique on two sides. Finally, the M1 reaches the provisional border crossing at Marka, where it connects with Mozambique's N300 road, leading to Villa de Senna.

=== Construction of other related roads ===
It was reported by The Nation Newspaper in early 2023 that there were undergoing projects about the start of the M1 project between Lilongwe and Rumphi. The project was expected to cost more than $129 billion, was not started because the ESMP had not been approved.

== See also ==
- Roads in Malawi
