= M4 road (Malawi) =

Road in Malawi

M4 Road

Location
- Country: Malawi
- Regions: Southern
- Major cities: Blantyre, Cisitu

Highway system
- Transport in Malawi; Roads

The M4 road is a road in Malawi. The M4 road serves as an east–west link in southern Malawi, providing a shortcut between Blantyre and Cisitu. As a spur route of the M2, it offers a more direct path for travelers, spanning a total distance of 45 kilometers. The route enables efficient connectivity between key locations in the region.

== History ==
The M4 is thought to be the earliest major route connecting Blantyre, Malawi's industrial heartbeat, to Mozambique, highlighting its historical importance. The road has long played a role in facilitating trade, as it provides access to the port city of Quelimane in Mozambique, an export gateway for Malawi. Although the road's past remains somewhat shrouded in mystery, its significance as a primary transportation artery is undeniable.

== Route ==
The M4 road forms a pivotal link between two key points on the M2, originating in Limbe district of Blantyre and terminating at Cisitu, where it reconnects with the M2. The paved route traverses a densely populated region, winding its way through rolling highlands at an elevation of approximately 800 meters, before ultimately returning to the M2 at its conclusion.

== See also ==
- Roads in Malawi
