= Gospelink Agricultural Training Center, Malawi =

Outreach and mission center in Malawi

Coordinates: 13°24′S 34°18′E

The Gospelink Agricultural Training Center is an outreach and mission center along Lake Malawi in the Salima District of Malawi.

== Description ==
The center serves as a food production center for the local villages while also serving as a training center for local farmers to learn about modern farming techniques and Christian spiritual training.

The center is accessible by a single lane improved loose-surfaced road that extends from the M5 which links Salima and Mzuzu.

=== Agriculture ===
The Gospelink Agricultural Training Center consists of nearly 1000 acres and borders the west coast of Lake Malawi.

Irrigation from the lake enables the growing of sugar cane and rice in the nearby fields. The center also runs a rice mill for grinding and husking rice. The nearest village to the town is Salui, which is less than 500 meters due south of the irrigation station along Lake Malawi. The sealed-pump well provides water to the workers and for some gardening, while a second open-air well provides additional water for irrigation. In 2010, the agricultural center started both a chicken project and a goat farming project.

In 2011, the center began efforts towards fish farming aquaculture.
