= Chiringa =

Malawian town

- Map of Malawi showing the location of Chiringa.
- Coordinates: 15°46′32″S 35°46′02″E
- Country: Malawi
- Region: Southern Region
- District: Phalombe District
- Elevation: 1,700 m (5,600 ft)
- Time zone: UTC+2 (CAT)

Chiringa is a town in Malawi.

== Location ==
Chiringa is located approximately 20 kilometres (12 mi), by road, east of Phalombe, where the district headquarters are located. This is approximately 104 kilometres (65 mi), by road, east of Blantyre, the financial capital of Malawi and the largest city in Malawi's Southern Region. The geographical coordinates of Chiringa, Malawi are 15°46'32.0"S, 35°46'02.0"E (Latitude:-15.775556; Longitude:35.767222).

== Overview ==
Chiringa lies along the Muloza–Chiringa Road (T415 Road), which continues north-westwards to Migowi, about 13 kilometres (8 mi) from Chiringa. The Migowi–Chiringa Road is already tarmacked, as of May 2019.

There is a post office and a branch of First Discount House Bank in Chiringa. Chiringa, like many localities in the country, is water stressed. This photograph shows a power truck drilling a borehole in Chiringa, Malawi.

== Notable people ==
- Ken Lipenga: Member of Parliament for Phalombe East Constituency, was born in Chiringa on 14 February 1952.

== See also ==
- Mulanje
