= Donald Fraser (missionary) =

Scottish missionary and author

The Reverend Donald Fraser
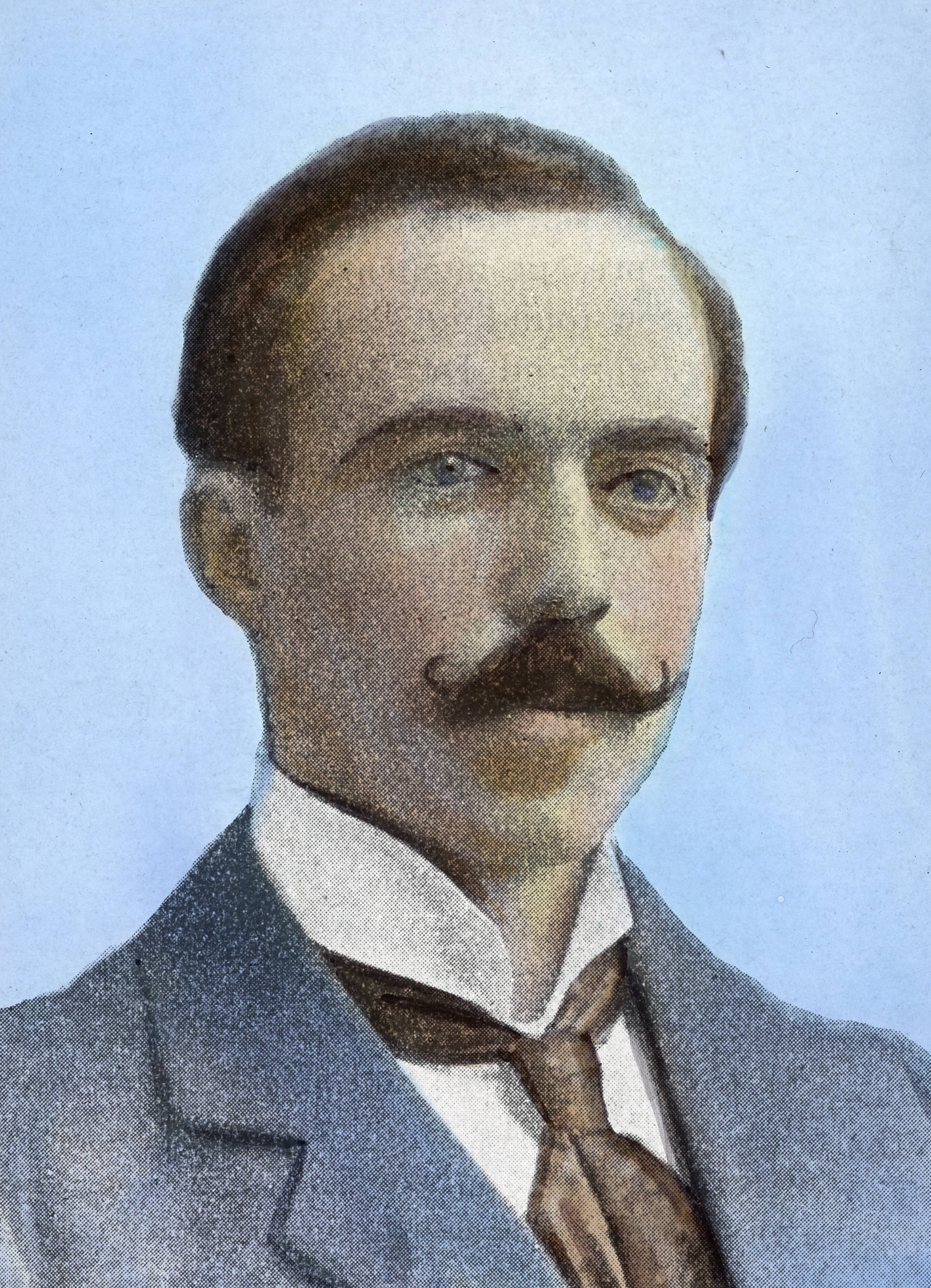
- Fraser, circa 1910
- Born: 1 June 1870; Lochgilphead, Argyll, Scotland
- Died: 20 August 1933 (aged 63); Glasgow, Scotland

Donald Fraser (1 June 1870 – 20 August 1933) was a Free Church of Scotland missionary in Africa and author of six non-fiction books about his almost three decades of work there.

== Biography ==
Born in the town of Lochgilphead, Argyll, in western Scotland, Fraser was the fourth of eight children born to The Reverend William Fraser (1824–1892), minister of the Free Church of Scotland in Lochgilphead, and Violet Ferguson (1835–1888). His older brother was the architect William Fraser.

In 1886, at age 16, Fraser began studies at the University of Glasgow but in 1891, before completing his degree, he entered the Free Church College in Glasgow (now Trinity College, Glasgow) to study for the ministry and was ordained in 1896.

During the first half of the 1890s, Fraser played an instrumental role in the founding of the Great Britain branch of the Student Volunteer Movement (SVM), with which he served as traveling secretary, and the World Student Christian Federation.

He began his missionary work in Africa in 1896 when he was assigned to the Free Church of Scotland mission in Livingstonia, Malawi to work with the Ngoni people.

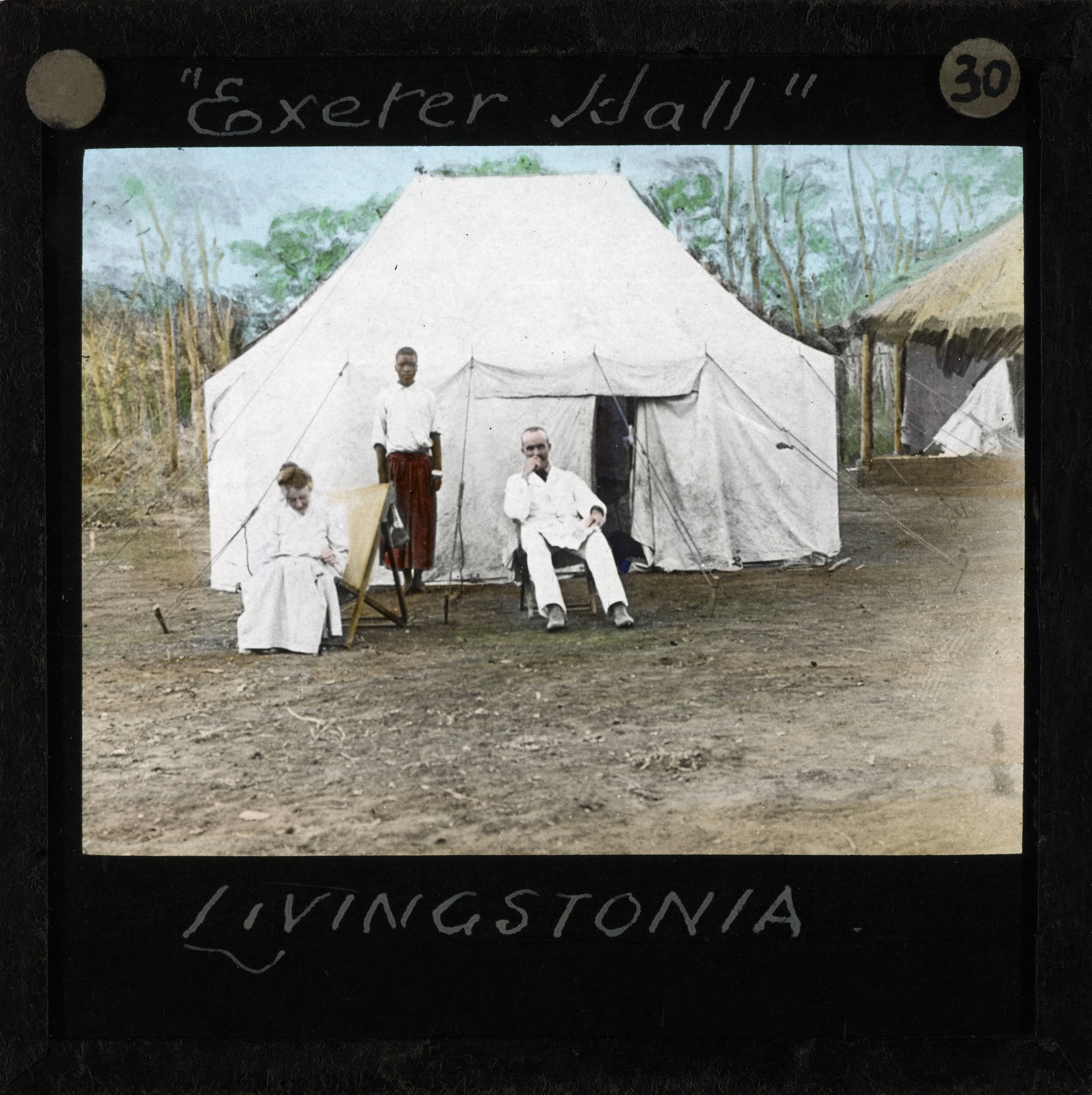
Rev. Donald Fraser and Dr. Agnes Fraser in Malawi, circa 1910

Due to the merger of the Free Church of Scotland with the United Presbyterian Church of Scotland, from 1900 Fraser served the United Free Church of Scotland.

In 1901, Fraser married Dr. Agnes Renton Robson (1874–1960) who held Bachelor of Medicine, Bachelor of Surgery degrees from the University of Glasgow and became a medical missionary working alongside Rev. Fraser.

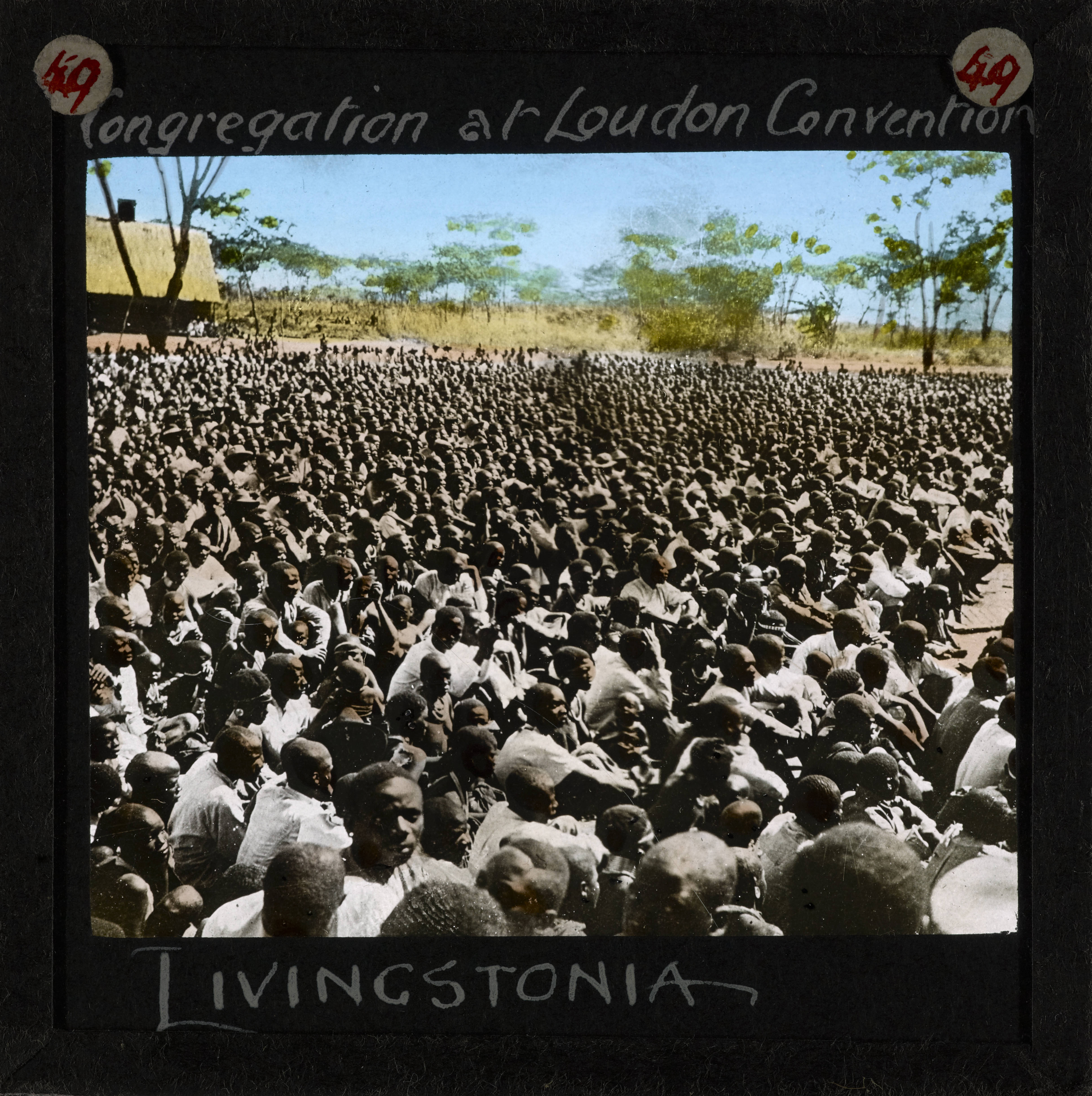
A congregation attending one of Fraser's conventions at Loudon Mission, Embangweni, Malawi, circa 1910

In 1902, when Malawi was suffering from a famine, the Ngoni invited Rev. Fraser and Dr. Fraser to move with them to Embangweni in northern Malawi, where the Frasers founded the Loudon Mission Station, which included a church, a school and the Loudon Mission Hospital, which today is still operating under the name Embangweni Mission Hospital.

At Loudon Station, Rev. Fraser introduced many innovative practices and policies that were respectful of and responsive to the customs and traditions of the Ngoni people, including: week-long conventions that attracted thousands of Ngoni men, women and children; championing the creation of vernacular village schools; and encouraging indigenous church music and local leadership in the church, including Ngoni women elders. Rev. Fraser's missionary work was the subject of extensive research and analysis by the late T. Jack Thompson, an Irish mission historian and scholar of African Christianity.

In 1922, Fraser received an honorary Doctor of Divinity degree from the University of Glasgow, and he was elected Moderator of the 1922–23 General Assembly of the United Free Church of Scotland.

Fraser returned to Scotland permanently in 1925, and from 1929 to 1933, he served as Chaplain-in-Ordinary in Scotland in the Ecclesiastical Household of George V, King of the United Kingdom and the British Dominions, and Emperor of India.

Fraser died in Glasgow, Scotland on 20 August 1933 aged 63. His wife Dr. Fraser returned his ashes to Malawi for burial at Loudon Mission Station. The following year, she published her biography of Rev. Fraser and then served as a medical missionary at the Copperbelt Mission in Zambia.

== Family ==
Rev. Fraser and Dr. Fraser had four children: Violet; George; Donald; and Catherine. One of their grandchildren, Peter Fraser, Baron Fraser of Carmyllie (1945–2013), was the son of George Robson Fraser, who followed in his father's footsteps and became a Church of Scotland minister and missionary in Zambia.

== Works by Donald Fraser ==
- The Future of Africa (1911) ISBN 978-1177904872, 978-0837141138
- Winning a Primitive People: Sixteen Years' Work Among the Warlike Tribe of the Ngoni and the Senga and Tumbuka Peoples of Central Africa (1914) ISBN 978-1279711040
- Livingstonia: The Story of Our Mission (1915) https://searchworks.stanford.edu/view/626419], Stanford Libraries, Stanford University
- African Idylls (1923) ISBN 978-0837123547
- The Autobiography of an African (1925) ISBN 978-0837156538
- The New Africa (1927) ISBN 978-0837119144

== Works about Donald Fraser ==
- Donald Fraser of Livingstonia, Fraser, Agnes R. (1934) ASIN B0008602CW
- Christianity in Northern Malaŵi: Donald Fraser's Missionary Methods and Ngoni Culture, Thompson, T. Jack (1995) ISBN 978-9004102088

== Historical images ==
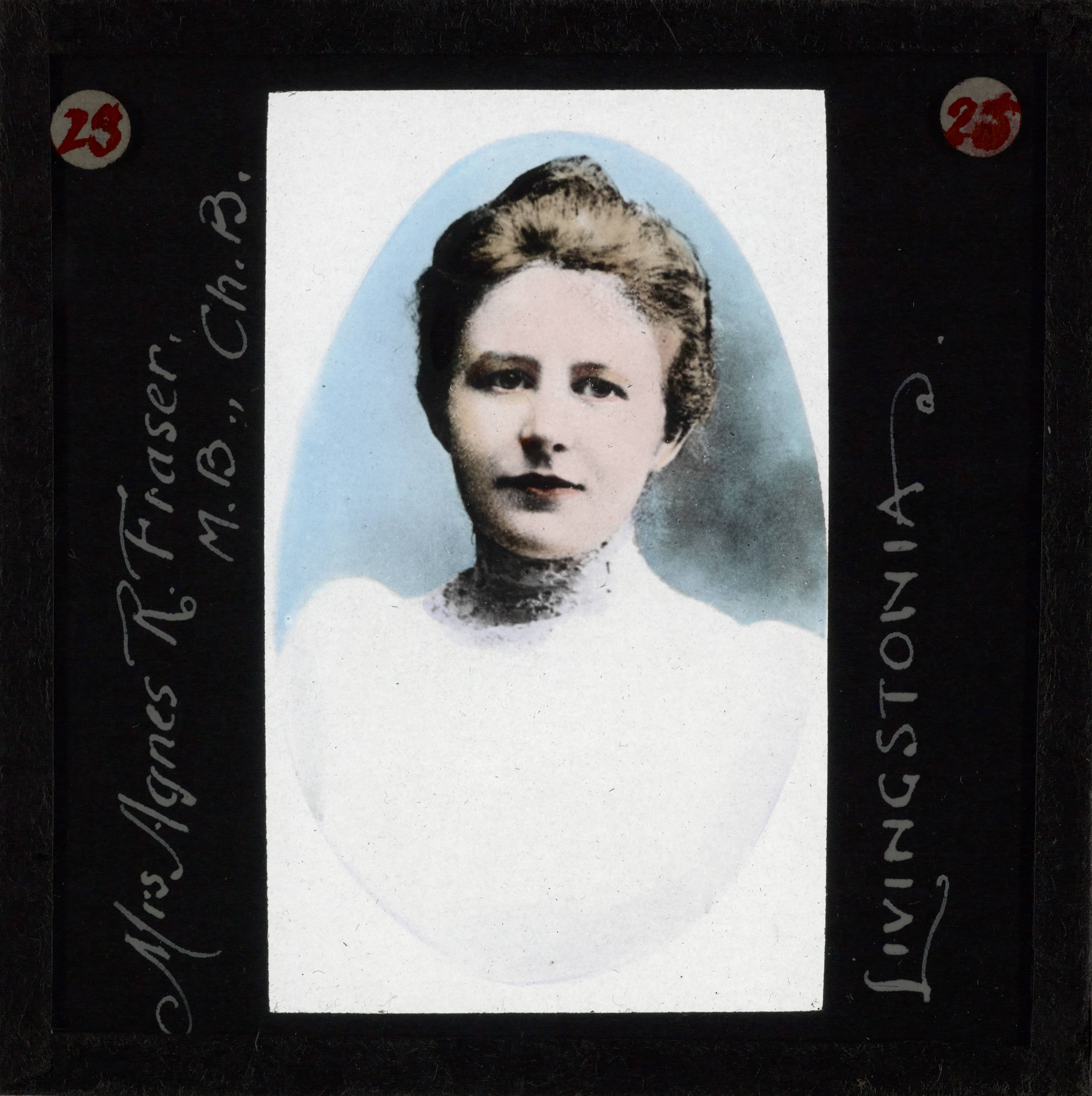
Portrait circa 1910 of Dr. Agnes R. Fraser, medical missionary to Africa and wife of the Scottish missionary Rev. Donald Fraser. Centre for the Study of World Christianity, University of Edinburgh.

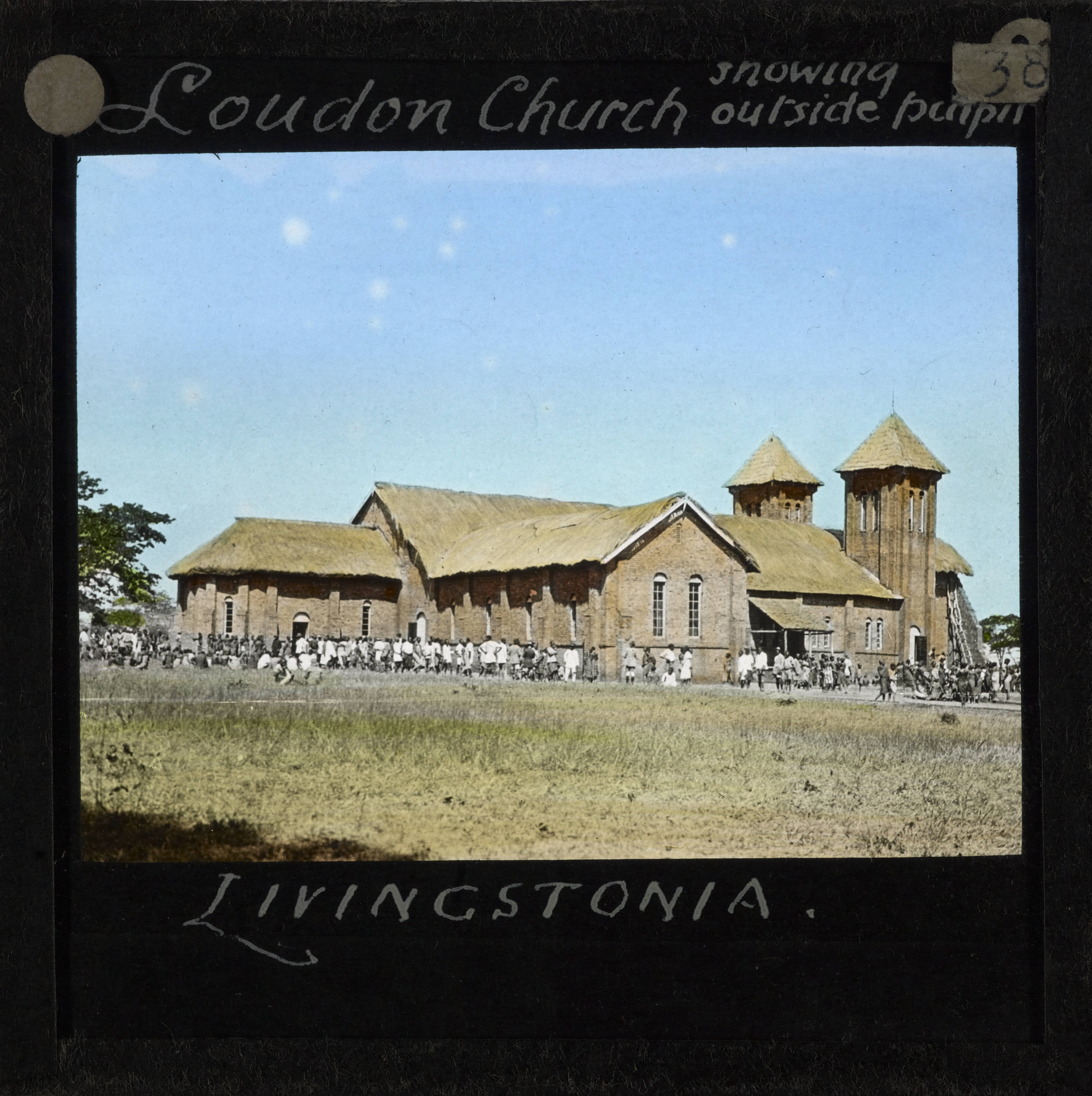
Loudon Mission Church, Embangweni, Malawi, circa 1910. Centre for the Study of World Christianity, University of Edinburgh.

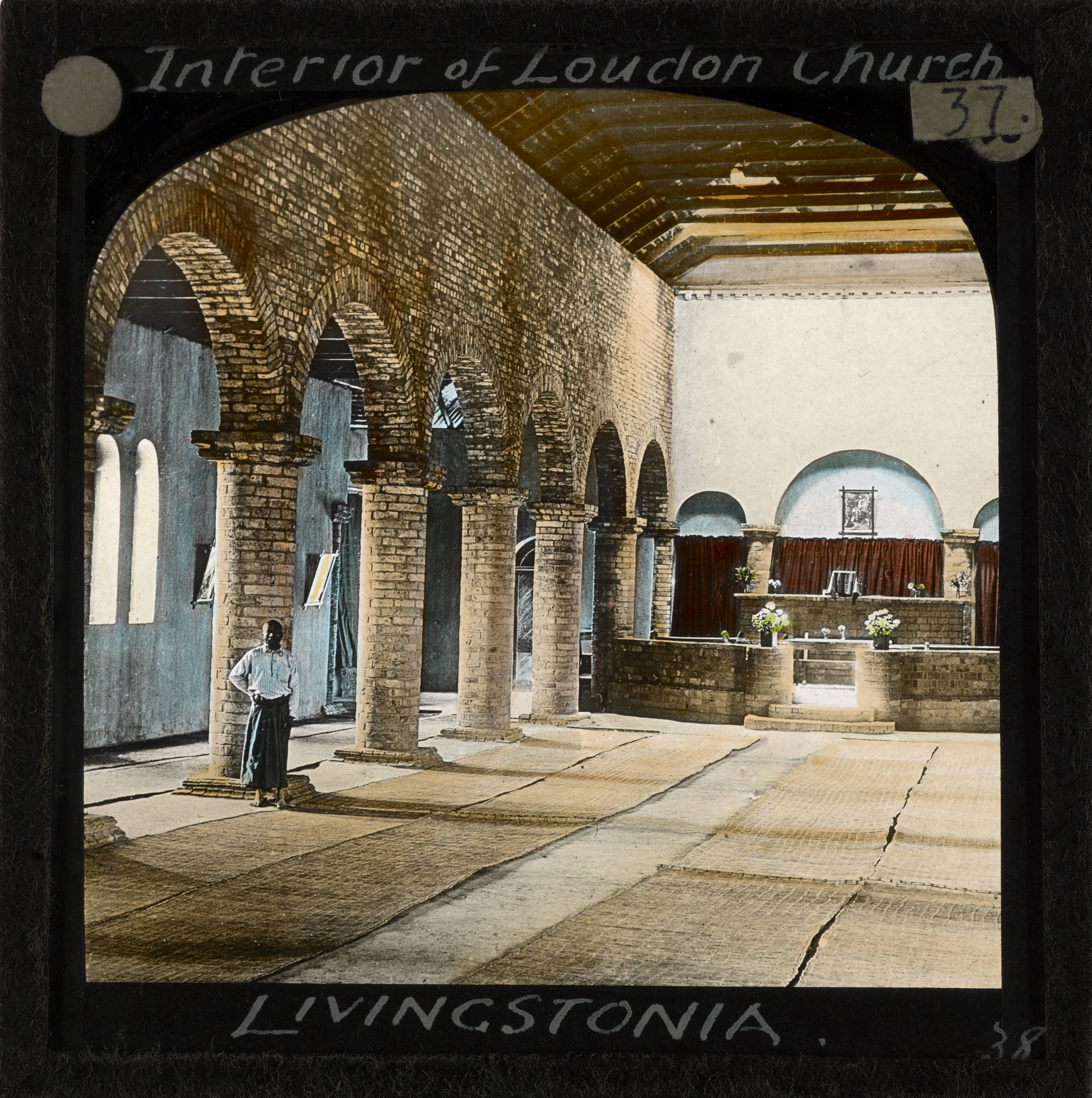
The interior of Loudon Mission Church, circa 1910. Centre for the Study of World Christianity, University of Edinburgh.

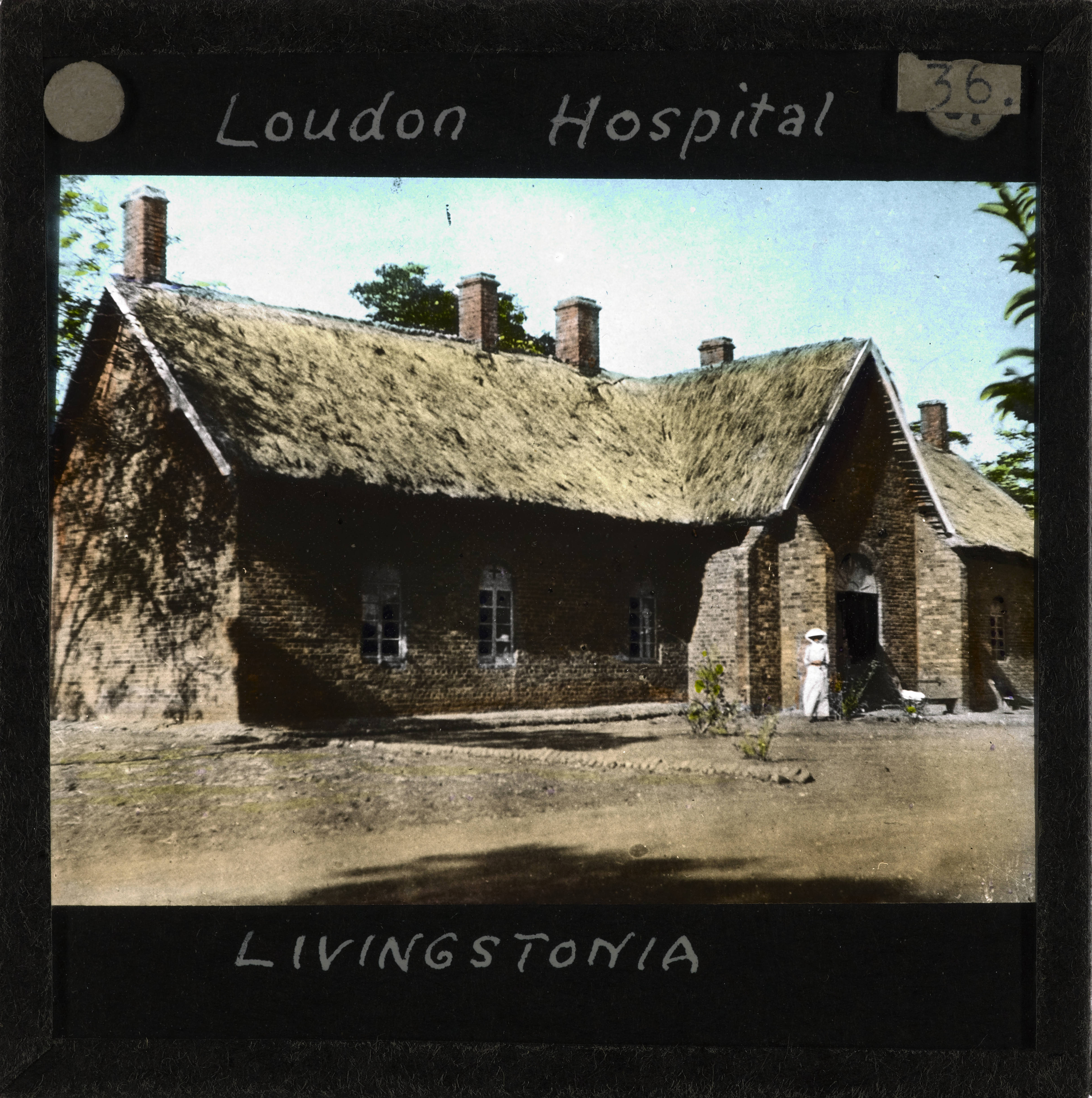
Loudon Hospital, Embangweni, Malawi, circa 1910. Centre for the Study of World Christianity, University of Edinburgh.

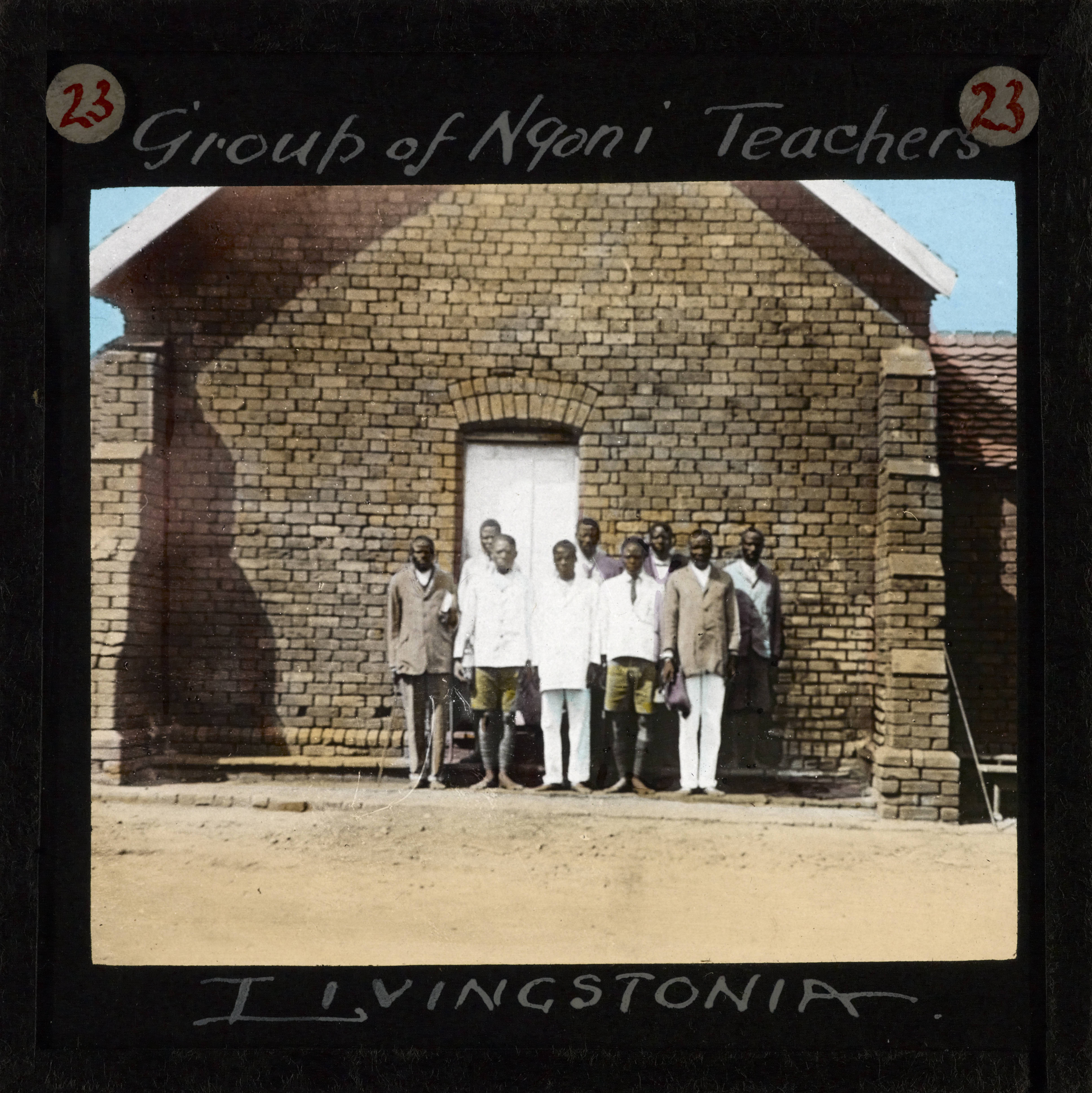
A group of African men, all Ngoni teachers, circa 1910. Centre for the Study of World Christianity, University of Edinburgh.

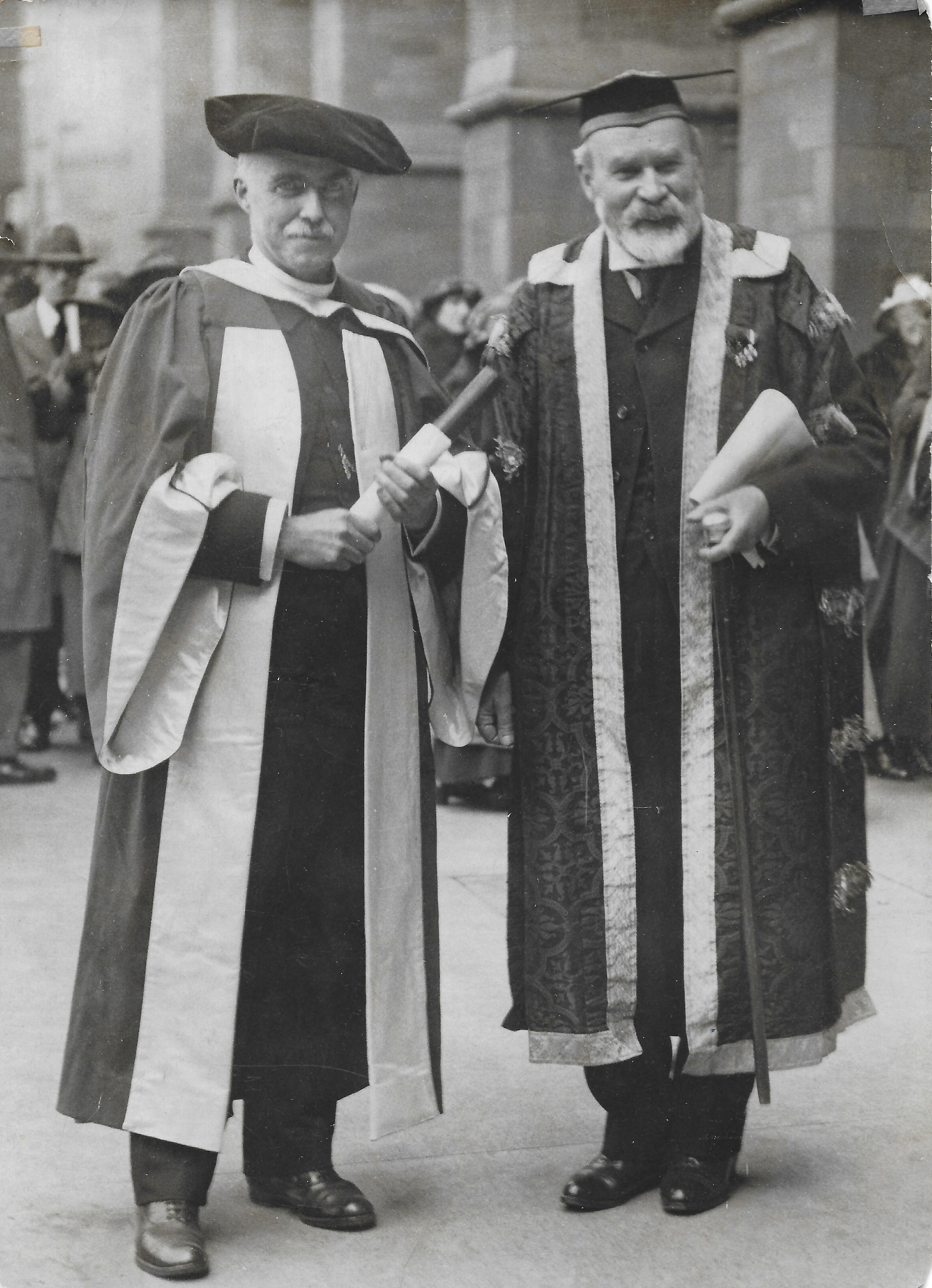
Rev. Donald Fraser (left) with Sir Donald MacAlister, Principal, University of Glasgow on the occasion in 1922 of Rev. Fraser receiving an honorary Doctor of Divinity degree from the university. Private Collection.

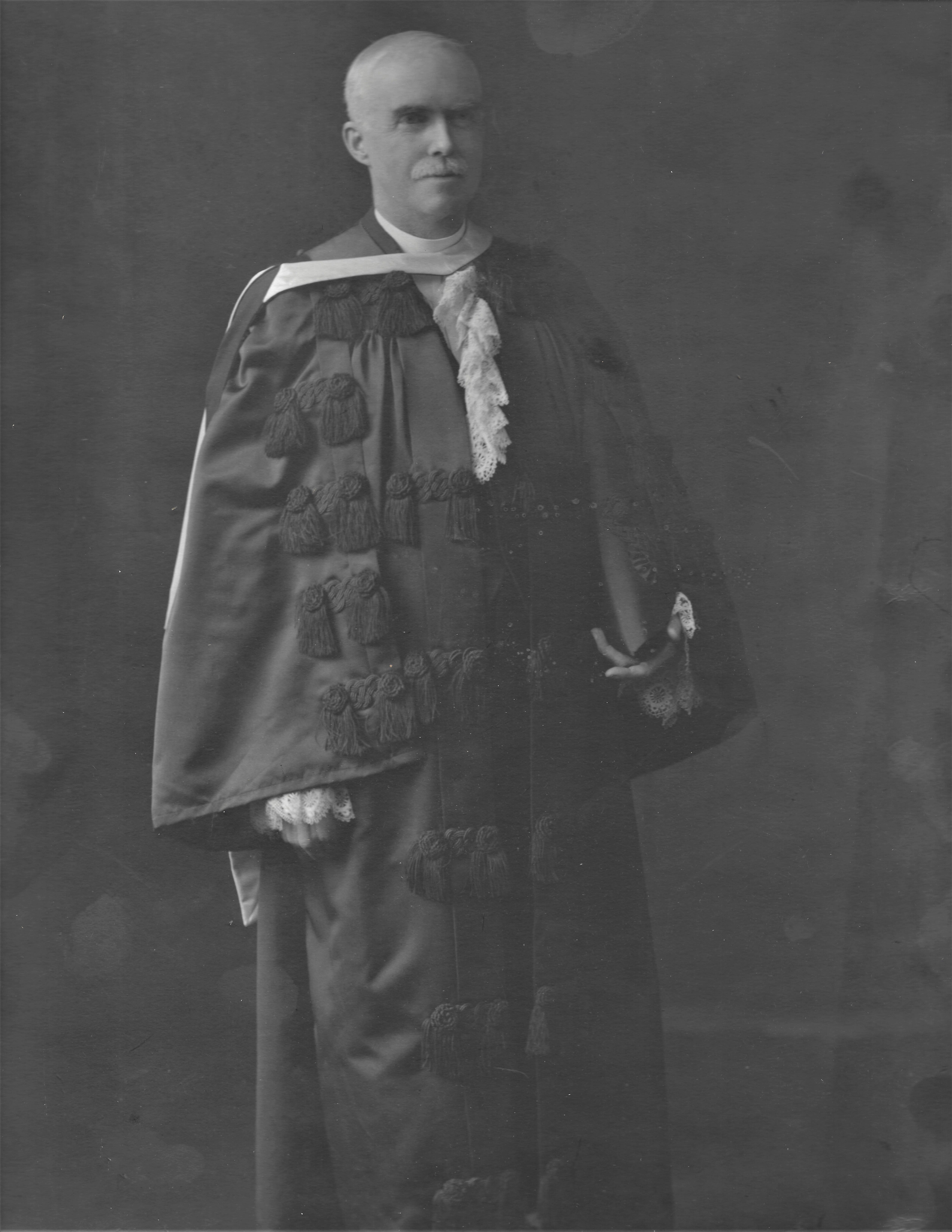
The Very Reverend Dr. Donald Fraser, DD, wearing his robes of office as Moderator of the United Free Church of Scotland, 1922–23. Private Collection.
