= M18 road (Malawi) =

Road in Malawi

M18 Road

Location
- Country: Malawi
- Regions: Central
- Major cities: Kasungu, Nkhotakota

Highway system
- Transport in Malawi; Roads

The M18 road is a road in Malawi that runs about 113 kilometers to connect the town of Kasungu with the lakeside district of Nkhotakota, situated on the scenic shores of Lake Malawi. The east-west route traverses the heart of the country, playing a role in facilitating travel, trade, and commerce between the region's interior and the lake's coastal areas.

== Route ==
The M18 road embarks from the quaint town of Kasungu, where it intersects with the M1, and unfolds as a paved thoroughfare that winds its way eastward across the rolling savannah highlands, situated at an elevation of approximately 1,100 meters. As it traverses this expansive, open landscape dotted with scattered structures, the M18 converges with the M7 at Malomo. The journey then takes a dramatic turn, entering a lush, densely forested nature reserve, where the road gently descends toward the majestic Lake Malawi. Notably, this segment of the route transitions to a dirt road, but as it emerges from the nature park, the M18 reverts to a paved surface, ultimately leading to the charming regional town of Nkhotakota, nestled on the shores of Lake Malawi and intersecting with the M5.

== History ==
The M18 road serves as a regional link, and its infrastructure has undergone several enhancements over the years. Initially, only the section originating from Kasungu was paved, but by the early 2000s, the paved surface had been extended to the Malomo area, improving connectivity. However, the passage through the breathtaking Nkhotakhota Wildlife Reserve has retained its natural, unpaved state, allowing for an immersive experience amidst the reserve's beauty. Beyond the reserve, the road was upgraded with a paved surface in the late 2000s, ensuring a smoother journey toward the eastern reaches of the route.

== See also ==
- Roads in Malawi
