= M7 road (Malawi) =

Road in Malawi

M7 Road

Location
- Country: Malawi
- Regions: Central
- Major cities: Lilongwe, Mbobo

Highway system
- Transport in Malawi; Roads

The M7 road is a road in Malawi that stretches 83 kilometers through the heart of the country. The route traverses a north–south trajectory, connecting the region north of the capital city Lilongwe to the town of Mbobo, providing a link between central Malawi's major population centers and economic hubs.

== History ==
The M7 road has undergone significant transformations over the years. Initially, it was a dirt track, albeit a well-maintained one. A major upgrade took place between 2009 and 2011, when the southernmost 12-kilometer stretch was paved, reaching Dowa. Further enhancements followed in 2019, with a short section in Mbobo being asphalted. Most recently, in 2021, plans were unveiled to pave the entire remaining length of the M7, promising a smoother and more efficient journey for travelers along this critical route.

== Route ==
The M7 branches off from the M1 approximately 20 kilometers north of Lilongwe, embarking on a diverse journey. Initially, the road is paved, stretching up to Dowa, but it then transitions into a rugged dirt path that winds its way through the highlands, reaching elevations of 1,200 to 1,400 meters above sea level. The route passes through rural villages, offering a glimpse into traditional life. As the M7 approaches its northern terminus at Mbobo, the final few kilometers are once again paved, reconnecting with the M18 and providing a smoother conclusion to the journey.

== See also ==
- Roads in Malawi
