= Embangweni =

Human settlement in Malawi

Coordinates: 12°08′32″S 33°28′19″E

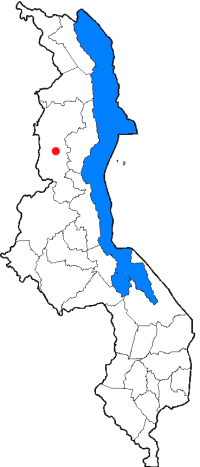
Location of Mzimba in Malawi

The town of Embangweni is located in the Mzimba district in the Northern Region of Malawi. Its population is approximately 5,000 people. Embangweni is some two hours away from Mzuzu.

It contains a Hospital, Church, School for the Hard of Hearing, Robert Laws Secondary School and a primary school.

== Hospital ==
Embangweni Hospital is a 134-bed hospital which serves a population of about 100,000 people. It operates three remote health centers located in Kalikumbi, Mabiri, and Mpasazi.

== History ==
Work to establish the Embangweni Station, by the Reverend Donald Fraser and his wife, Dr. Agnes Fraser, missionaries of the Free Church of Scotland. Donald Fraser had arrived in Malawi at the end of 1896. Clinical work began at the hospital in 1902 when Malawi was suffering from a famine. The Ngoni invited Rev. Fraser and Dr. Fraser to move with them to Embangweni, which included a church, a school and the Loudon Mission Hospital, which now operates under the name Embangweni Mission Hospital.

At Loudon Station, Rev. Fraser introduced many innovative practices and policies that were respectful of and responsive to the customs and traditions of the Ngoni people, including: week-long conventions that attracted thousands of Ngoni men, women and children; championing the creation of vernacular village schools; and encouraging indigenous church music and local leadership in the church, including Ngoni women elders.

== Schools ==
The Loudon (previously Embangweni) Full Primary School has over 1300 students and 17 teachers. It was founded in 1904 by Scottish missionaries. In 2002 they opened a new Library and Administration building, funded largely by a church in the USA.

The Embangweni School for the Hard of Hearing was founded in 1994. It is one of three such schools serving the needs of the hearing impaired in Malawi. In 2003, it was serving over 120 students with 11 teachers. In 2002, the school, along with the rest of the Embangweni Station, received electricity.
