= Ntaja, Malawi =

Village in Malawi

Coordinates: 14.873°S 35.518°E

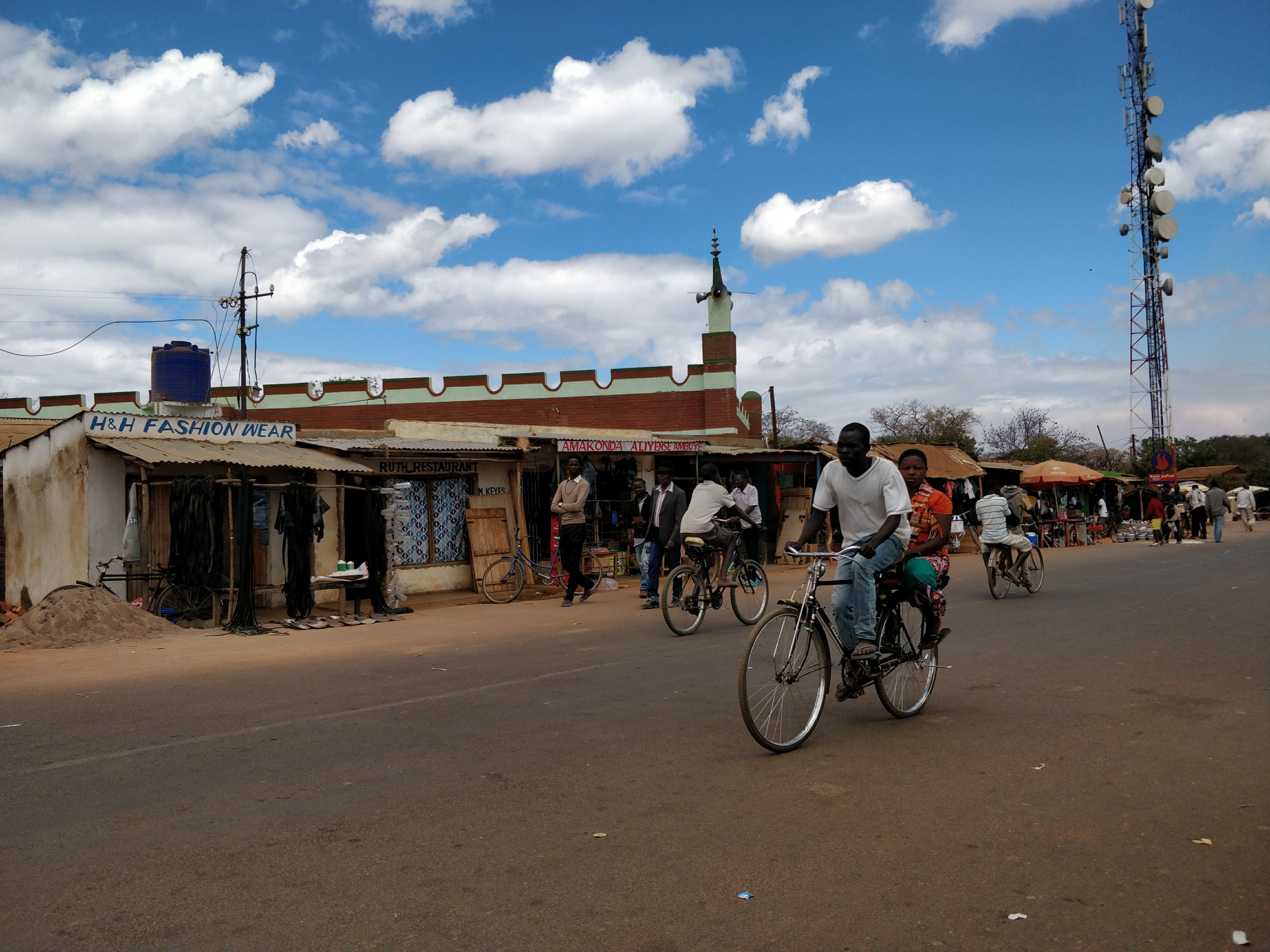
Ntaja village

Ntaja is a village in Machinga District in Malawi. The Ntaja health centre is located there.
