= Muloza =

Muloza Muloza
- Country: Malawi

Muloza is a village in Malawi on the border with Mozambique. It is 20 miles south of Mulanje and the Mulanje Massif and is a significant source of the country's maize.
