= Namitete =

- Location in Malawi
- Coordinates: 14°01′S 33°21′E
- Country: Malawi
- Region: Central Region
- District: Lilongwe District
- Time zone: +2
- Climate: Cwa

Namitete is a town located in the Central Region district of Lilongwe in Malawi.
