= Zalewa =

Human settlement in Malawi

Coordinates: 15.4436°S 34.8639°E

Zalewa is a town in Malawi, specifically in the Southern Region. The Shire River passes through it. It borders Blantyre and Neno districts.

There is a road block by the side of the bridge, which crosses the Shire river. Normally passengers and motorists passing through the bridge have to disembark from their vehicles so that the police can search the vehicles for illegal items.

There is a lot of irrigation farming activity in Zalewa with farmers utilising the waters of Shire river. Fresh maize and vegetables can be found throughout the year.
