= M2 road (Malawi) =

Road in Malawi

M2 Road

Location
- Country: Malawi
- Regions: Southern
- Major cities: Blantyre, Mulanje, Thyolo

Highway system
- Transport in Malawi; Roads

The M2 is one of the main roads in Malawi. The road works as transportation artery in Malawi, stretching 113 kilometers in east-west direction across the southern region. Beginning in Blantyre, the country's second-largest city, the M2 traverses the scenic landscape to reach the border with Mozambique at Thornwood, providing a link between the two countries.

== History ==
Historically, the M2 has served as the primary artery connecting Malawi to Mozambique, facilitating trade and commerce through the strategic port city of Quelimane. As the former capital and industrial hub of Malawi, Blantyre remains a center for the country's exports.

Notably, the road linking Blantyre to Mulanje was one of the few paved routes at the time of independence in 1964, although its narrow width limited its capacity. Despite this, the M2 has continued to play a crucial role in Malawi's economic development.

The M2 held a unique distinction for many years, boasting the only dual carriageway stretch in Malawi. The road between Blantyre and its neighboring city of Limbe was upgraded to two lanes in each direction by the 1990s, a rarity in the country at the time. Later, in the late 2000s, the section connecting the M1 to the eastern part of Blantyre was also widened to dual carriageways, further enhancing the road's capacity and efficiency.

== Route ==
From its starting point in Blantyre, the M2 road initially follows a dual-carriageway path through the city, before turning south and deviating from the more direct eastern route taken by the M4. Instead, the M2 winds its way through the picturesque highlands, gradually descending from an altitude of 1,200 meters to 700 meters.

The stretch passes through relatively densely populated countryside, eventually reunifying with the M4 at Cisitu. The M2 then skirts the base of the majestic Mulanje Massif, Malawi's highest mountain range, which soars to an impressive 3,002 meters. However, the road itself remains at a relatively low altitude of around 600 meters. Finally, the M2 reaches the Mozambican border at Thornwood, where it seamlessly connects with the N11, leading onwards to the historic port city of Quelimane.

== See also ==
- Roads in Malawi
