= M5 road (Malawi) =

Highway in Malawi

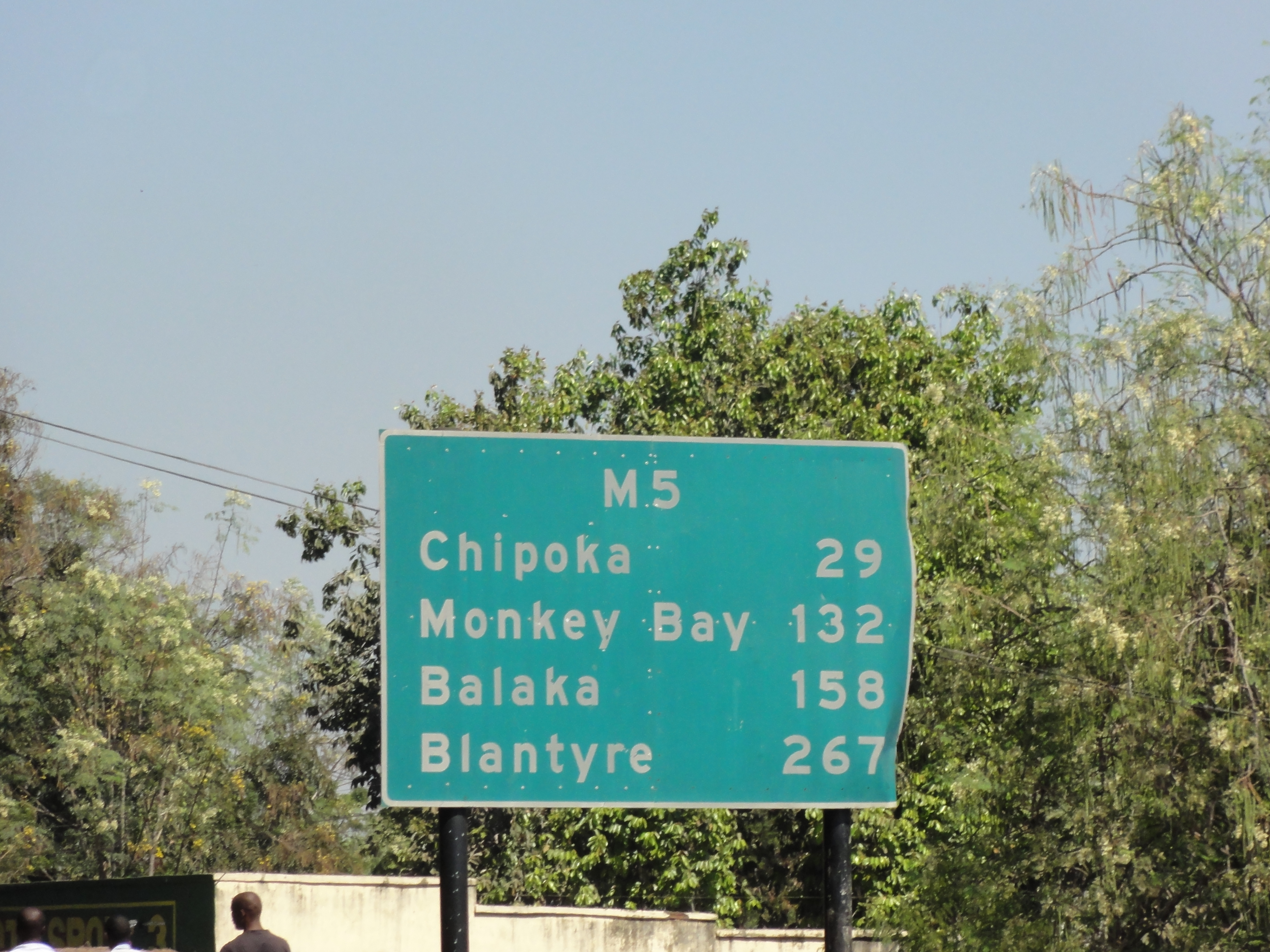
Distances from Salima south on the M5

The M5 road, also known as the Lakeshore Road, is a highway in Malawi that runs north-south from Mzuzu to a junction with the M1 northwest of Balaka Township. For much of its length it roughly follows the western shore of Lake Malawi.

The M5 road suffers occasional closures due to heavy rain causing river flooding and washouts of bridges or their approaches. Bridges are sometimes replaced by temporary bailey bridges. Luwadzi Bridge was damaged in March 2002, and the Nankokwe Bridge was damaged in February 2003. Malawi received international aid from Japan to improve nine bridges along the highway. In 2020, a portion of the M5 road between Salima and Nkhotakota was closed at the Chikwawa Trading Center due to washout of the Lingadzi Bridge approach. In 2012, Malawi applied for a loan from the African Development Bank to rehabilitate and widen the segment from Mzuzu to Nkhata Bay.

In 2022, the deterioration of the Chingeni-Balaka-Zomba segment (blamed on funding misallocation by former president Peter Mutharika) became a national political issue. A K37 billion rehabilitation of a 60 km Salima-Benga segment by China Railway 20 began in November, 2022, and was expected to complete in December, 2024. The government obtained a loan from the African Development Bank for rehabilitation of a 104 km segment from Benga to Dwangwa, scheduled to start in April, 2024.
