= Mzimba =

- Location in Malawi
- Coordinates: 11°54′S 33°36′E
- Country: Malawi
- Region: Northern Region
- District: Mzimba District

Population (2018 Census)
  - Total: 26,096
- Time zone: +2
- Climate: Cwa

Mzimba is a town in the Mzimba District of Malawi. The district is inhabited by descendants of Tumbuka and few Ngoni people.

The district of Mzimba has a number of Traditional Authorities from the Ngoni people. The head of these Traditional Authorities, or Paramount Chief (Inkosi), is M'Mbelwa V.

Formerly an administrative centre, the town has declined in importance since 1940. The surrounding region includes the Mzimba Plain, the northern extension of the Central Region Plateau, Mount Hora (5,742 feet [1,750 metres]), and the Viphya Mountains. Poor soils support subsistence agriculture, as well as a Turkish-tobacco cash crop. Pop. (2008) 20,756.

== Climate ==
Climate data for Mzimba (1961–1990)
Month	Jan	Feb	Mar	Apr	May	Jun	Jul	Aug	Sep	Oct	Nov	Dec	Year
Mean daily maximum °C (°F)	25.4 (77.7)	25.6 (78.1)	25.7 (78.3)	25.3 (77.5)	24.5 (76.1)	22.8 (73.0)	22.4 (72.3)	23.6 (74.5)	26.1 (79.0)	27.9 (82.2)	28.2 (82.8)	26.4 (79.5)	25.3 (77.5)
Daily mean °C (°F)	20.3 (68.5)	20.4 (68.7)	20.4 (68.7)	19.9 (67.8)	18.3 (64.9)	16.3 (61.3)	16.1 (61.0)	17.6 (63.7)	20.1 (68.2)	22.3 (72.1)	22.2 (72.0)	21.0 (69.8)	19.6 (67.3)
Mean daily minimum °C (°F)	16.3 (61.3)	16.2 (61.2)	16.1 (61.0)	15.7 (60.3)	13.5 (56.3)	10.8 (51.4)	10.5 (50.9)	15.1 (59.2)	14.2 (57.6)	16.7 (62.1)	17.3 (63.1)	16.7 (62.1)	14.9 (58.8)
Average precipitation mm (inches)	229.5 (9.04)	191.5 (7.54)	164.0 (6.46)	43.3 (1.70)	8.4 (0.33)	0.9 (0.04)	0.9 (0.04)	0.3 (0.01)	0.6 (0.02)	5.0 (0.20)	55.9 (2.20)	203.0 (7.99)	903.3 (35.56)
Average precipitation days (≥ 0.3 mm)	20	18	16	7	2	1	2	1	1	2	7	18	95
Average relative humidity (%)	83	84	83	79	74	71	69	63	56	55	63	79	72
Mean monthly sunshine hours	142.6	140.0	173.6	216.0	266.6	267.0	272.8	297.6	303.0	313.1	240.0	164.3	2,796.6
Mean daily sunshine hours	4.6	5.0	5.6	7.2	8.6	8.9	8.8	9.6	10.1	10.1	8.0	5.3	7.7
Source: NOAA

== Demographics ==
=== Mzimba Population by Ethnic Group ===
Ethnic Group	Tumbuka	Chewa	Ngoni	Tonga	Others
Percentage	86.25%	5.19%	6.61%	5.23%	8.72%

=== Mzimba Population by Religion ===
Religion	Christian	Islam	Others	No Religion
Percentage	88.53%	1.72%	9.52%	0.23%

Year	Population
1977	4,962
1987	7,687
1998	13,742
2008	20,994
2018	26,096

== Notable residents ==
- Goodall Edward Gondwe Former Minister of Finance and a Politician.
- Mwayi Kumwenda Malawi star and international Netball player.
- Theresa Mkandawire, first woman prof of civil engineering in Malawi was born here
