= Transport in Malawi =

Transportation in Malawi is poorly developed. The country of almost 23 million has 39 airports, 6 with paved runways and 33 with unpaved runways. It has 797 kilometres (495 miles) of railways, all narrow-gauge and about 45 percent of its roads are paved. Though it is landlocked, Malawi also has 700 km (435 mi) of waterways on Lake Malawi and along the Shire River.

== Highways ==
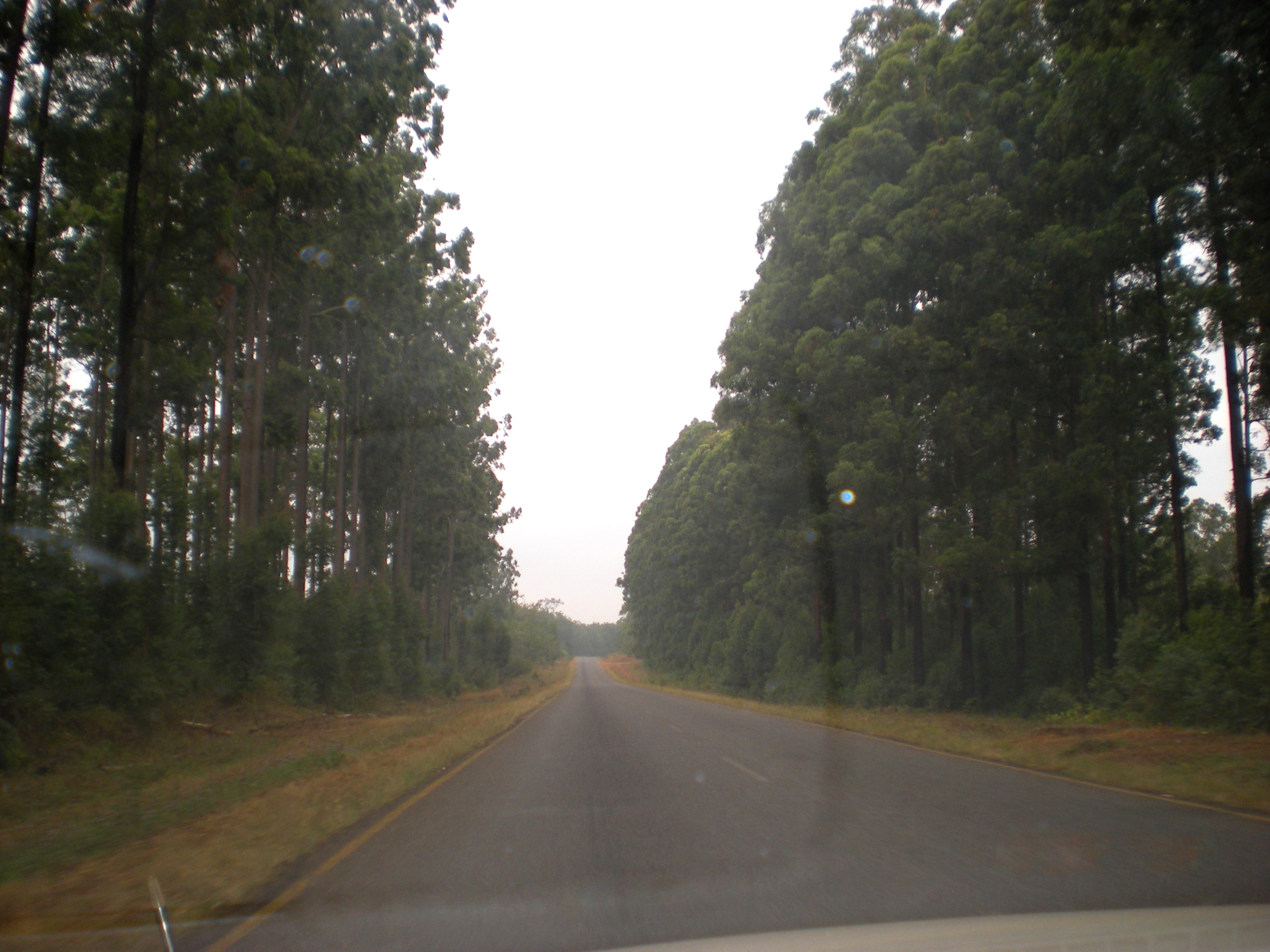
Road to Mzuzu through the Chikangawa man-made forest.

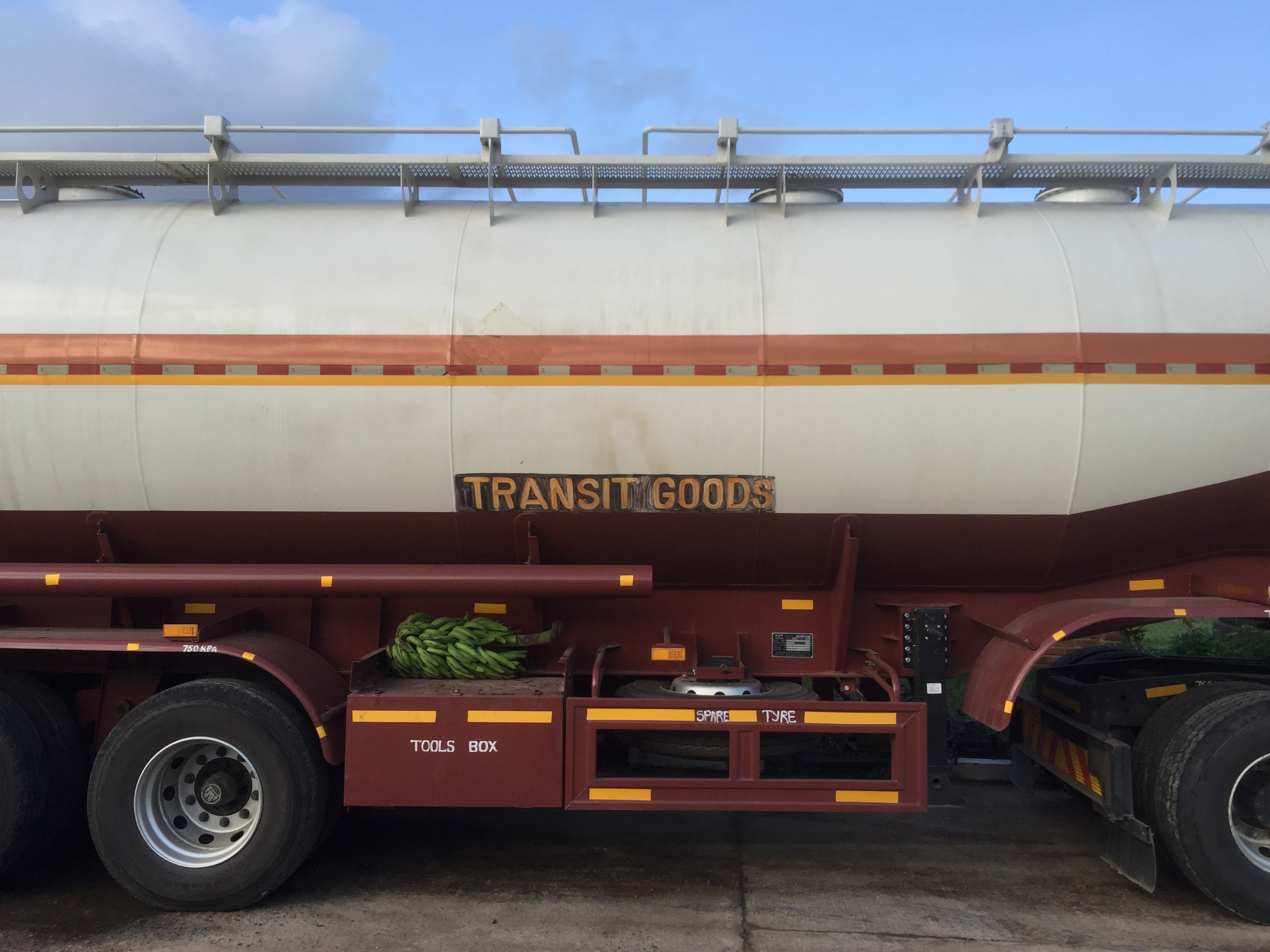
Truck on M1 near Karonga.

Recent (c. 2009) assessments indicate that there were 15,451 km (9,601 mi) of roads in the country; of these, 6,956 km (4,322 mi) (45 percent) were paved. The remaining 8,496 km (5,279 mi) were not paved.

== Ports, harbours and waterways ==
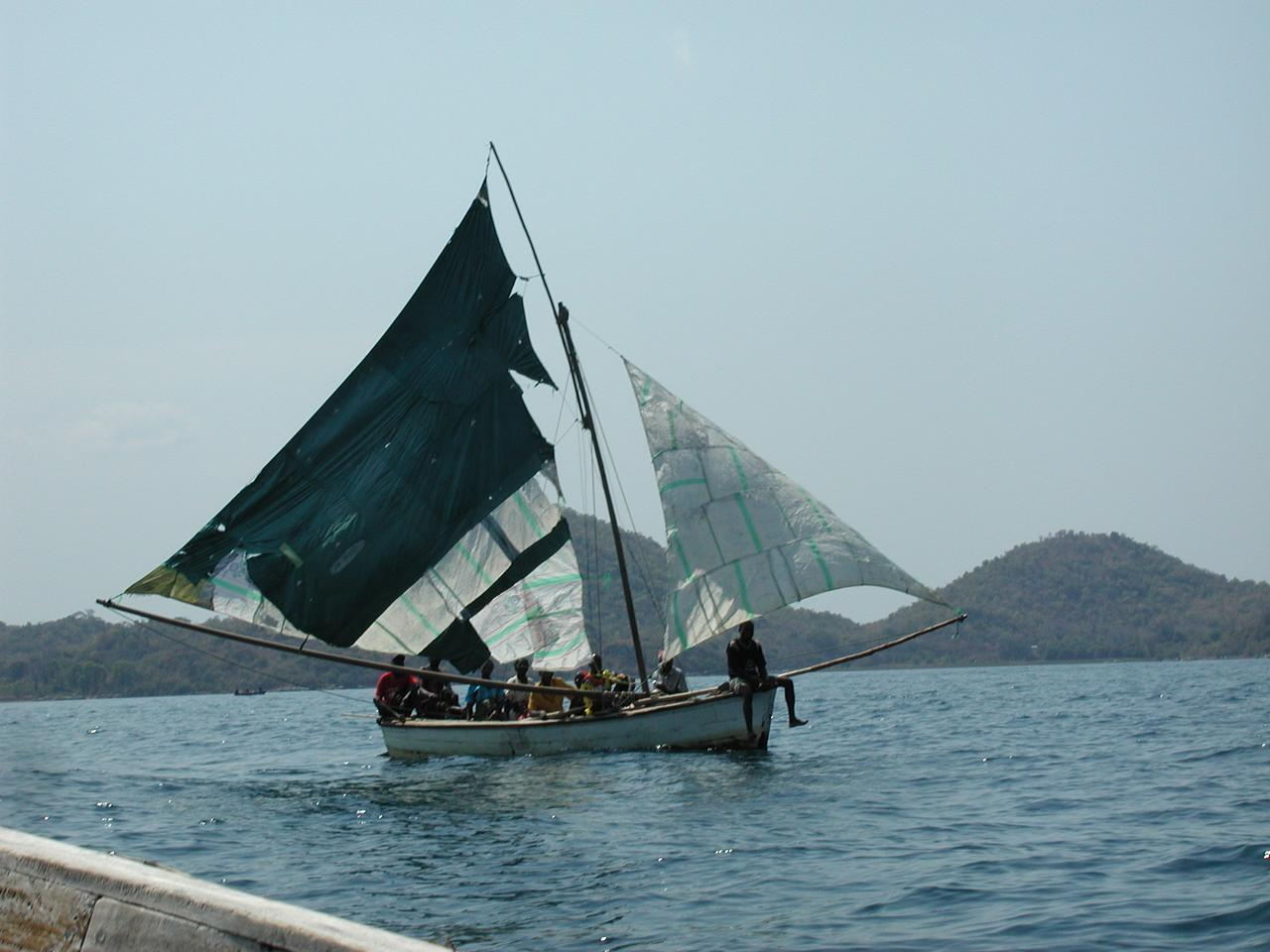
Boat on Lake Malawi

Lake Nyasa (Lake Malawi) and Shire River (144 kilometres) provide the major waterways. There is a railhead at the port of Chipoka, Salima district in central Malawi. Smaller ports exist at Monkey Bay, Nkhata Bay, Nkhotakota and Chilumba.

The MV Ilala connects Likoma Island with the mainland, as well as the Malawian and Mozambican sides of the lake. In 2010, a port in Nsanje was opened to connect the country through the Shire and Zambezi rivers with the Indian Ocean. As of 2015, the port is not operational due to unresolved contracts with Mozambique.

== Air transport ==
Malawian Airlines Limited is the national airline of Malawi which operates regional passenger service. Based in Lilongwe, it is 51% owned by the Malawi government. 49% are controlled by Ethiopian Airlines The airline's main base of operations is Lilongwe International Airport, with a secondary hub at Chileka International Airport.

=== Airports ===
In 2001, there was a total of 44 airports in the country. As of 2015, two airports have scheduled passenger services.

=== Paved runways ===
total: 6
over 3,047 m: 1
1,524 to 2,437 m:1
914 to 1,523 m: 4 (2002)

=== Unpaved runways ===
total: 37
1,524 to 2,437 m: 1
914 to 1,523 m: 14
under 914 m: 22 (2002)

== Rail transport ==
Malawi Railways is the national rail network in Malawi, run by a government corporation until privatisation in 1999. As of 1 December 1999 the Central East African Railways, a consortium led by Railroad Development Corporation, won the right to operate the network. This was the first rail privatisation in Africa which did not involve a parastatal operator.

The rail network totalled 797 kilometres in 2001. It is a narrow gauge line with a 1,067 mm (3 ft 6 in) track.

=== Railway links with adjacent countries ===
The 797-kilometre (495 mi), 1,067 mm (3 ft 6 in) gauge line extends from the Zambian border at Mchinji in the west via Lilongwe to Blantyre and Makhanga in the south. At Nkaya Junction it links with the Nacala Corridor line going east via Nayuchi to Mozambique's deepwater port at Nacala on the Indian Ocean. The link south from Makhanga to Mozambique's Beira corridor has been closed since the Mozambique Civil War, with plans for reconstruction not yet realised.

There is no direct link with neighbouring Tanzania as there is a break of gauge, 1,067 mm (3 ft 6 in)/1,000 mm (3 ft 3 3/8 in) . An extension from Mchinji to Chipata in Zambia opened in 2010, and there is a proposal to eventually link up from there with the TAZARA railway at Mpika. Direct linkage is available with Mozambique, however, which has the same gauge track. Linkage is called the Nacala Corridor line via Nayuchi to the port of Nacala, and Nsanje to the Dona Ana Bridge and Beira. The latter link has not been operational since the war in Mozambique and is in need of reconstruction.

=== Rail developments in 2006 ===
In 2006, a Brazilian company (VALE) announced plans to build a rail branch line to the Moatize coal mine in western Mozambique from the Nacala Corridor line to export coal via the port of Nacala; the link would cross Malawi. The national Railroad Development Corporation map shows a proposed extension across the border to Chipata in Zambia. Central East African Railways, previously a subsidiary of the Railroad Development Corporation, operates the privatised Malawi Railways network. Also in 2006, the president of Malawi, Bingu wa Mutharika asked his Mozambiquan counterpart, Armando Guebuza, to consider the provision of a new 250 kilometre rail connection from Nsanje - the then-current southern extent of Malawi Railways - to the Indian Ocean port of Chinde, near the mouth of the Zambesi.

== Communications ==
As of 2007, there were 175,200 land line telephones in Malawi, and 1.051 million cell phones, which is approximately 8 cell phones per 100 people. The telephone system overall is described as rudimentary. In the past, Malawi's telecommunications system has been named as some of the poorest in Africa, but conditions are improving, with 130,000 land line telephones being connected between 2000 and 2007. Telephones are much more accessible in urban areas, with less than a quarter of land lines being in rural areas. There were 139,500 Internet users as of 2007, and 3 Internet service providers as of 2002. As of 2001 there were 14 radio stations and 1 TV station.

== See also ==
- M3 road (Malawi)
