= Battle of Goa =

Battle of Goa may refer to:

- The Portuguese conquest of Goa in 1510
- The Battle of Goa (1638) between the Dutch and Portuguese
- The Annexation of Goa by India in 1961
