= Siege of Mozambique (1608) =

- Part of Dutch–Portuguese War
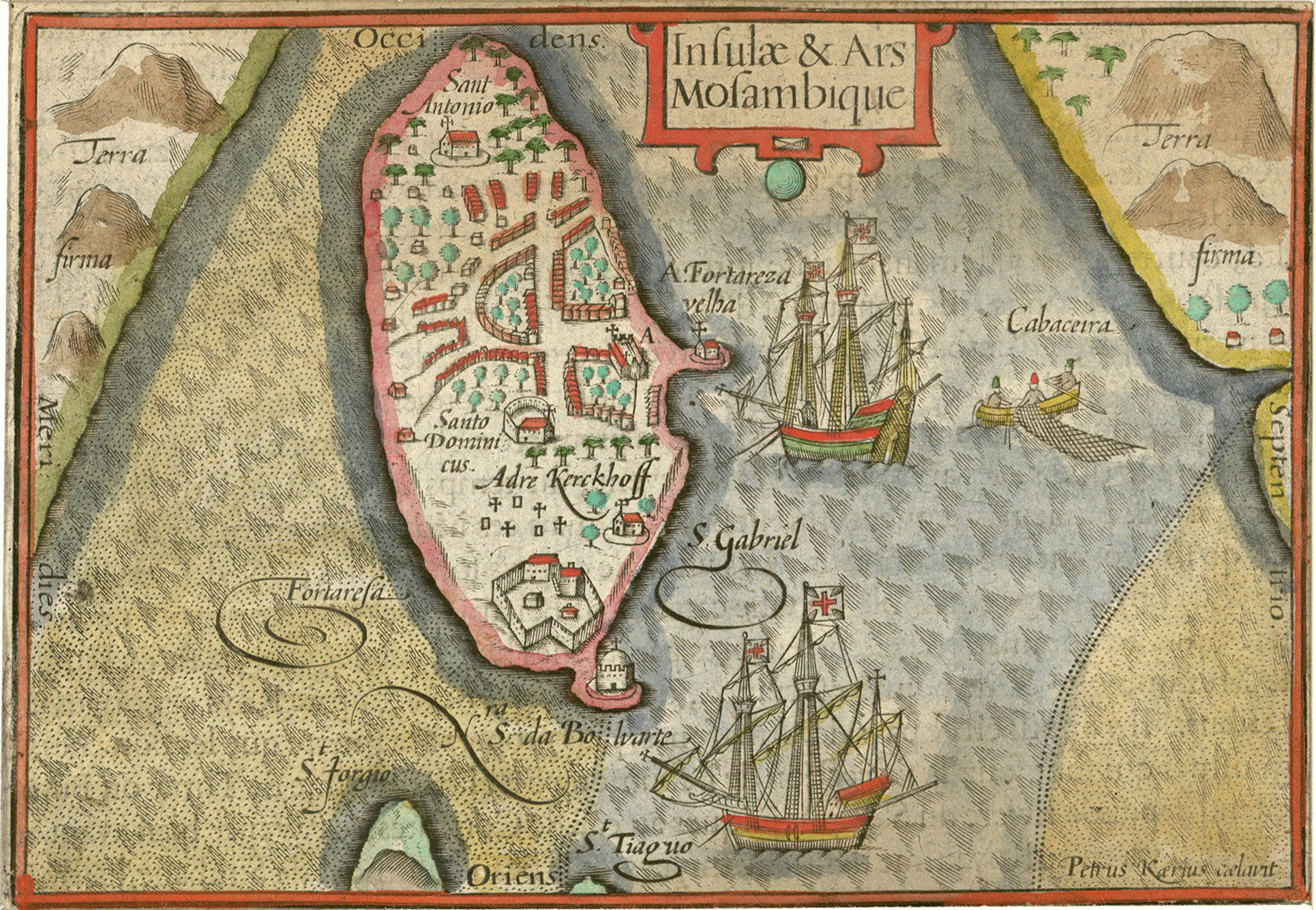
- 1598 Dutch map of Mozambique Island.
Date	July – 18 August 1608.
Location	Island of Mozambique, Mozambique
Result	Portuguese victory

Belligerents
(Kingdom of Portugal) Portuguese Empire	Dutch East India Company

Commanders and leaders
(Kingdom of Portugal) Dom Estêvão de Ataíde	(Dutch East India Company) Pieter Willemsz Verhoeff

Strength
1 carrack, 2 galleons 150 men.	9 fluyts, 4 yachts, 1,840 or 2,000 soldiers.

Casualties and losses
3 ships.	30 dead, 80 wounded.

The siege of Mozambique of 1608 was a second, unsuccessful, attack by the Dutch East India Company on the Portuguese fortress of Mozambique, on the island of Mozambique, in 1608.

== Context ==
The Dutch East India Company or VOC had already attempted to take the Portuguese fort São Sebastião on Island of Mozambique with an armada the previous year, however stubborn Portuguese resistance had forced them to call off the attack.

The attacks were part of the Dutch-Portuguese War, when the Netherlands were committed to contesting Portuguese naval and trade supremacy on the Indian and Pacific Ocean.

Peace negotiations had begun in 1607 between the Habsburg monarchy and the Dutch Republic, hence the directors of the VOC dispatched a number of ships east tasked with capturing as many Portuguese territories as possible before the Twelve Years Truce was signed. The Dutch fleet departed Texel on December 22, 1607, under the command of Pieter Willemsz Verhoeff, with 1840 soldiers, many of which were German mercenaries.

Verhoef sought to revive the VOC offensive against Portuguese holdings in the Orient, starting with Mozambique.

== The siege ==
Verhoeff arrived at Mozambique on July 18, 1608. Unlike what van Caerden had done the year before, Verhoeff avoided anchoring his fleet within the inner harbour, which would have necessitated sailing past the Portuguese forts artillery and instead he remained in the more exposed outer harbour.

The Dutch attempted to capture two Portuguese vessels in the inner harbour, however they came under heavy fire from the fortress and upon bringing them in tow they ran aground and were later burned. Verhoeff landed his soldiers on the island and after occupying the evacuated town, trenches were dug, artillery batteries set and the fort subjected to a bombardment, however the Portuguese resisted eagerly and repaired the walls at night. The height of the walls however made it difficult for the Portuguese to fire their cannon on the assailants. An incident occurred within the fortress in the first day of the siege, where a soldier let a lighted fuse fall on a quantity of gunpowder, igniting it, killing a few men and causing a fire which nearly consumed the storehouses. On the second day a breach was opened on the walls, but the Dutch failed to exploit it. A contemporary Portuguese writer commented that:

as the Dutch are nothing more than good artillerymen and beyond this are of no account except to be burned as desperate heretics, they had not courage to rush through".

19th century chart of Mozambique Island and harbour.

Verhoeff wrote on August 4 to the Portuguese commander Dom Estêvão de Ataíde demanding his surrender, but he replied that he hoped to force him to withdraw as he had done to Van Caerden, and that the fortress was not "the kind of cat to be taken without gloves".

From the tall ramparts the Portuguese had the benefit of being able to observe Dutch movements. On August 15, 25 or 30 Portuguese soldiers and some slaves conducted a sally on Dutch positions, killing 30 captured two flags. Five catholic soldiers deserted to the Portuguese side and Verhoeff demanded that Dom Estevão return the deserters or he'd shoot 34 Portuguese prisoners in his control, but Dom Estevão replied that he would not even if the Portuguese prisoners were "thirty-four thousand"; in response, Verhoeff had all of the prisoners executed in sight of the fortress, according to himself, though the Portuguese recorded only 6 being shot.

Having written to Dom Estêvão demanding the forts surrender but once more been rebuffed, on August 18 Verhoeff reembarked.

On August 17 or 21, four fluyts engaged and captured the Portuguese galleon Bom Jesus, with a crew of 180 men and captained by Francisco Sodré de Pereira, en route from Lisbon to Goa.

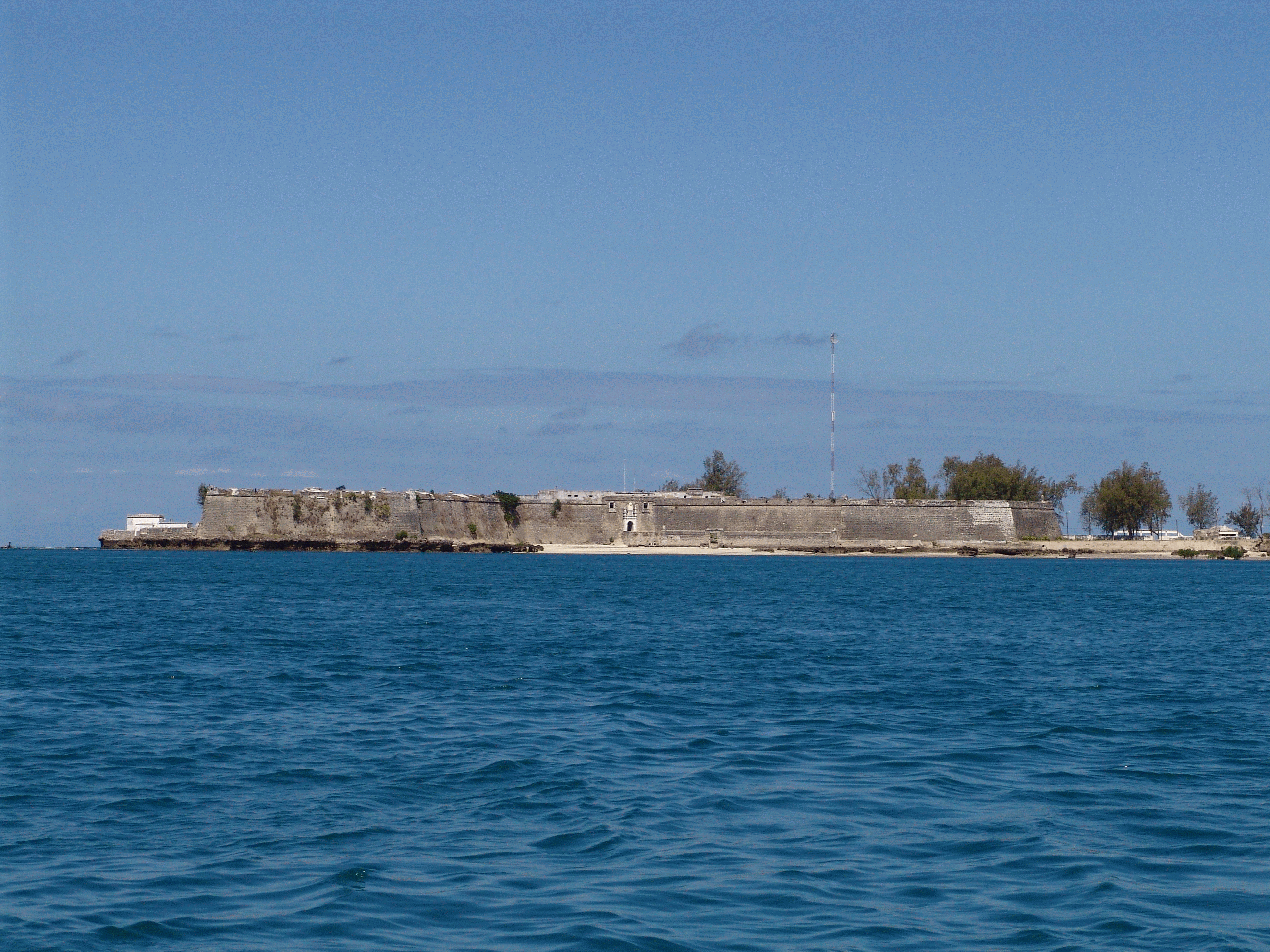
The Portuguese fort São Sebastião on Mozambique Island.

The Dutch sailed to India on August 23.

== Aftermath ==
1250 cannonballs were fired upon the fortress.

When Verhoeff blockaded Goa he failed to capture any rich prizes and was unable to besiege Portuguese Malacca, in Malaysia, the defenses of which had been strengthened, while the Sultan of Johore refused him any military assistance.

The Dutch would attempt to capture Mozambique once again 55 years later.

== See also ==
- Portuguese Mozambique
