= Estêvão de Ataíde =

Portuguese governor of Mozambique (c.1570-1613)

- Captain General and Governor of Mozambique
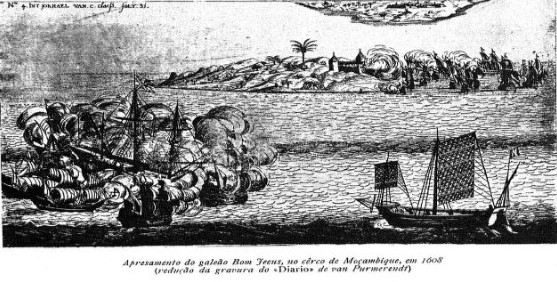
- 17th century Engraving, representing a naval combat between the Portuguese and the Dutch off the Island of Mozambique, when D. Estêvão de Ataíde was governor

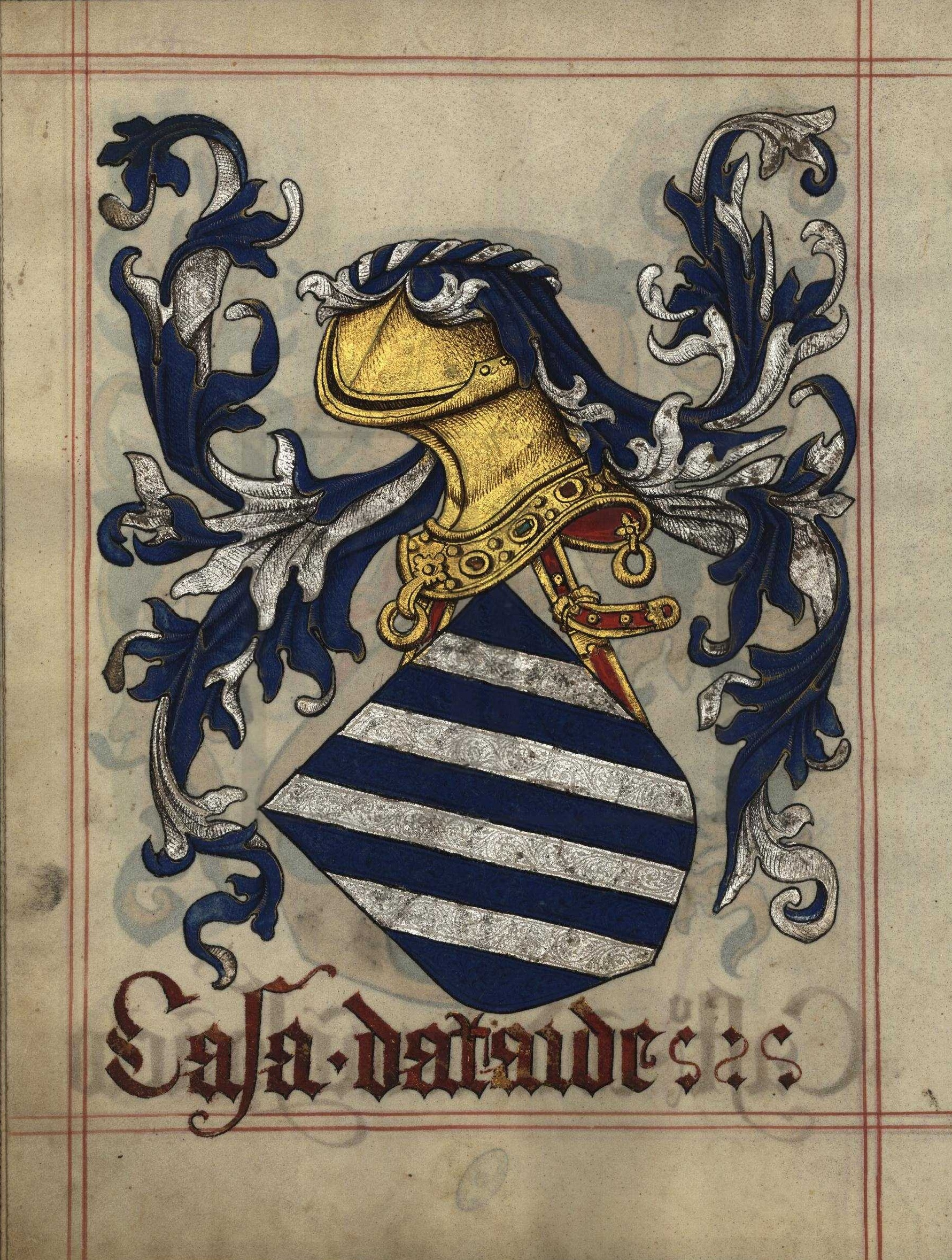
- Coat of arms
- Tenure: 1606-1609 (1st term); 1611-1613 (2nd term)
- Predecessor: Sebastião de Macedo (1st term); Nuno Álvares Pereira (2nd term)
- Successor: Nuno Álvares Pereira (1st term); Diogo Simões de Madeira (2nd term)
- Other titles: Dom
- Known for: Defense of Portuguese Mozambique against Dutch attacks
- Born: c. 1570
- Died: 1613 (aged 42–43); Mozambique
- Cause of death: Tropical disease
- Buried: Chapel of the Jesuits, Island of Mozambique
- Wars and battles: Siege of Mozambique (1607); Siege of Mozambique (1608)
- Noble family: Ataíde
- Spouse: D. Mariana de Noronha
- Father: D. Álvaro de Ataíde, captain and governor of the Maluku Islands
- Mother: D. Jerónima de Castro do Canto
- Occupation: Military

Dom Estêvão de Ataíde (c. 1570 - 1613) was a Portuguese soldier, twice governor of Mozambique, who distinguished himself for having successfully defended the Island of Mozambique and its fortress from attacks and sieges by the Dutch, between 1607 and 1608. According to the British historian Edgar Prestage, this defense "saved, not only the fortress itself, but Portuguese rule in the East including East Africa".

D. Estêvão de Ataíde was described by his contemporary, the French navigator and explorer François Pyrard de Laval, as a "courageous and gallant Lord".

== Biography ==
He was the son of Dom Álvaro de Ataíde, captain and governor of the Maluku islands between 1567 and 1560, by his wife D. Jerónima de Castro do Canto. He was thus a great-grandson, in the paternal line, of another Dom Álvaro de Ataíde, Lord of Castanheira (second-born son of the 1st Count of Atouguia), a participant in the conspiracy of the Duke of Viseu against King John II of Portugal.

The exact date of his birth is unknown, but considering that his maternal grandparents married in 1544, it was likely around 1570.

His appointment to the position of captain general of Mozambique was made in the context of the threat of an upcoming Dutch attack, which had already been foreseen and which greatly worried the court of the Iberian Union.

In fact, in a letter dated January 18, 1607, addressed to the viceroy of India, D. Martim Afonso de Castro, King Philip II of Portugal wrote that, if the Dutch managed to occupy the fortress of Mozambique, "it would be a total impediment for the navigation of my armadas to these parts, as it is common for them to go there, both coming and going, and it is often necessary for them to winter there, in addition to the great wealth of these provinces, which with the said fortress are sustained and defended."

Thus, in 1607 and 1608, D. Estêvão de Ataíde led a tenacious defense of the Portuguese forces against the attacks of the Dutch, who would end up giving up their attempts to occupy the island in 1608, finally lifting the siege and leaving towards the Sunda Islands. This Portuguese military feat would be celebrated later, in a work published in Madrid, in 1633 (but written before 1611), by an eyewitness to the fighting, the Portuguese soldier António Durão.

The book, written in Spanish, with the title "Sieges of Mozambique, defended by Dom Estevão de Atayde captain-general, and governor of that fortress", provides a detailed description, in a narrative and factual style, of the military operations in defense of the Island of Mozambique. The author states that he wrote his text while inside the Fort of São Sebastião on the Island of Mozambique. From a letter that Durão addressed to the son of D. Estêvão de Ataíde, published in the first pages of the book, it appears that the manuscript was sent to the governor himself in March 1611, although the final publication only came out 22 years later.

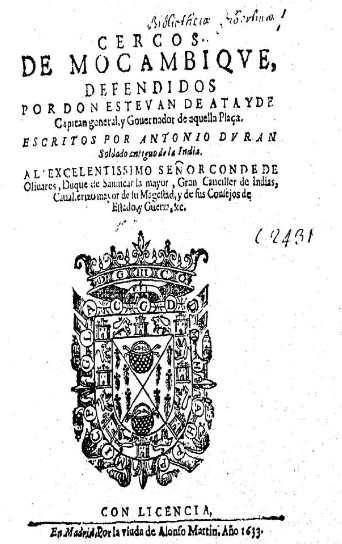
Frontispiece of the book by the Portuguese soldier António Durão, Sieges of Mozambique defended by Dom Estêvão de Ataíde, published in Madrid, in Spanish, in 1633

Dom Estêvão de Ataíde showed great qualities of command, and personal courage, between 1607 and 1609. However, when - soon after the lifting of the Dutch siege - he was appointed in July 1609 (by the viceroy of Portuguese India, Rui Lourenço de Távora) to the position and title of Conqueror of the Mines of Monomotapa, events would start to unfold in many ways unfavorable to him.

He revealed some lack of political and diplomatic tact, when he refused to continue sending the tribute to the Kingdom of Mutapa, which Portuguese captains traditionally paid, in order to trade in these lands. This resulted in a situation of military conflict between the Portuguese and the armies of the King of Monomotapa (Mutapa) and, in the end, Ataíde was unable to discover the gold and silver mines that, since Francisco Barreto's unsuccessful expedition in 1569, the Portuguese crown persisted in trying to reach.

In 1611, Dom Estêvão had meanwhile been appointed for a second term as captain general and governor of Mozambique.

However, in May 1612, the King of Portugal, dissatisfied with Ataíde's performance after 1609, wrote to the new viceroy of Portuguese India, Dom Jerónimo de Azevedo, giving instructions to annul the contract made between Rui Lourenço de Távora and D. Estêvão to conquer the Monomotapa mines, and also ordering Ataíde to go to Goa and for his administration to be investigated.

Shortly afterwards, in 1613, Philip II of Portugal raised the level of his condemnation of Ataíde's second term, and ordered that D. Estêvão be sent instead to Lisbon under arrest and that his assets should be confiscated.

But D. Estêvão died that same year, a victim of tropical fevers. Death thus saved him from having to serve the royal sentence - and his rich estate was used to pay for repairs to the Fort of São Sebastião, which he had defended so well twice, in 1607 and 1608.

Estêvão de Ataíde is buried in the Church of the Jesuits (also known by the name of Chapel of Saint Francis Xavier) on the Island of Mozambique.

Diogo Simões de Madeira succeeded him, but only as interim governor; later, in 1613, a new governor was formally appointed - his relative (he was, like D. Estêvão, a descendant of the 1st Count of Atouguia), Dom João de Azevedo, brother of the Viceroy of India, the aforementioned Jerónimo de Azevedo.

== Marriage and children ==
He married D. Mariana de Noronha, daughter of Dom Afonso de Noronha and Joana de Miranda, and from this marriage a son and a daughter were born:

- D. Álvaro de Ataíde, capitão-mor of Elvas and 2nd Administrator of the majorat established by his maternal grandmother, Dona Jerónima de Castro do Canto. He did not marry, nor did he leave any known issue.
- D. Ana de Noronha, who married Jorge de Albuquerque in Lisbon (Loreto Parish), on 18 December 1627, with no issue.
