= Dutch–Portuguese War =

Conflict for sea dominance (1598–1663)

- Part of the Eighty Years' War
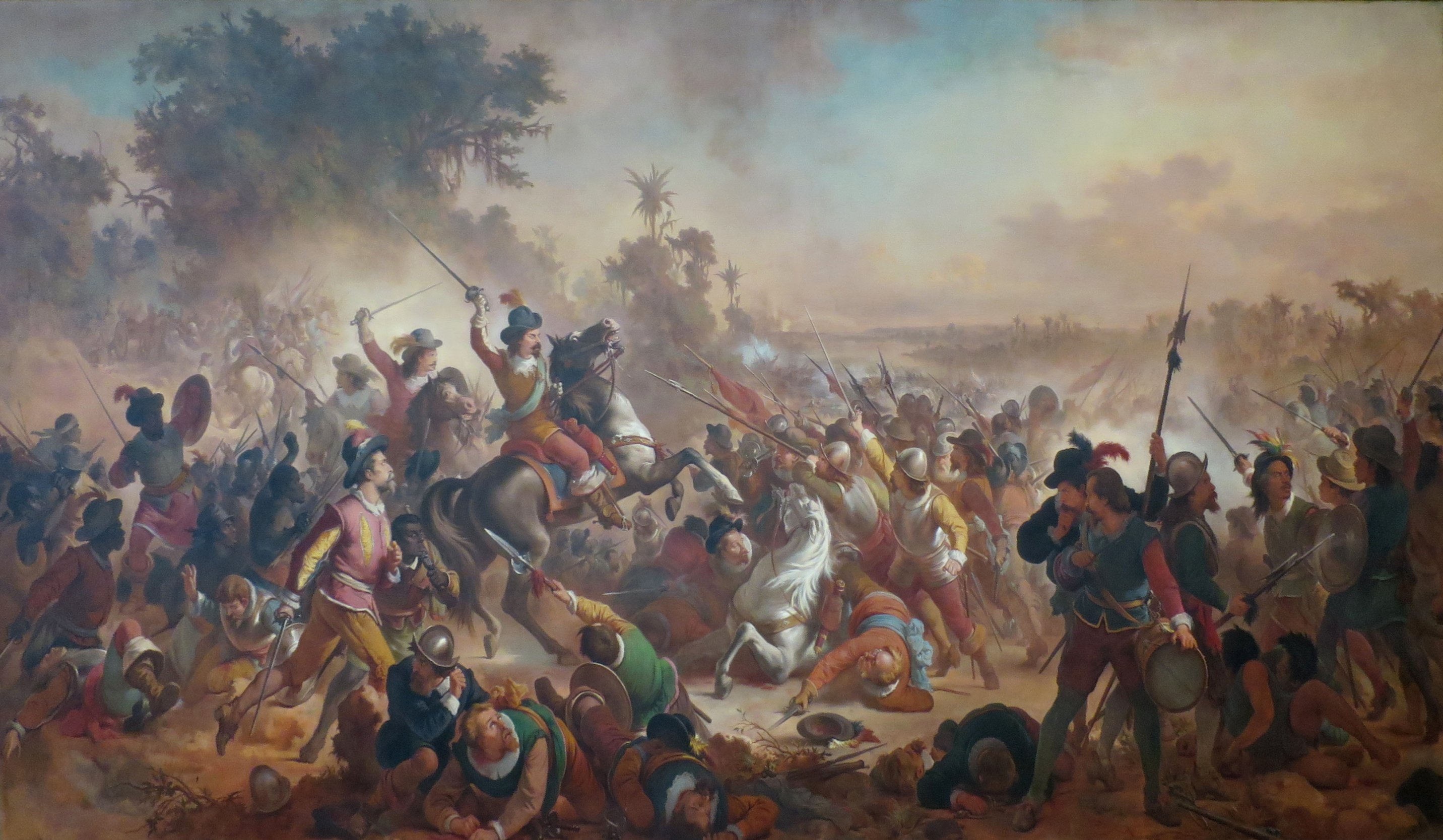
- Battle of Guararapes
Date	1598–1663
Location	Iberia; South America; West Africa; Angola; East Africa; Persian Gulf; India; Sri Lanka; South-East Asia; China
Result	Treaty of The Hague

Belligerents
Portugal	Dutch Republic: Dutch East India Company; Dutch West India Company

Commanders and leaders
Matias de Albuquerque; Salvador de Sá	(Dutch West India Company) John Maurice of Nassau; (Dutch East India Company) Rijckloff van Goens

The Dutch–Portuguese War was a global armed conflict involving Dutch forces, in the form of the Dutch East India Company (VOC), the Dutch West India Company (GWC), and their allies, against the Iberian Union, and after 1640, the Portuguese Empire. Beginning in 1598, the conflict primarily involved the Dutch companies and fleet invading Portuguese colonies in the Americas, Africa, and the East Indies.

The war can be thought of as an extension of the Eighty Years' War being fought in Europe at the time between Spain and the Netherlands, as Portugal was in a dynastic union with Spain after the War of the Portuguese Succession, for most of the conflict. However, the conflict had little to do with the war in Europe and served mainly as a way for the Dutch to gain an overseas empire and control trade at the cost of the Portuguese. Because of the commodity at the center of the conflict, this war would be nicknamed the Spice War.

Portugal repelled Dutch attempts to secure Brazil, Angola, and Mozambique, but the Dutch disrupted the Portuguese trading networks in Asia, where they captured the Malabar Coast, Ceylon, Malacca, and the Moluccas. In Africa, the Dutch conquered the Gold Coast, Arguin, and Goreé.

Portuguese resentment of Spain, which was perceived as having prioritized its own colonies and neglected the defense of the Portuguese, the weaker member of the union, was a major contributing factor to Portugal shaking off Spanish rule in the Portuguese Restoration War. Moreover, the Portuguese claimed that the Iberian Union was a reason for the attacks on their colonies by the Dutch.

== Introduction ==
The war lasted from 1598 to 1663, and the main participants were the Kingdom of Portugal and the Dutch Republic.

Following the 1580 Iberian Union, Portugal was under Habsburg rule for most of this period, and the Habsburg Philip II of Spain was battling the Dutch Revolt. Prior to the union of the Portuguese and Spanish Crowns, Portuguese merchants used the Low Countries as a base for the sale of their spices in Northern Europe. After the Spaniards gained control of the Portuguese Empire, they declared an embargo on all trade with the rebellious provinces (see Union of Utrecht). In his efforts to subdue the rebelling provinces, Philip II cut off the Netherlands from the spice markets of Lisbon, making it necessary for the Dutch to send their own expeditions to the sources of these commodities and to take control of the Indies spice trade. This followed the capture of Recife in which the Dutch assisted the English in capturing the Portuguese colony.

Like the French and English, the Dutch worked to create a global trade network at the expense of the Iberian kingdoms. The Dutch Empire attacked many territories in Asia under the rule of the Portuguese and Spanish including Formosa, Ceylon, the Philippines, and commercial interests in Japan, Africa (Mina), and South America.

== Background ==
In 1592, during the war with Spain, an English fleet had captured a large Portuguese galleon off the Azores, the Madre de Deus, loaded with 900 tons of merchandise from India and China, worth an estimated half a million pounds (nearly half the size of English treasury at the time). This foretaste of the riches of the East galvanized interest in the region. That same year, Dutch merchants sent Cornelis de Houtman to Lisbon, to gather as much information as he could about the Spice Islands. In 1595, merchant and explorer Jan Huyghen van Linschoten, having traveled widely in the Indian Ocean in the service of the Portuguese, published a travel report in Amsterdam, the "Reys-gheschrift vande navigatien der Portugaloysers in Orienten" ("Report of a journey through the navigations of the Portuguese in the East"). The published report included vast directions on how to navigate ships between Portugal and the East Indies and to Japan. Dutch and British interest fed by new information led to a movement of commercial expansion, and the foundation of the English East India Company in 1600, and Dutch East India Company (Verenigde Oostindische Compagnie or VOC) in 1602, allowing the entry of chartered companies in the so-called East Indies.

In 1602, the VOC was founded, with the goal of sharing the costs of the exploration of the East Indies and ultimately re-establishing the spice trade, which generated high profits in the new Dutch Republic and other European countries if the spices were bought at source and their supply could be controlled by a monopoly.

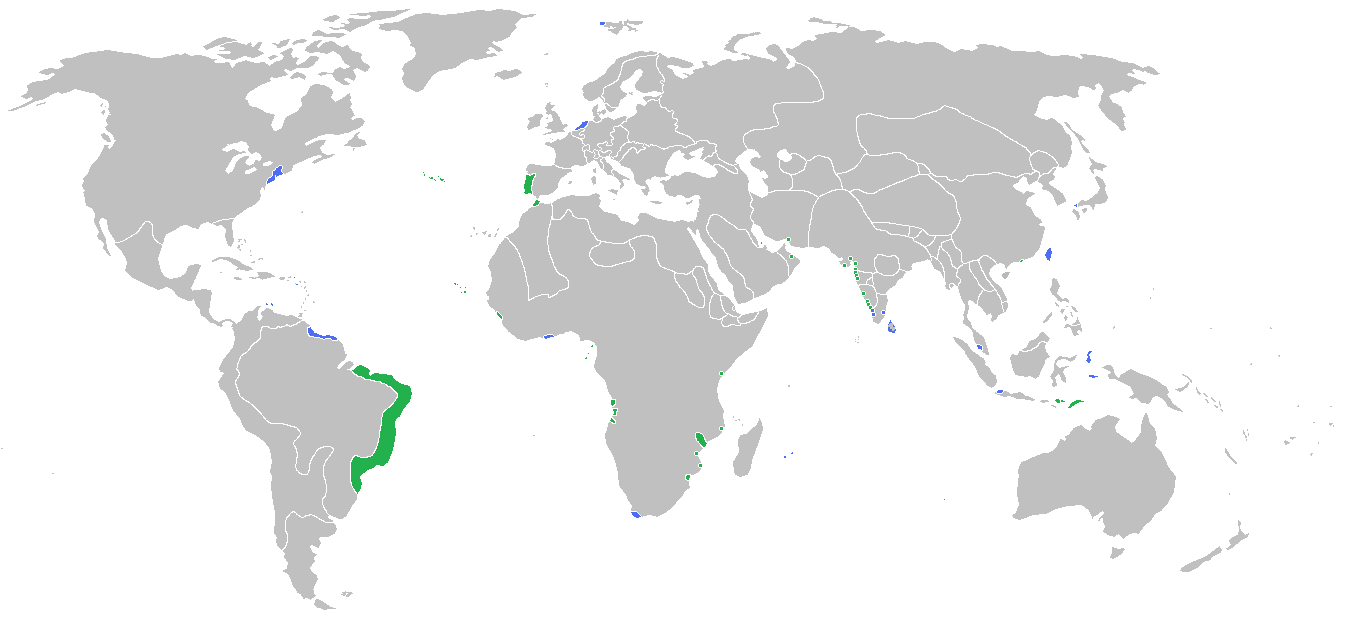
Map of the Dutch and Portuguese Empires following the war. Blue: Dutch Republic. Green: Portugal.

The need of founding the VOC arose because, with the war with Spain and Portugal being united to Spain, the trade would now be directed through the southern Low Countries (roughly present-day Belgium), which according to the Union of Arras (or Union of Atrecht) were pledged to the Spanish monarch and were Catholic, as opposed to the Dutch Protestant north. This also meant that the Dutch had lost their most profitable trade partner and their most important source of financing the war against Spain. Additionally, the Dutch would lose their distribution monopoly with France, the Holy Roman Empire, and Northern Europe.

The Portuguese Empire in the Indian Ocean was a traditional thalassocracy that had extended its reach to every major choke point in the ocean. Trade in the area corresponded also to a traditional triangular model whereupon small manufactures would be brought from Europe and traded in Africa for gold and several items, then these would serve to purchase spices in India proper which were then brought back to Europe and traded at immense profit which would be reinvested into ships and troops, to be sent eastwards.

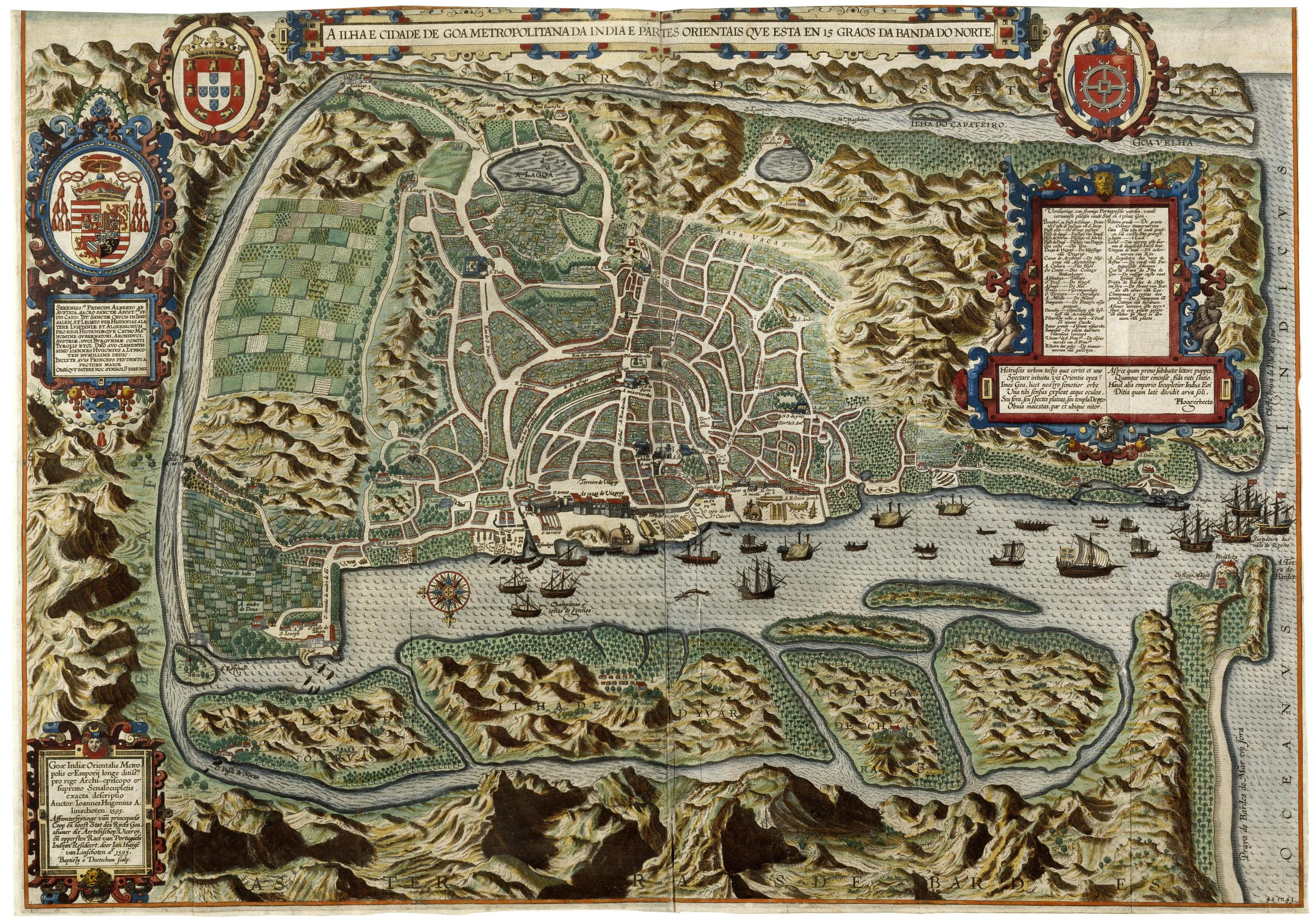
Portuguese Goa in the late 16th century.

The Portuguese State of India, headquartered in Goa, was a network of key cities which controlled the maritime trade in the Indian Ocean: Sofala was the base for Portuguese operations in East Africa and was supported by Kilwa to better control the Mozambique Channel; from here, the routes took the trade to Goa which was the hub for the rest of the operations and where the India convoy ships out of Europe arrived; from Goa, going northwards, the trade would be protected by the North and Adventurers Fleets all the way to Daman and Diu which oversaw the northern trade and the Gulf of Cambay; while the Fleet of the North escorted merchant ships the Adventurers Fleet would also seek to disrupt the Mecca trade between northern India's Muslims and the Arabian Peninsula; the Diu fleet would then connect the trade to Hormuz which controlled the Persian Gulf routes and interrupted the Basra-Suez trade; southwards from Goa, the Cape Comorin fleet would escort the Goa merchants to Calicut and Cochin on the Malabar Coast and to Ceylon and the connection to the Bay of Bengal; in the Bay of Bengal, the most lucrative trade was on the Coromandel Coast where such settlements as São Tomé of Mylapore and Pulicat served as hubs; it was in the Coromandel and Ceylon settlements where the ships out of the Malacca route often laid anchor because they connected the Indian Ocean to the South China Sea; the Malacca fleet patrolled the Singapore Strait and the routes diverted to Celebes and what is now Indonesia at large in the south, and northwards to China and Japan; China provided silk and china to Macau from where the "Silver Carrack" connected to Japan where several products were exchanged for Japanese silver.

=== Casus belli ===
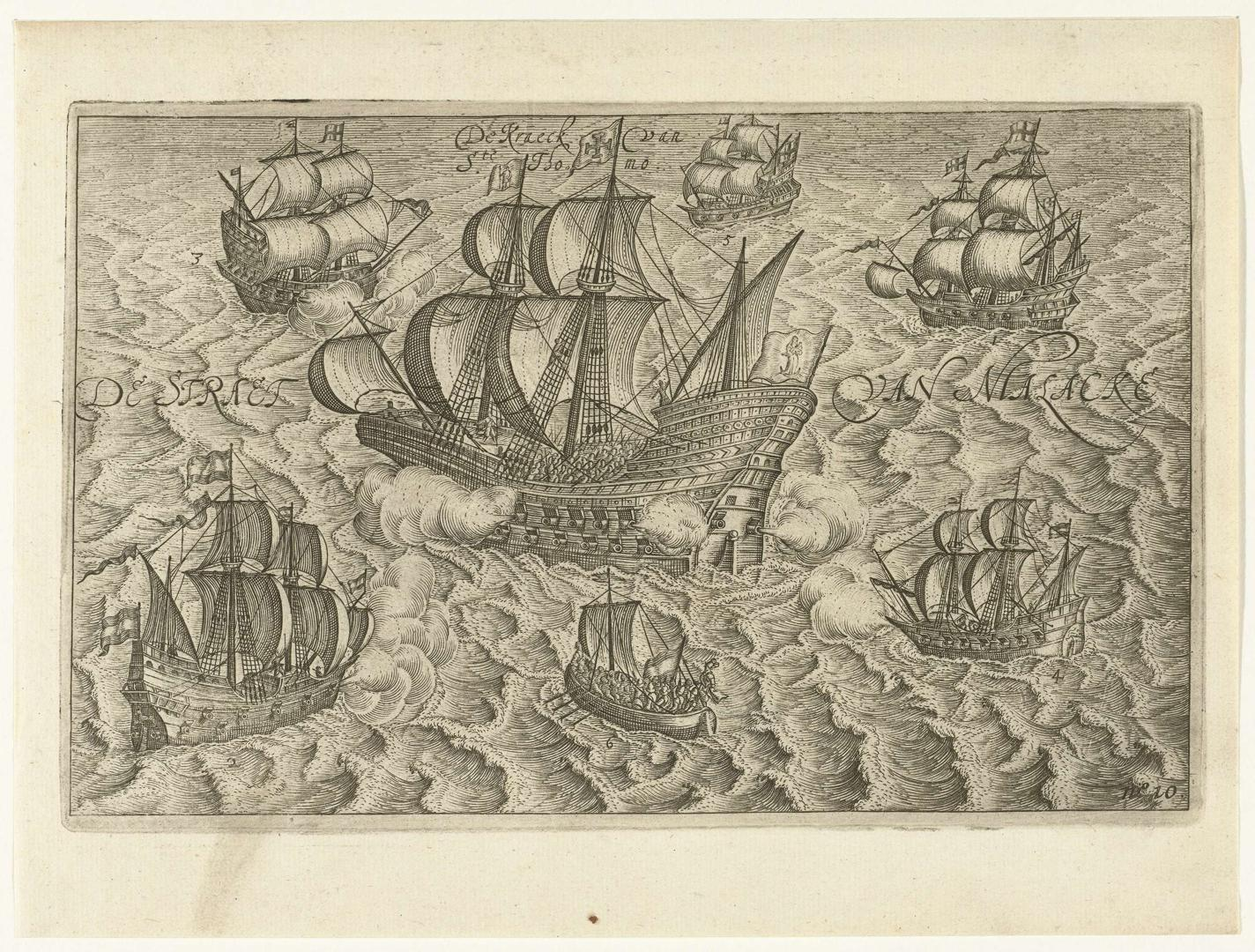
English and Dutch seizure of a Portuguese carrack St. Thomé traveling from St. Thomé (India) to Malacca (Malaysia) in October 1602.

At dawn on 25 February 1603, three ships of the VOC seized the Santa Catarina, a Portuguese galleon. It was such a rich prize that its sale proceeds doubled the capital of the VOC. The legality of keeping the prize was questionable under Dutch statute and the Portuguese demanded the return of their cargo. The scandal led to a public judicial hearing and a wider campaign to sway public (and international) opinion. As a result, Hugo Grotius in The Free Sea (Mare Liberum, published 1609) formulated the new principle that the sea was international territory, against the Portuguese mare clausum policy, and all nations were free to use it for seafaring trade. The "free seas" provided suitable ideological justification for the Dutch to break the Portuguese monopoly through its formidable naval power.

== Incursion into the East Indies: Batavia challenges Goa ==
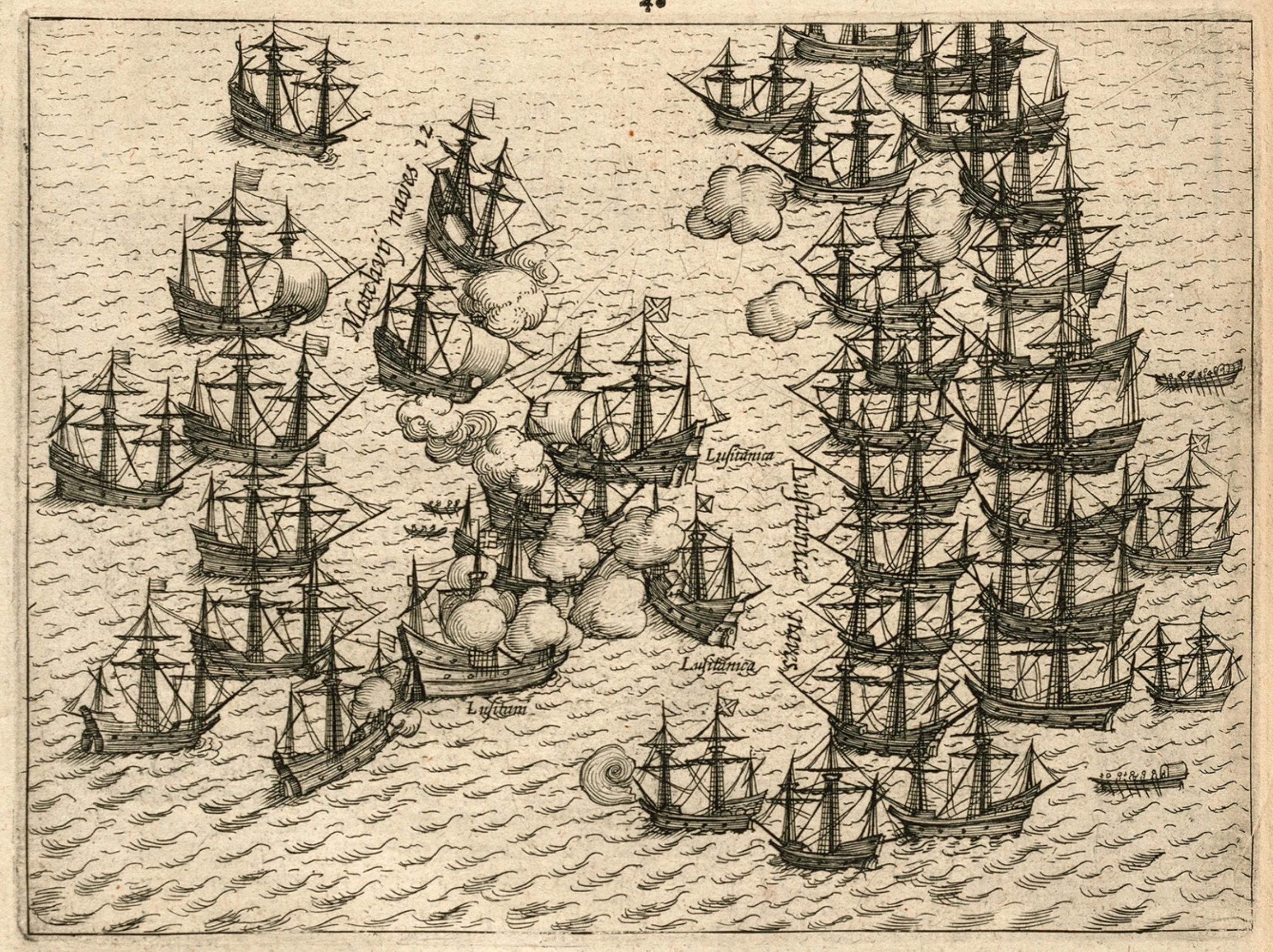
Battle for Malacca between the VOC fleet and the Portuguese, 1606.

The Portuguese relied on four strategic bases in the East Indies: Goa, Hormuz, Malacca, and Macau. The first served as the seat of Portuguese viceroys, head of all Portuguese possessions east of the Cape of Good Hope and connected India with Portugal proper; Hormuz was a Portuguese protectorate, and the keystone of the Persian Gulf trade between Persia, Arabia, Mesopotamia, and the rest of Asia and Africa. Malacca connected Goa to the Indian Ocean trade via Cape Comorin and Ceylon; and Macau was the hub for the trade routes stretching from the South China Sea to the Sea of Japan and to the Spice Islands, east of New Guinea in Melanesia. The other locations were important but not crucial: including Diu along with Bombay (until the English acquisition). These Indian cities controlled the approaches to the smaller Gulf of Cambay and to the larger Arabian Sea as well.

If both Diu and Hormuz would fall, that would prevent the West Asian markets from being taxed by Portugal, which would deny Lisbon the revenue from the southernmost course of the silk route. It was a lucrative trade but not as essential to the Indian Ocean spice trade network at large.

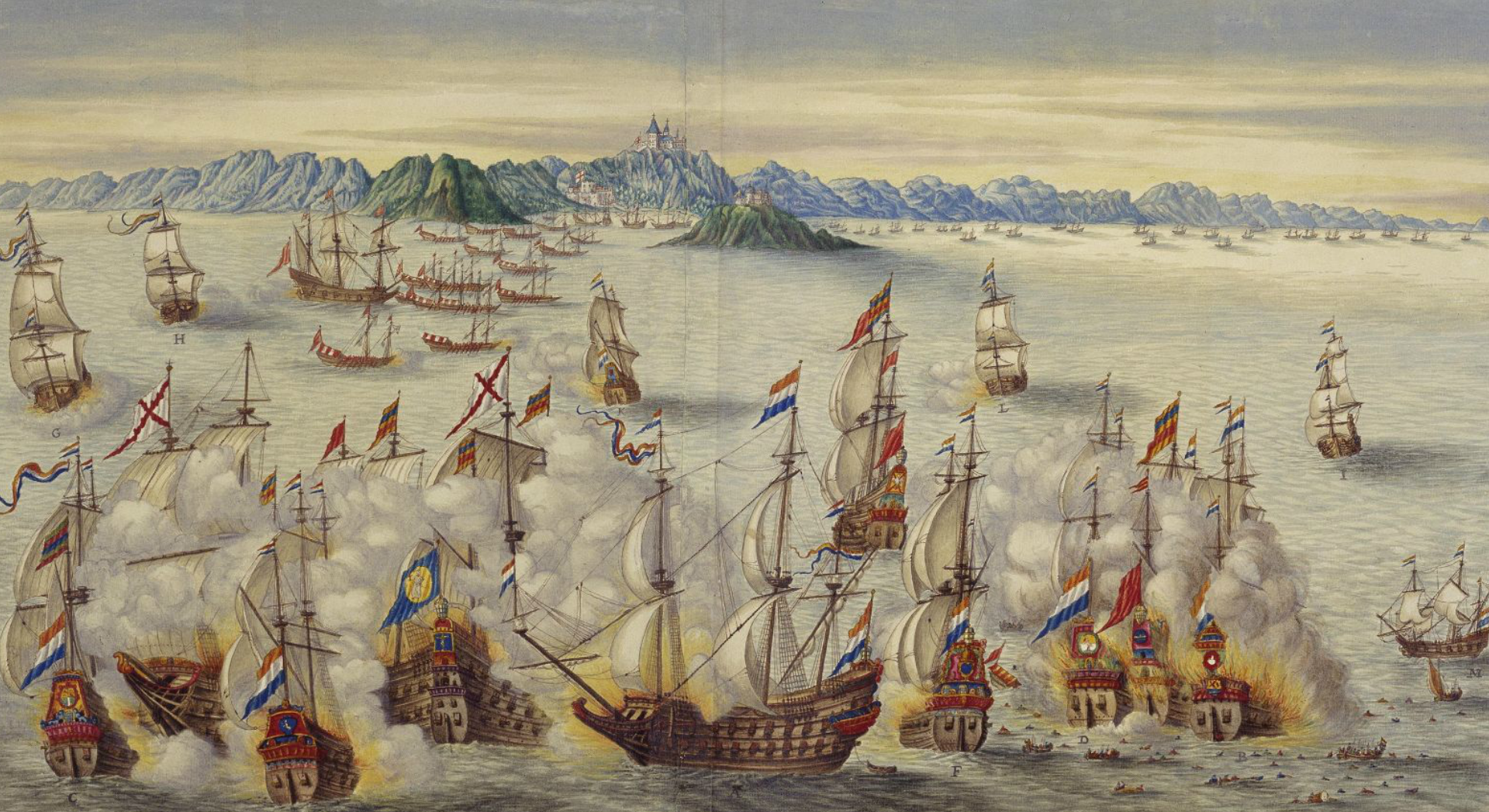
Sea battle off Goa between the Dutch and Portuguese fleets in 1638

However, the VOC suffered from the same weakness as Portugal: lack of manpower. Thus, a Spanish-style colonization effort was never feasible and only dominion of the seas would allow it to compete. The Portuguese had a century head start in the region and their empire allowed them access to converted and loyal local populations, which shored up inland, what naval power could not ensure at sea. Hence, the Dutch directed their efforts to the periphery of the Portuguese Empire. Avoiding the Indian coasts, they set up their own headquarters in Southeast Asia, in the city of Batavia (modern-day Jakarta). This put them safely distant from Goa but opportunistically close to Malacca and the sea lanes connecting the Pacific and Indian Oceans. Many battles were fought but the most decisive ones fatally injured the Portuguese Indian empire. The Dutch blockade of Goa between 1604 and 1645 deprived Portuguese India from a safe connection to Lisbon – and Europe – for the remainder of the war.

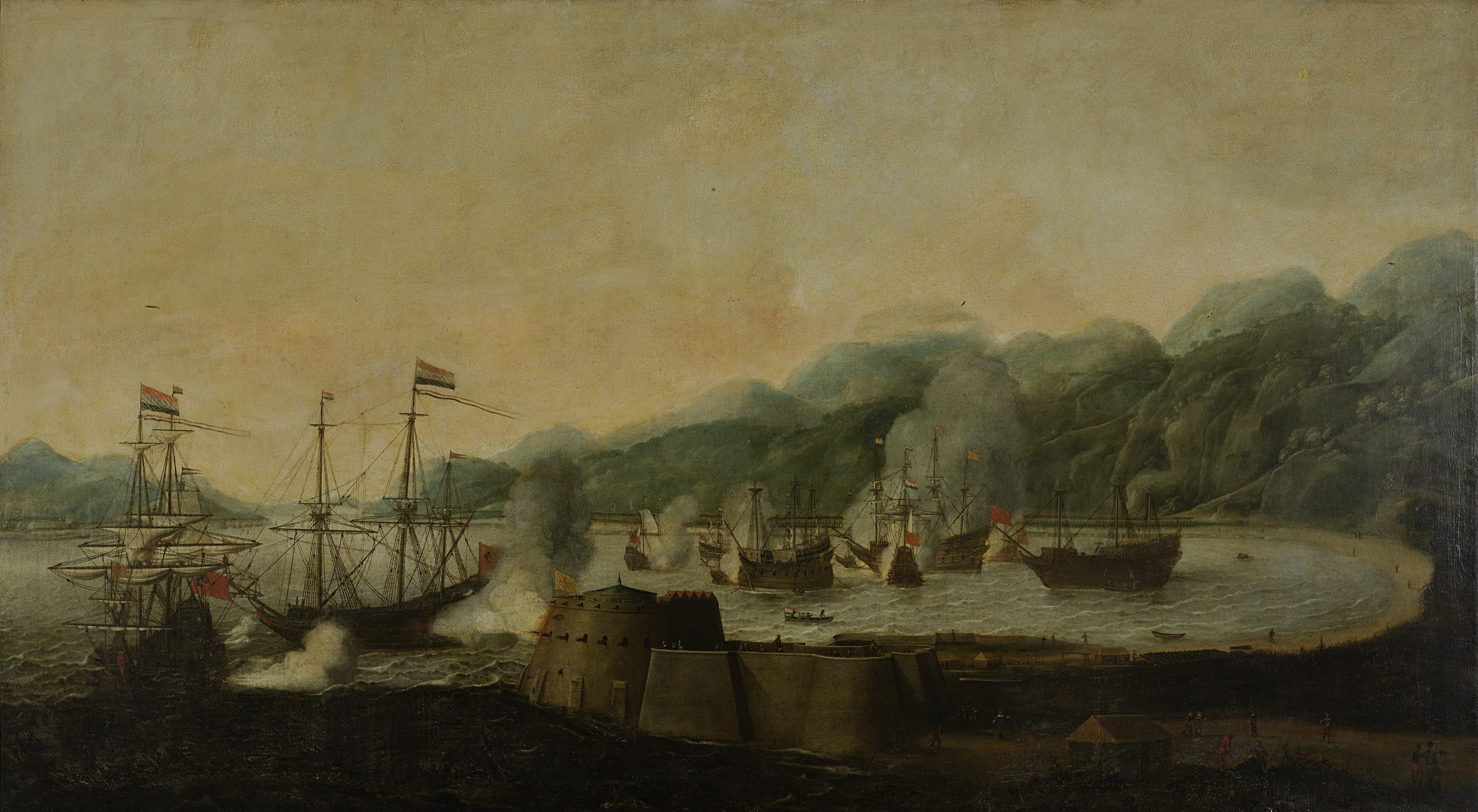
The blockade of Goa

In 1615, a battle off the coast of Malacca destroyed Portuguese naval power in Southeast Asia. The Portuguese lost their naval supremacy to the Dutch in the crucial route between Goa and Macau. The sieges of Qeshm and Hormuz by the combined forces of Persia and England have largely dislodged the Portuguese from West Asia. The 1639 expulsion of the Jesuits (sakoku) and subsequently the Portuguese, from Nagasaki, also doomed the economic viability of Macau. The siege of Malacca of 1641, after many attempts, delivered the city to the Dutch and their regional allies (including the Sultanate of Johor), crucially breaking the spinal cord between Goa and the Orient.

Portuguese establishments were isolated and prone to being picked off one by one, but nevertheless the Dutch only enjoyed mixed success in doing so. Amboina was captured from the Portuguese in 1605, but an attack on Malacca, the Battle of Cape Rachado, the following year narrowly failed in its objective to provide a more strategically located base in the East Indies with favorable monsoon winds. In 1607 and 1608, the Dutch twice failed to subdue the Portuguese stronghold on the Island of Mozambique, due to the close cooperation between the locals and the Portuguese.

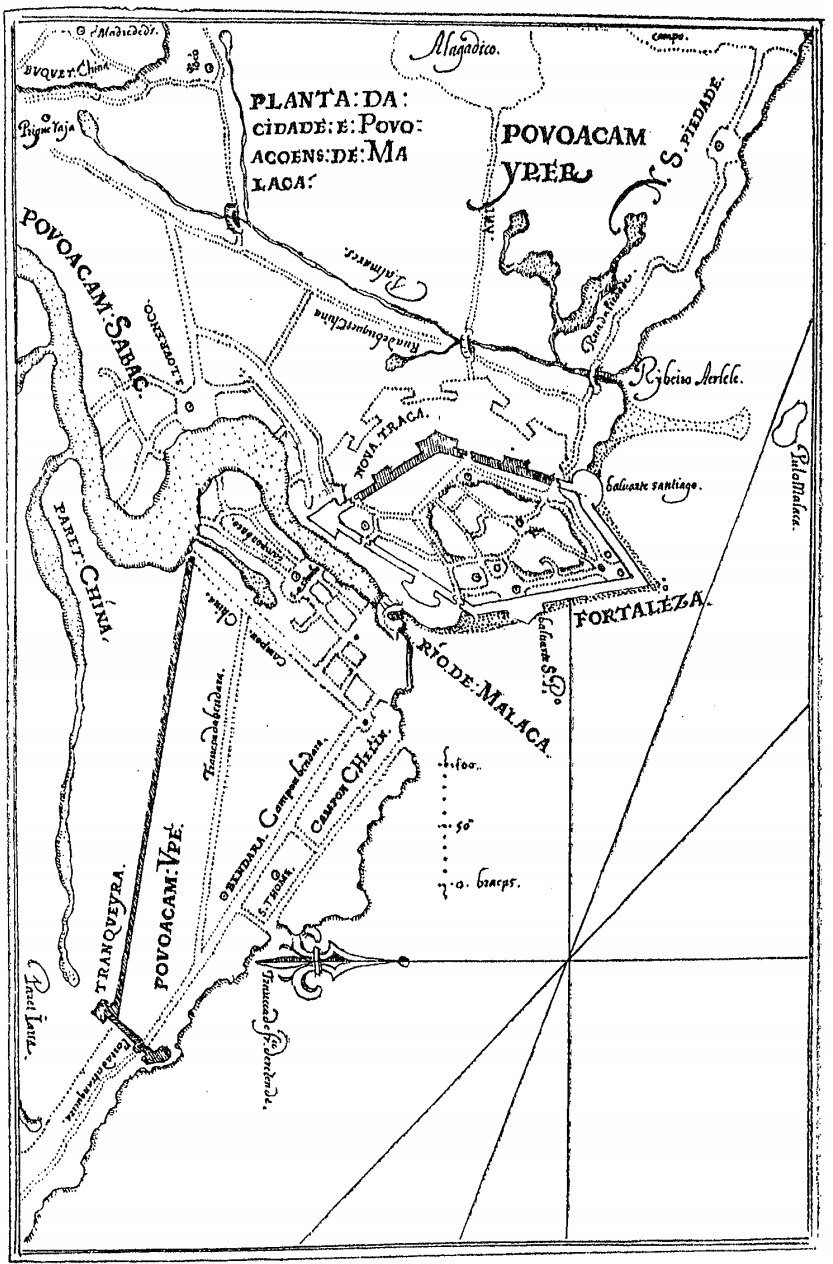
The strategic Portuguese fortress of Malacca, in Malaysia.

The Dutch found what they were looking for in Batavia, conquered by Jan Pieterszoon Coen in 1619. The city would become the capital of the Dutch East Indies.

For the next forty-four years, the two cities of Goa and Batavia would fight relentlessly, since they stood as the capital of Portuguese India and the VOC's base of operations. With the assistance of the Sultanate of Bijapur the Dutch would even attempt to conquer Goa itself, but Portuguese diplomacy defeated this plan.

In fact, Goa had been under intermittent blockade since 1603. Most of the fighting took place in west India, where the Dutch campaign in Malabar sought to replace the Portuguese monopoly on the spice trade. Dutch and Portuguese fleets faced off for control of the sea lanes as was the case with the action of 30 September 1639, while on mainland India the war involved more and more Indian kingdoms and principalities as the Dutch capitalized on local resentment of Portuguese conquests in the early 16th century.

After the fall of Qeshm and Hormuz to the Persians and English, the Portuguese struck out of their Muscat and Goa bases, which led to a destructive campaign against Persia's coastline and an alliance with Ottoman Basra. Eventually, after a naval battle off Hormuz in 1625, Persia vied for a cease-fire with the Portuguese to be able to reestablish trade and provided Portugal with a trading post in Kong. Together with the reestablished Basra route, this temporarily made up for the loss of Hormuz. The pioneers of the destruction of the Portuguese and Spanish mare clausum doctrine were the Dutch in portions of the East Indies.

In 1624, Fernándo de Silva led a Spanish fleet to sack a Dutch ship near the Siamese shoreline. This enraged King Songtham of Siam, who held the Dutch in great preference and ordered attacks on the Spaniards.

War between Philip's possessions and other countries led to a deterioration of the Portuguese Empire, as the loss of Hormuz to Persia, aided by England, but the Dutch Republic was the main beneficiary.

In 1640, the Portuguese took advantage of the Catalan Revolt and themselves revolted from the Spanish-dominated Iberian Union. From this point onward, the English decided instead to re-establish their alliance with Portugal.

=== VOC gains ground ===
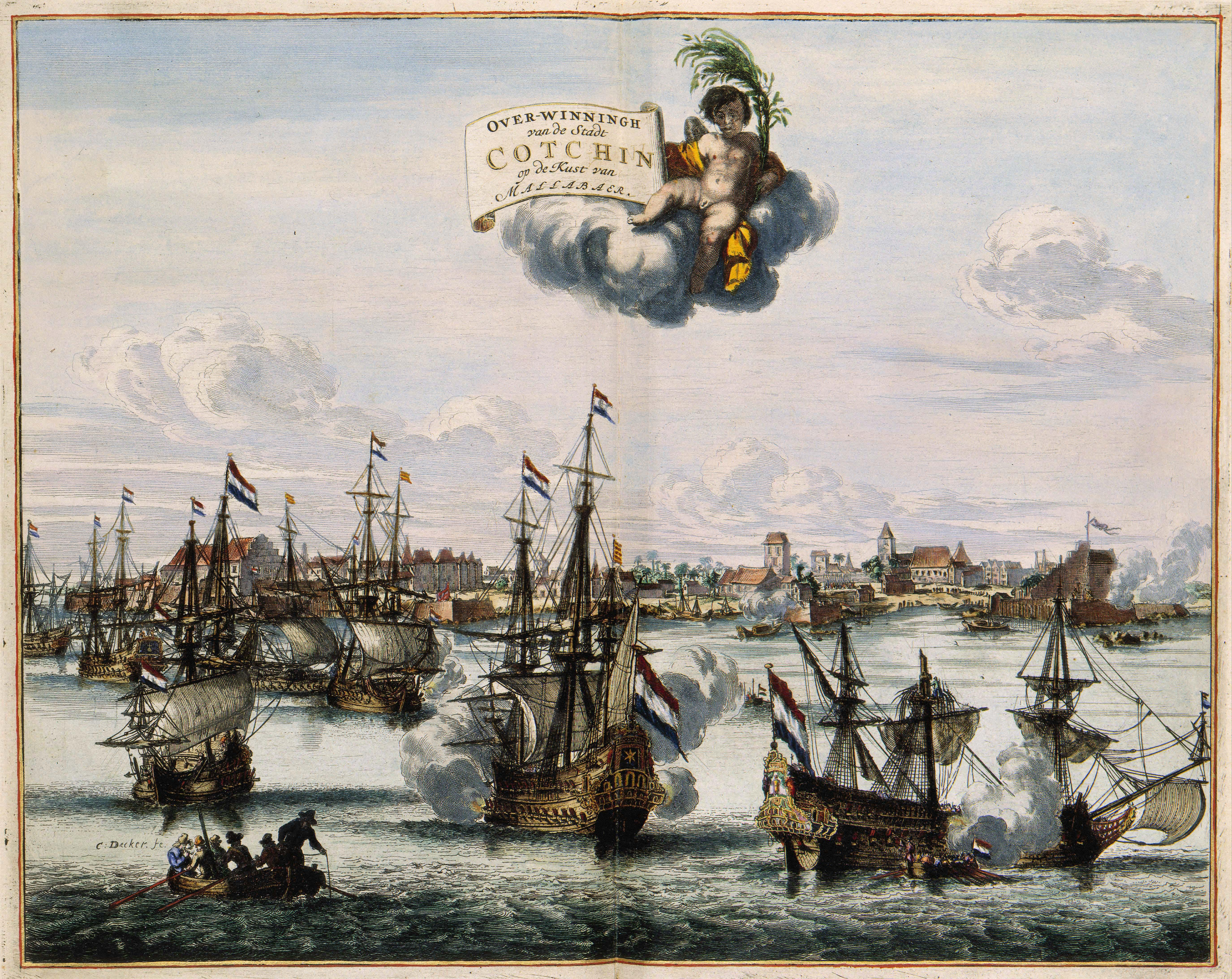
The capture of Kochi and victory of the VOC over the Portuguese in 1663. Atlas van der Hem (1682).

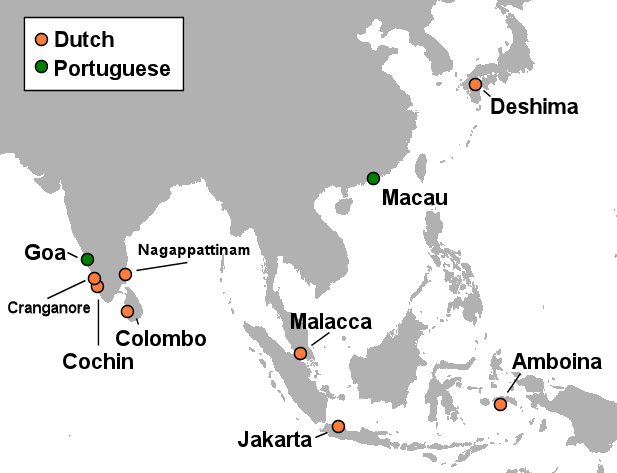
The primary Dutch and Portuguese settlements in Asia, c. 1665. With the exception of Jakarta and Deshima, all Dutch settlements had been captured by the Dutch East India Company from Portugal.

Despite Portugal being at war with Spain, the VOC nevertheless continued attacking Portuguese fortresses in the East Indies. Malacca finally succumbed in 1641.

Important battles also took place in the South China Sea. Combined fleets of Dutch and English vessels, and subsequently exclusively Dutch ships, attacked Macau from which Portugal monopolized the lucrative China–Japan trade. The Dutch failed in four attempts to capture Macau.

The Dutch also tried to force China to accept them in place of Portugal as trading partner with a trading post in the Pescadores. These attempts failed, in part because of the long-standing diplomatic ties between Portugal and the ruling Ming dynasty.

The Dutch were ultimately successful in acquiring the monopoly of trade with Japan.

The Dutch also colonized Taiwan, known to the Portuguese as Formosa. The Dutch established a colony at Tayouan in 1624, and founded present-day Anping in the south. In 1642 the Dutch took northern Formosa from Spain.

The Dutch intervened in the Sinhalese–Portuguese War on Ceylon from 1638 onward, initially as allies of the Kingdom of Kandy against Portugal. The Dutch conquered Batticaloa in 1639 and Galle in 1640 before the alliance broke down. After a period of triangular warfare between the Dutch, Portuguese, and Kandyans, the alliance was remade in 1649.

On 23 March 1654, a naval battle took place near Colombo, Ceylon, when a force of five Portuguese galleons which were escorting five merchant galliots to Colombo, fought its way through a Dutch blockading squadron of three ships. The Portuguese captured two Dutch ships, but their two top officers were killed, and in the resulting confusion, the Dutch recaptured their ships. The two ships ran aground but were refloated. The ships involved were:

Portuguese:

- Nazaré 42 (flag, António Pereira)
- São João 38 (second flag, Álvaro de Novais)
- Santo António de Mazagão 36 (António Sottomaior)
- São José 34 (Francisco Machado Deca)
- São Filipe e Santiago 24 (António de Abreu)

Dutch:

- Windhond
- Renoçer ("Rhinoceros")
- Drommedaris (a yacht)

Renoçer and probably Windhond were the captured ships.

The 2 May 1654 action was a sea battle which took place near Colombo, when a force of 11 Dutch ships led by Rijckloff van Goens defeated three Portuguese galleons, which ran aground and were burnt near Carmona, north of Cabo de Rama. On about 4 May Zijdeworm was burnt as a fireship near Karwar, and on 6 May the Portuguese galleon Nazareth was burnt near Hanovar. These actions removed a significant proportion of Portuguese ships in the Indian Ocean.

Portuguese:

- Santo António de Mazagão 36 (António Sottomaior) - Aground and burnt
- São João Pérola 38 (António de Abreu??) - Aground and burnt
- Nazaré 42

Dutch:

- Avenhoorn 30-40
- Sluys 30-40
- Cabeljauw 30-40
- Hulst 30-40
- Saphier 30-40
- Konijn 30-40
- Gecroonde Leeuw 30-40 (same as Roode Leuw?)
- Muyden 30-40
- Weesp 38
- Popkensburch 30-40
- Zijdeworm 30-40

The first 7 ships dealt with Santo António de Mazagão and the rest with São João Pérola.

After exploiting and then double-crossing their Kandyan allies, the Dutch captured Colombo in 1656 and drove the last Portuguese from Ceylon in 1658. Sporadic warfare with Kandy continued for over a century.

In the aftermath of the destruction of the Tordesillas system, Portugal had managed to retain Diu but not Hormuz. Goa and Macau had also survived but not Malacca. Nevertheless, the downfall of the Portuguese Indian empire was not territorial but economic: the competition of other European powers with greater demographics, easier access to capital, and more direct access to markets than Portugal. Lisbon's distributive monopoly had been stolen from the Islamic world and soon invited more direct competition; it crumbled quickly.

In all, and also because the Dutch were kept busy with their expansion in Indonesia, the conquests made at the expense of the Portuguese were modest: some Indonesian possessions and a few cities and fortresses in South India. The most important blows to the Portuguese eastern empire were the conquests of Malacca in 1641 (depriving them of the control over these straits), Ceylon in 1658, and the Malabar Coast in 1663 (after the signing of the Treaty of The Hague (1661)).

== Brazil: Governorate General vs. GWC ==
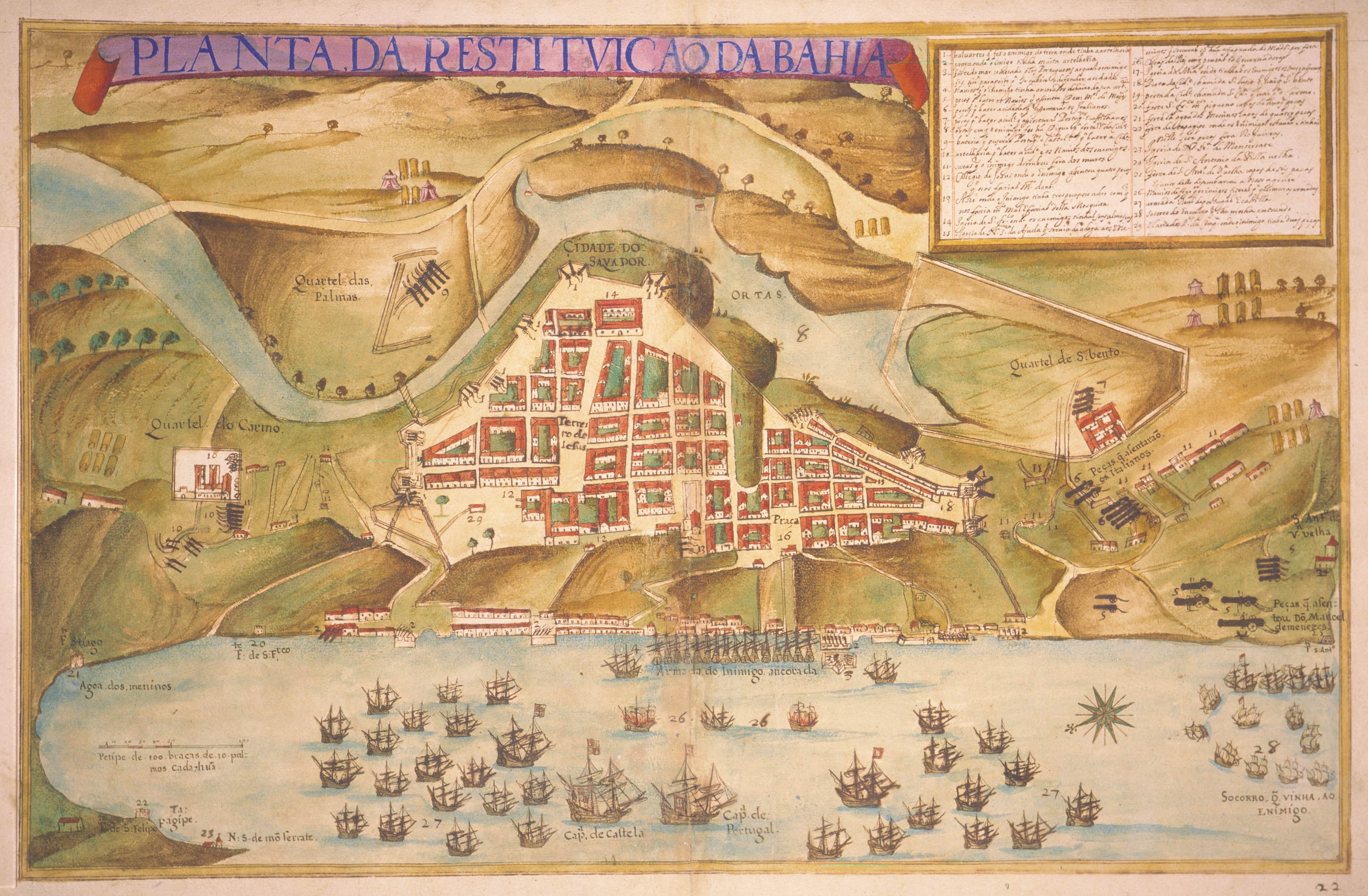
"Map of the Portuguese liberation of the city of Salvador in Brazil in 1625", João Teixeira Albernaz, o Velho, 1631.

Surprised by such easy gains in the East, the Republic quickly decided to exploit Portugal's weakness in the Americas. In 1621, the Dutch West India Company (Geoctroyeerde Westindische Compagnie or GWC) was created to take control of the sugar trade and colonize America (the New Netherland project). The GWC benefited from a large investment in capital, drawing on the enthusiasm of the best financiers and capitalists of the Republic. However, the GWC would not be as successful as its eastern counterpart.

Even before the main Dutch invasion in 1624, the Dutch Republic started establishing outposts in the region around the Xingu River as early as 1599. After a few minor skirmishes, Portuguese forces would conquer the Dutch fort of Maricay. They would spend until 1632 removing the presence of Dutch and their English allies (as well as Irish settlers) in the region.

The Dutch invasion began in 1624 with the conquest of the then capital of the Governorate General of Brazil, the city of São Salvador da Bahia, but the Dutch conquest was short lived. In 1625, a joint Spanish–Portuguese fleet of 52 ships and 12,000 men rapidly recaptured Salvador.

Dutch siege of Olinda and Recife, the largest and richest sugar-producing area in the world.

In 1630, the Dutch returned and captured Olinda and then Recife, renamed Mauritsstadt, thus establishing the colony of New Holland. The Portuguese commander Matias de Albuquerque retreated his forces inland, to establish a camp dubbed Arraial do Bom Jesus. Until 1635, the Dutch were unable to harvest sugar due to Portuguese guerrilla attacks, and were virtually confined to the walled perimeter of the cities. Eventually, the Dutch evicted the Portuguese with the assistance of a local landlord named Domingos Fernandes Calabar, but on his retreat to Bahia, Matias de Albuquerque captured Calabar at Porto Calvo, and had him hanged for treason.

The Portuguese fought back two Dutch attacks on Bahia in 1638. Nonetheless, by 1641, the Dutch captured São Luís, leaving them in control of northwestern Brazil between Maranhão and Sergipe in the south

=== Insurrection of Pernambuco ===
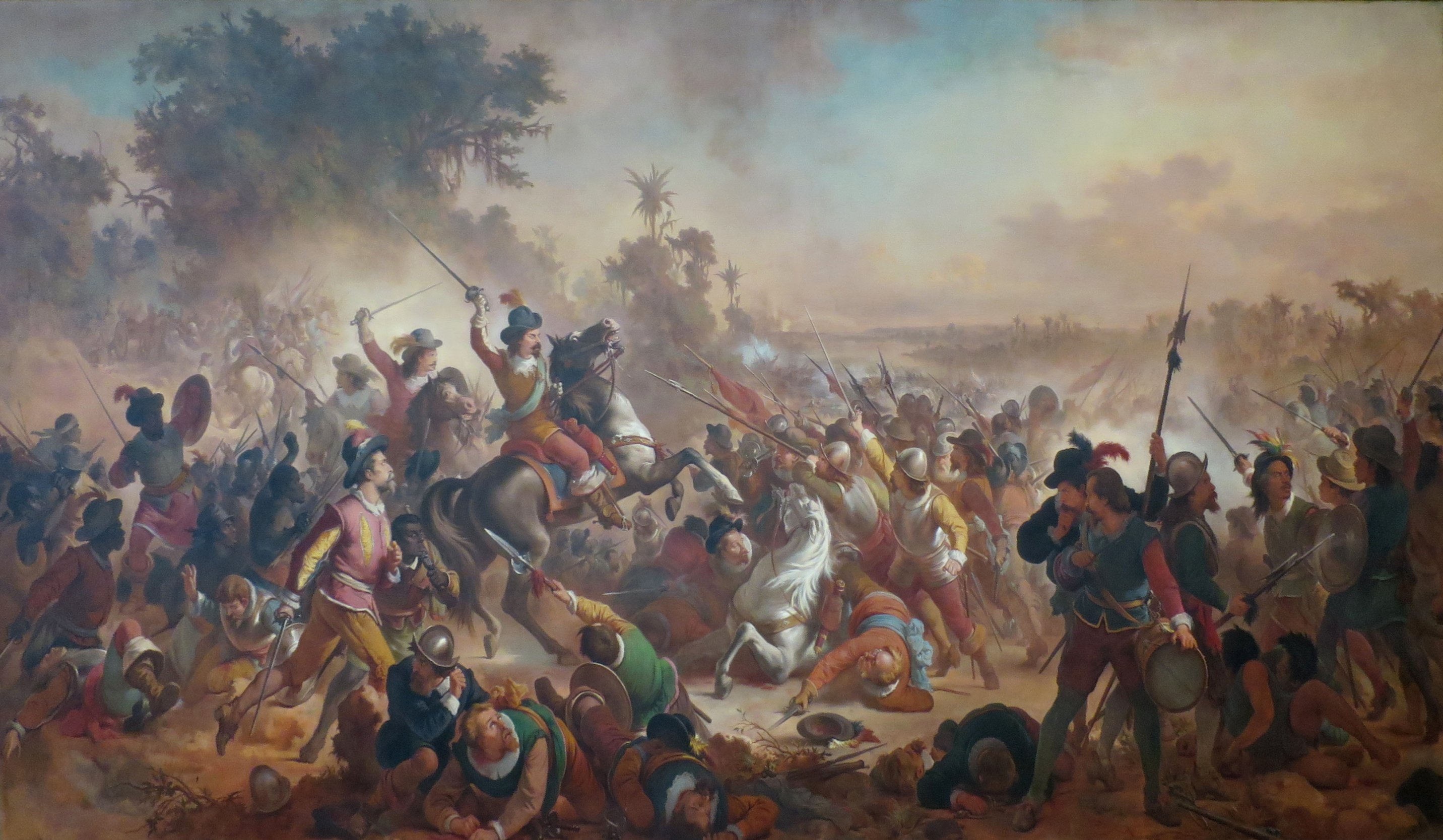
19th-century painting of the Battle of Guararapes

John Maurice of Nassau was recalled from the governorship of New Holland in 1644 because of excessive expenditure and under suspicion of corruption. Mutual hostility between the Catholic Portuguese and Protestant Dutch, and harsh measures to collect from indebted land-owners who had their estates ravaged in the war, ensured that Portuguese settlers came to resent the authority of the new Dutch administration.

In 1645, most of Dutch Brazil revolted under the leadership of mulatto landowner João Fernandes Vieira, who proclaimed himself loyal to the Portuguese Crown. GWC forces were defeated at the Battle of Tabocas, virtually confining the Dutch to the fortified urban perimeters of coastal cities, defended by contingents of German and Flemish mercenaries. Still in that year, the Dutch abandoned São Luís. The Second Battle of Guararapes, in 1649, marked the beginning of the end of Dutch occupation of Portuguese Brazil, until their final expulsion from Recife in 1654.

== West Africa and Angola ==
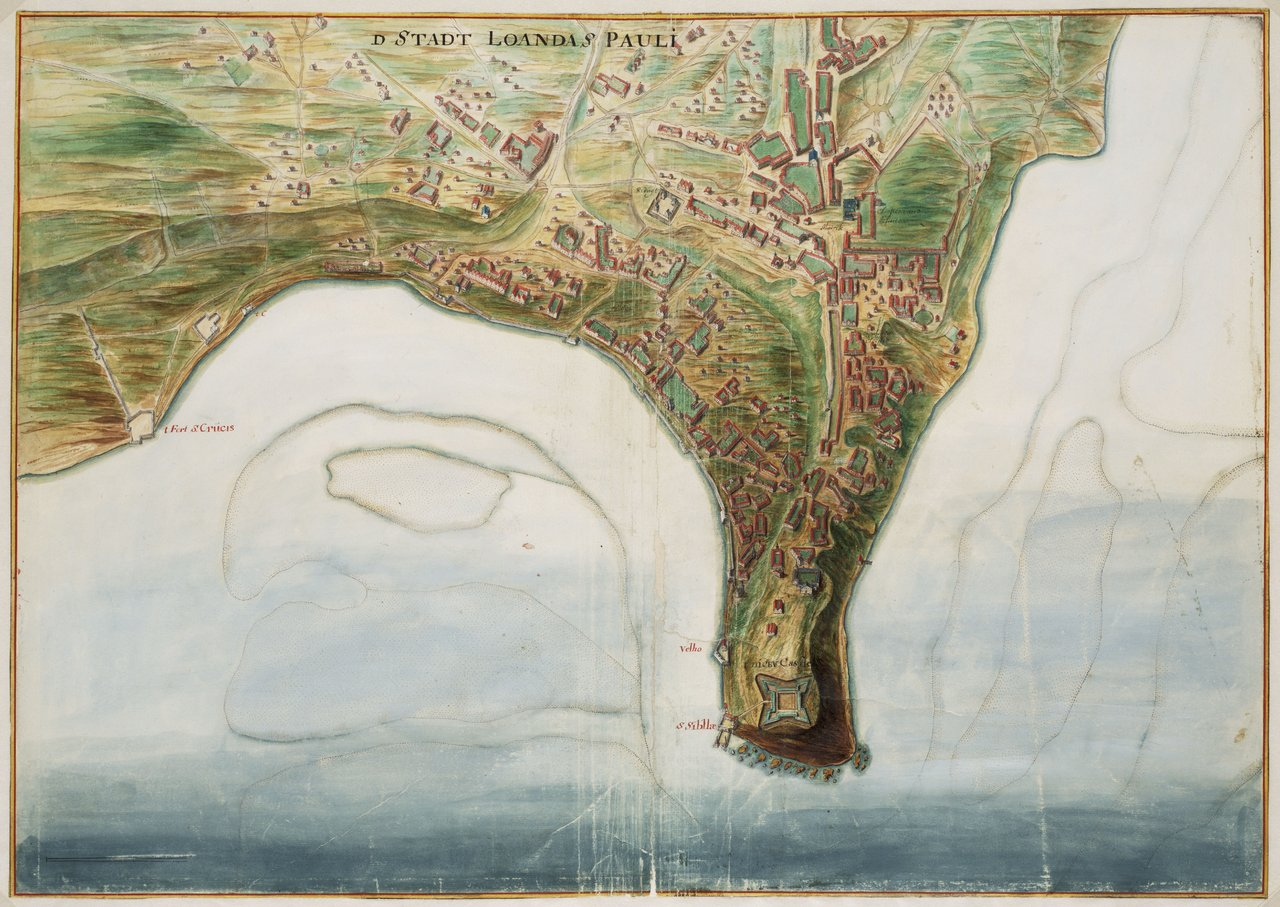
17th-century Luanda

At the same time, the Dutch organized incursions against the Portuguese possessions in Africa in order to take control of the Atlantic slave trade and complete the triangular trade that would ensure the economic prosperity of New Holland.

In 1626, a Dutch expedition to take Elmina was almost wiped out in an ambush by the Portuguese, but in 1637, Elmina fell to the Dutch. In 1641, after a truce between Portugal and the Netherlands had been signed, the Dutch captured the island of São Tomé and before the end of 1642, the rest of Portuguese Gold Coast followed.

In August 1641, the Dutch formed a three-way alliance with the Kingdom of Kongo and Queen Nzinga of Ndongo, and with their assistance captured Luanda and Benguela, though without preventing the Portuguese from retreating inland into strongholds like Massangano, Ambaca, and Muxima. With a steady source of slaves now secure, the Dutch abstained from further action, presuming that their allies would suffice against the Portuguese. Nonetheless, lacking firearms and artillery, Queen Nzinga and the Kongo were unable to decisively defeat the Portuguese and their cannibalistic Imbangala allies.

=== The recapture of Luanda and São Tomé ===
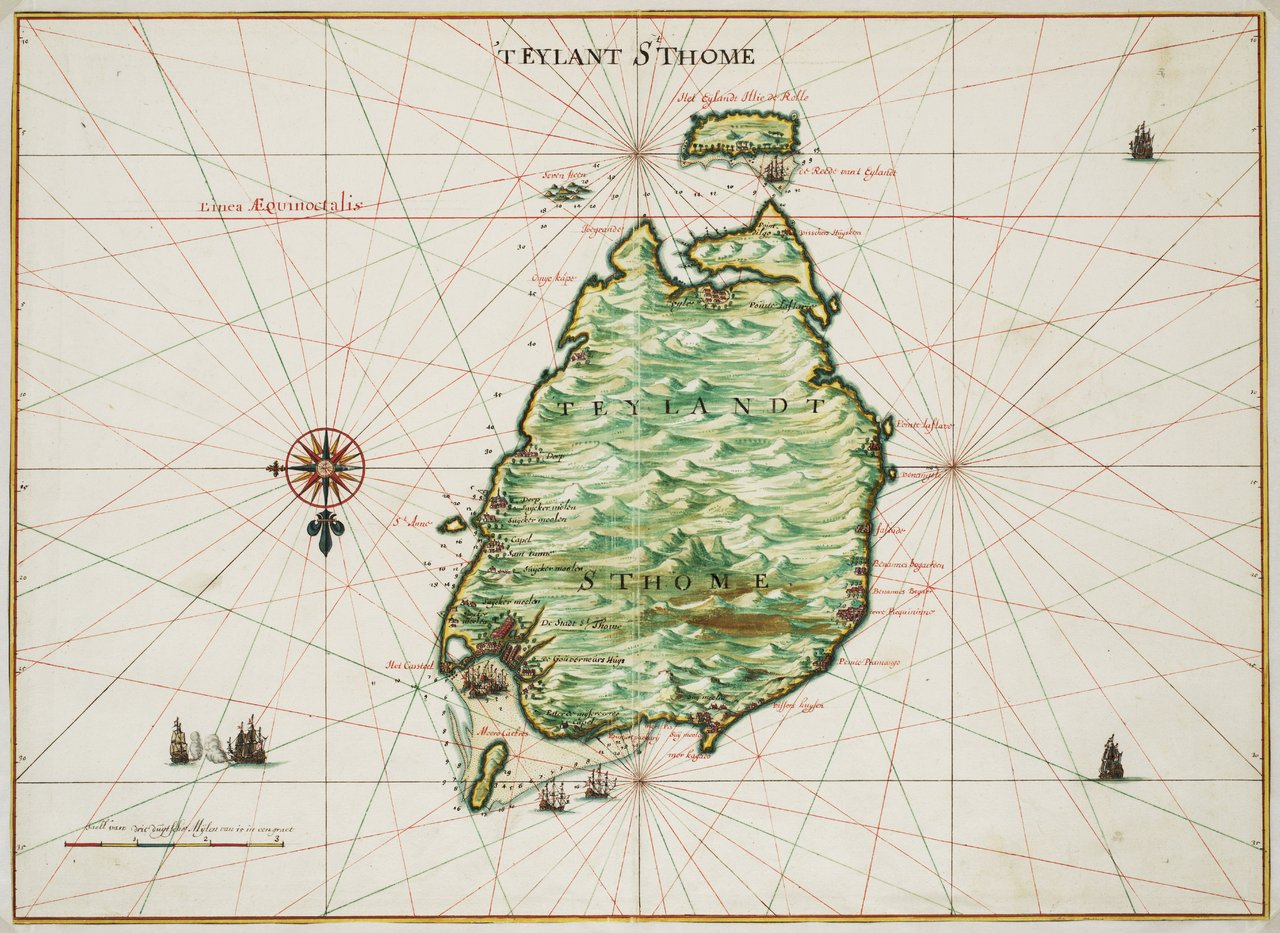
The Island of São Tomé in 1665 by Johannes Vingboons.

In 1648, the Portuguese governor of the captaincy of Rio de Janeiro, Salvador Correia de Sá, organized a military expedition to retake Luanda from the Dutch, directly from Brazil. This is because the Portuguese were unable to send sufficient reinforcements to their colonies due to the ongoing Restoration War in mainland Portugal.

In early August, the fleet reached Luanda, where de Sá communicated to the Dutch garrison that since the Dutch would not respect the terms of the truce, the Portuguese felt no obligation to do so either. Although the Portuguese were outnumbered, a swift display of force achieved on 15 August the surrender of Luanda and all Dutch forces in Angola. Upon hearing of the fall of Luanda, Queen Nzinga retreated to Matamba, while the Dutch in São Tomé abandoned the island, which was reoccupied by the Portuguese later that year.

== Treaty of The Hague ==
The Dutch, determined to recover Brazil, postponed the end of the conflict. Due to the First Anglo-Dutch War, the Dutch Republic had been unable to properly support the GWC in Brazil. With the end of the conflict with the English, the Dutch demanded the return of the colony in May 1654. The Province of Zeeland had the most to gain from the return of the colony, but Johan de Witt, the Grand Pensionary of Holland, preferred a monetary compensation. He did not want to reoccupy the colony and prioritized stronger trading ties with the Portuguese. To compensate Zeeland and save face he demanded eight million guilders from Portugal. The Portuguese, however, refused to return the colony or to pay the indemnity.

In the aftermath of the war against the English, the Dutch fleet was worn and weary, and not able yet to undertake major operations. The Dutch instead authorized privateering assaults upon the Portuguese. In 1657, the Dutch fleet was again fit for large operations and the war resumed. Between 1657 and 1661, Dutch fleets, besides operating in the Second Northern War, regularly cruised before the Portuguese coast. Portuguese privateers also did considerable harm to Dutch West African and American shipping, but the blockades of the Portuguese coast crippled Portuguese maritime trade, while the VOC finished its conquest of Ceylon and the Malabar Coast in India at the same time.

In 1661, Portugal agreed to compensate the Dutch with eight million guilders and ceded the colonies of Ceylon (now Sri Lanka) and the Maluku Islands (part of present-day Indonesia). On 6 August 1661, the Dutch Republic formally ceded Brazil to the Portuguese Empire through the Treaty of The Hague.

== See also ==
- Portuguese Empire
- Dutch Republic
- History of Portugal
- History of the Netherlands
- Dutch Brazil
- Dutch Loango-Angola
- Colonialism
- Dutch East India Company
- Dutch West India Company
- Sinhalese–Portuguese conflicts
- Acehnese–Portuguese conflicts
- Malay–Portuguese conflicts
- Portuguese–Safavid wars
- Ottoman–Portuguese confrontations
  - Anglo-Turkish piracy—Protestant sailors, including Dutchmen like Jan Janszoon or Sulayman Reis, joined the Barbary pirates during this period in order to raid ships of the Iberian Union.
  - Liever Turks dan Paaps
  - Ottoman embassy to Aceh - in response to the presence of Europeans in the Indian Ocean after the voyages of Vasco da Gama and others, the Ottoman Empire undertook a series of naval operations to project power, and protect the Sunni caliphate's merchants and pilgrims from Dutch and Portuguese privateers.
  - Black Legend (Spain)

== Sources ==
- Cools, Hans (2014). Het gelijk van de Gouden Eeuw: recht, onrecht en reputatie in de vroegmoderne Nederlanden (E-book ed.). Uitgeverij Verloren. ISBN 9789087044534.
- Sutton, Elizabeth (2017). Early Modern Dutch Prints of Africa (E-book ed.). Taylor&Francis. ISBN 9781351569057.
- Blok, P.J. (1928). Michiel de Ruyter (PDF) (in Dutch). Martinus Nijhof.
- Bruijn, J. R. (2011). The Dutch Navy of the Seventeenth and Eighteenth Centuries. Oxford: Oxford University Press. ISBN 9780986497353.
- Israel, J. I. (1995). The Dutch Republic: its rise, greatness, and fall, 1477–1806. Oxford University Press. ISBN 9780198730729.
- Rowen, H. H. (1985). John de Witt: statesman of the "True Freedom". Cambridge University Press. ISBN 9780521303910.
