= Siege of Mozambique (1607) =

- Part of Dutch–Portuguese War
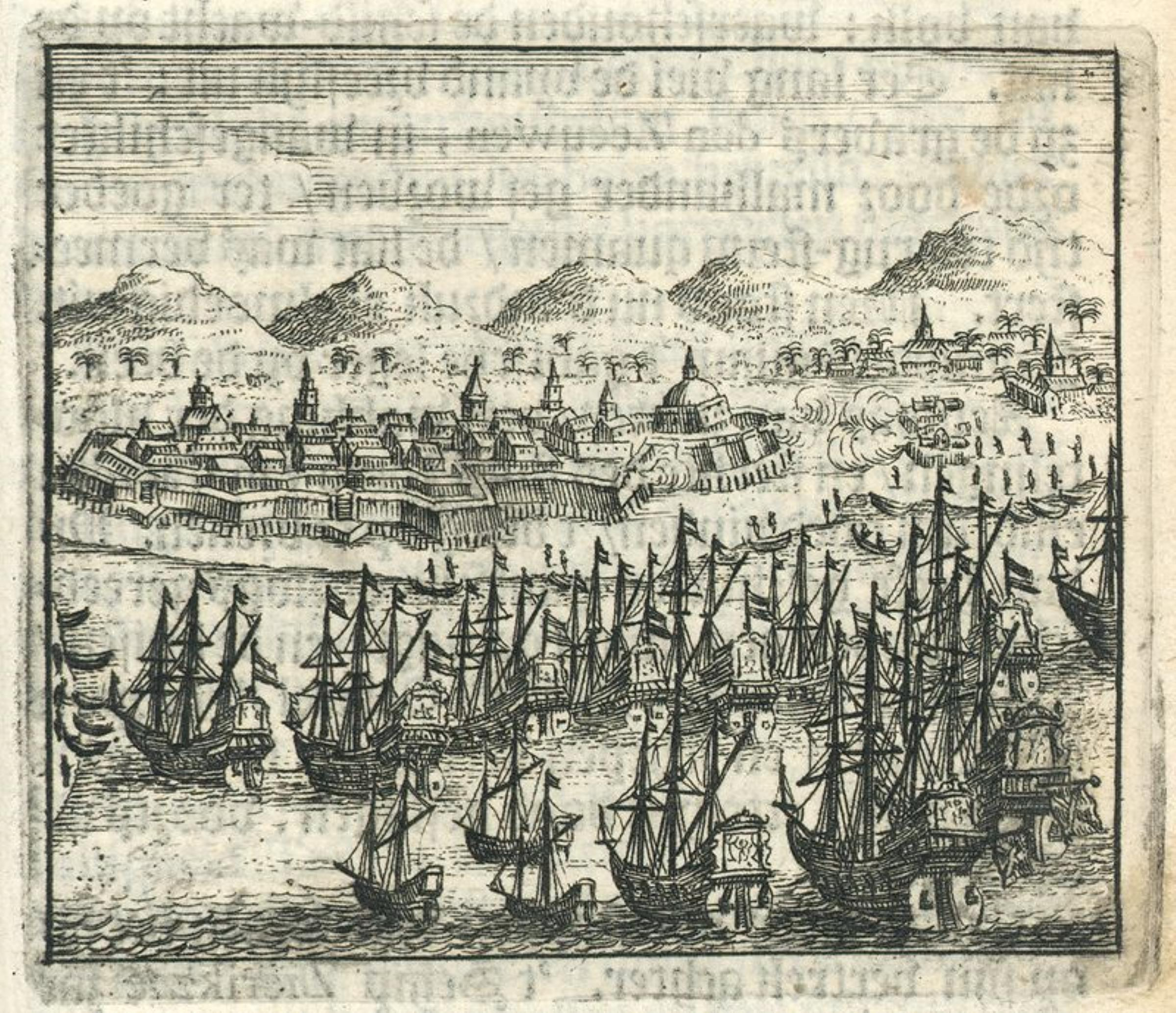
- 17th century engraving depicting the 1607 siege of fort São Sebastião.
Date	29 March – 20 August 1607
Location	Island of Mozambique, Mozambique
Result	Portuguese victory

Belligerents
(Kingdom of Portugal) Portuguese Empire	Dutch East India Company

Commanders and leaders
(Kingdom of Portugal) Dom Estêvão de Ataíde	(Dutch East India Company) Paulus van Caerden

Strength
2 galleons, 1 galiot 60 soldiers 60 Portuguese militia Uncounted number of slaves.	8 warships, 1 patache. 1,060 men.

Casualties and losses
13 dead.	300 dead.

The 1607 Siege of Mozambique was an armed encounter between the forces of the Portuguese Empire and those of the Dutch East India Company or VOC, who attempted to capture the Portuguese Fort São Sebastião on the island of Mozambique. After a six-month campaign, the Dutch withdrew.

== Context ==
The Island of Mozambique was occupied by Portugal in order to serve as an essential port of call between Europe and Asia for their India Armadas, and fortified it in the mid 16th century, building the strong fort São Sebastião. Ever since the capture of the carrack Santa Catarina in 1603 by the Dutch East India Company however, Portugal (then ruled by the Habsburg dynasty) was at war with the Dutch Republic.

The directors of the Dutch VOC sought to capture Mozambique in order to sever Portuguese communications with Asia. On 20 April 1606, Paulus van Caerden set sail from Texel with a force of 1060 men embarked on 8 warships (the Banda, Walcheren, Bantam, Ceylon, Ter Veere, China, Patane and Zierikzee) and one patache. They arrived in Mozambique on 29 March 1607.

The Dutch had already besieged Mozambique before in 1604.

== The siege ==
On 30 March Caerden forced his ships through into the harbour of Mozambique, suffering about 100 dead from cannonfire from the Portuguese fortress. They then manned the launches and managed to capture a Portuguese galliot anchored in the harbour and cut the mooring lines of two poorly defended galleons, which ran aground and were torched.

Bombardment of the fortress began on 1 April. The Portuguese commander Dom Estêvão de Ataíde was greatly outnumbered, having only 60 soldiers, 60 resident Portuguese militiamen and a number of slave auxiliaries, however they were well acquainted with the region and veterans of African campaigns.

After 18 days, van Caerden offered the Portuguese the change to surrender honourably which Dom Estêvão rejected. The Portuguese then challenged 50 Dutch to duel against 25 Portuguese, which the Dutch rejected. This story was not recorded by the Dutch, however. On the night of 29 April, 25 Portuguese conducted a sally on Dutch siege works under the rain, when muskets could not be used and killed 30 sailors, though they were repulsed. During the siege, the local African tribes kept the Portuguese fortress supplied, and refused to provide any to the Dutch at the behest of the Portuguese. Nevertheless, the Portuguese suffered greatly from thirst owing to the number of people who sought refuge within the fortress.

After two months of siege, van Caerden set fire to the Portuguese town and set sail for the Comoros on 29 May, where he expected to acquire supplies, suffering more losses to cannonfire as the Dutch fleet passed once more close to the Portuguese fortress to exit the harbour.

On 22 June the Portuguese were reinforced by three carracks under the command of Dom Jerónimo Coutinho. Van Caerden returned to Mozambique on 4 August, however he remained at bay hoping to capture any passing Portuguese tradeship. By 20 August van Caerden withdrew.

== Aftermath ==
Dom Jerónimo sailed to Goa shortly after the Dutch had left. The 1607 siege of Mozambique demonstrated the viability of resisting powerful Dutch attacks with very limited garrisons.

The Dutch VOC would again attempt to capture Mozambique in 1608 and 1662.

== See also ==
- Portuguese Mozambique
