= Battle of Goa (1638) =

1638 naval battle

Coordinates: 15.563°N 73.818°E

- Part of Dutch–Portuguese War
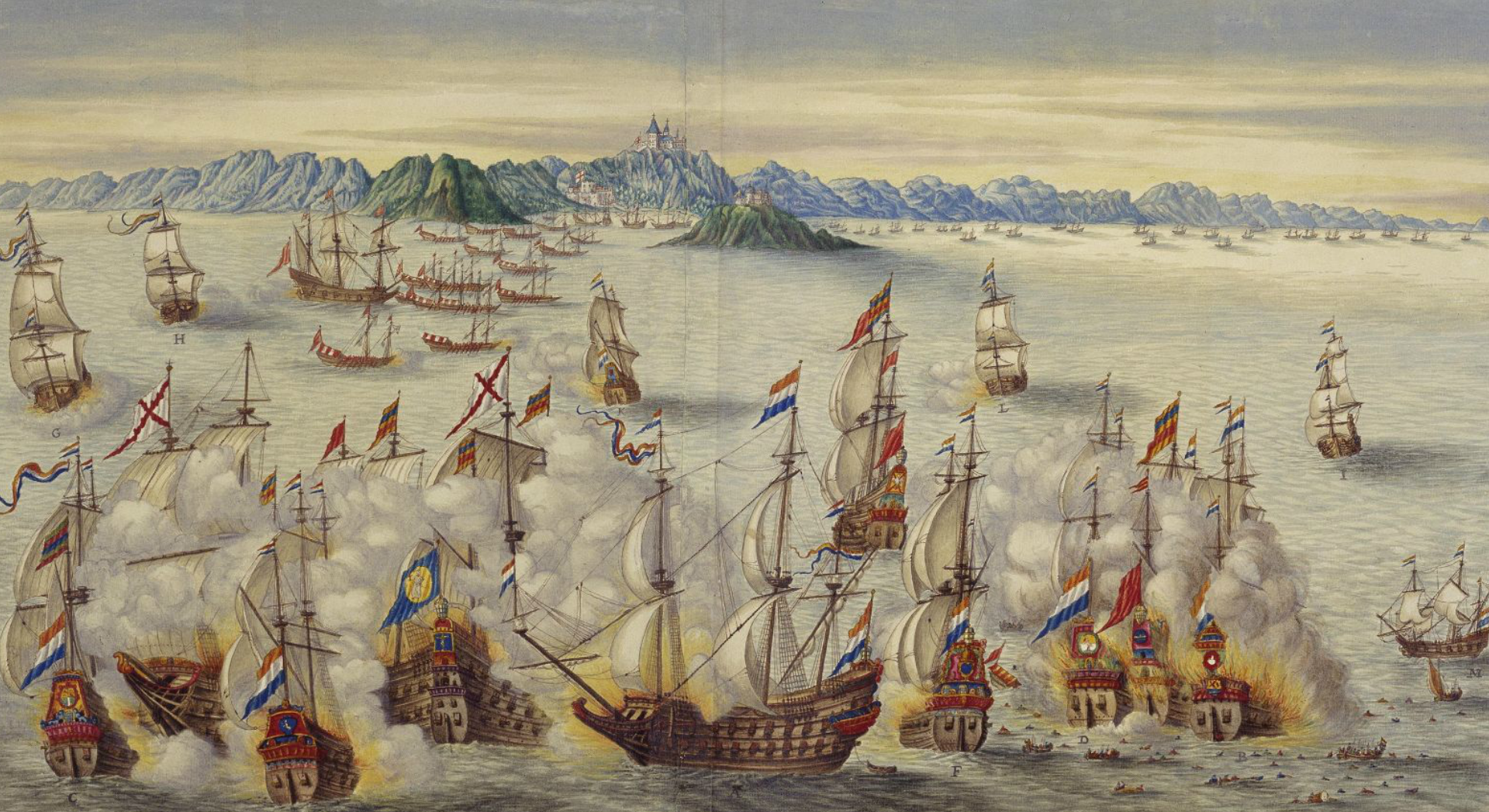
Date	1638–1639
Location	off Goa, Portuguese India
Result	Portuguese victory

Belligerents
(Portugal) Portuguese Empire	Dutch East India Company

Commanders and leaders
(Portugal) Pedro da Silva (Portugal) António Teles de Meneses	Adam Westerwolt; Cornelis Simonsz van der Veere

Strength
5 galleons 1 light carrack 38 fustas	8 carracks 3 light carracks

Casualties and losses
1 small galleon sunk	2 large carracks sunk

The Battle of Goa refers to a series of naval engagements between the Portuguese Armada and the Dutch East India Company fleets attempting to blockade and conquer the city of Goa. In 1638, forces commanded by the Viceroy of Portuguese India, D. Pedro da Silva and later António Teles de Meneses, fought off a large Dutch fleet sent to block the port colony of Goa, commanded by Admiral Adam Westerwolt, who was badly defeated at this encounter.

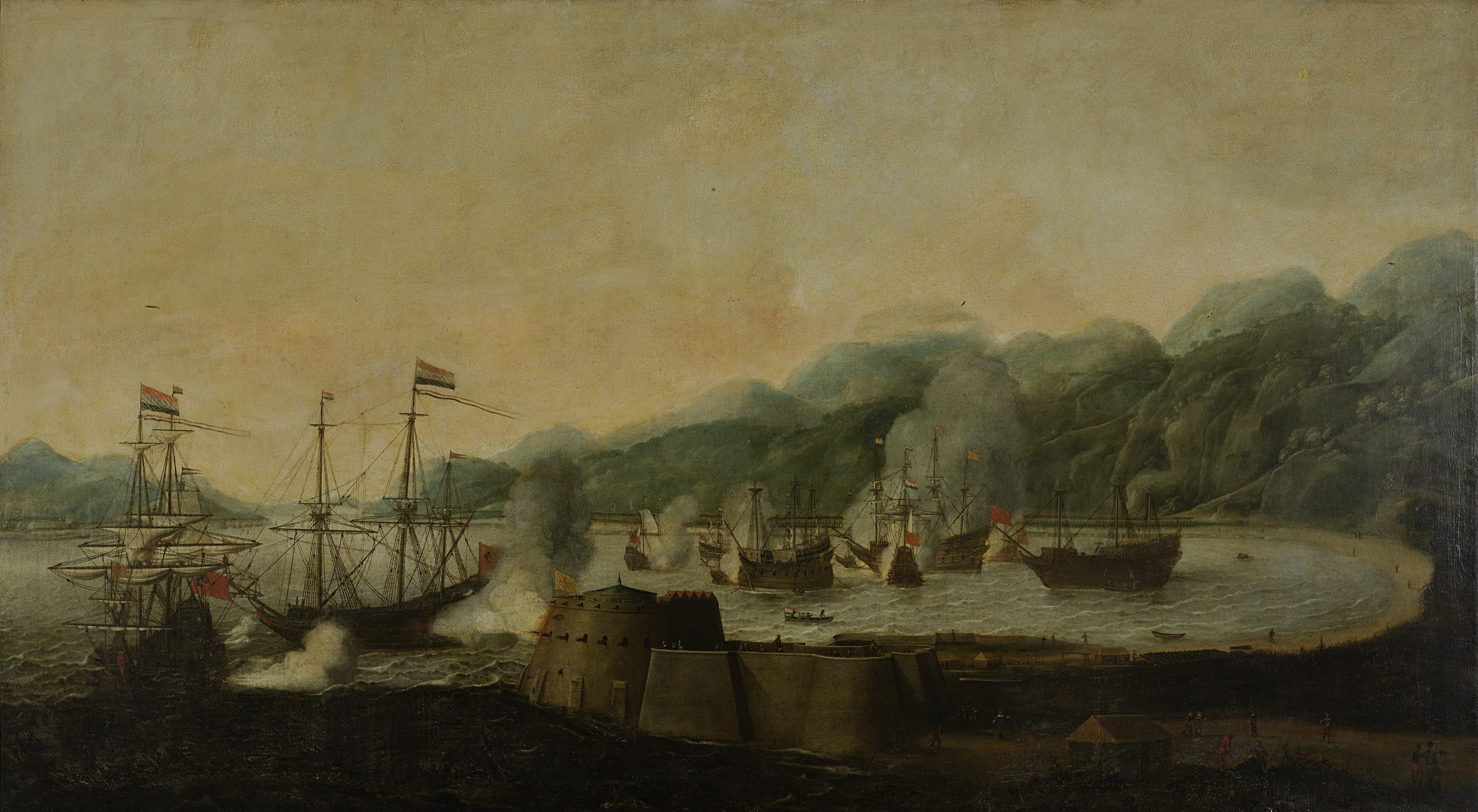
Surprise attack on three Portuguese galleons in the Bay of Goa, 30 September 1639

The next year 1639, the Dutch Admiral Cornelis Simonsz van der Veere would conduct a new raid on Goa's port. The Portuguese galleons Bom Jesus 74 and São Sebastião 50 were being careened and had their guns removed and were captured without fighting. Bom Jesus was set alight and allowed to drift toward the new galleon São Boaventura, which was refusing to surrender, causing São Boaventura to catch fire and blow up. Some of the unarmed "frigates" approached toward the end but were frightened off by the Dutch boats. The Dutch had a total of 261 guns, 810 sailors, and 170 soldiers on their ships.
