= List of uninhabited regions =

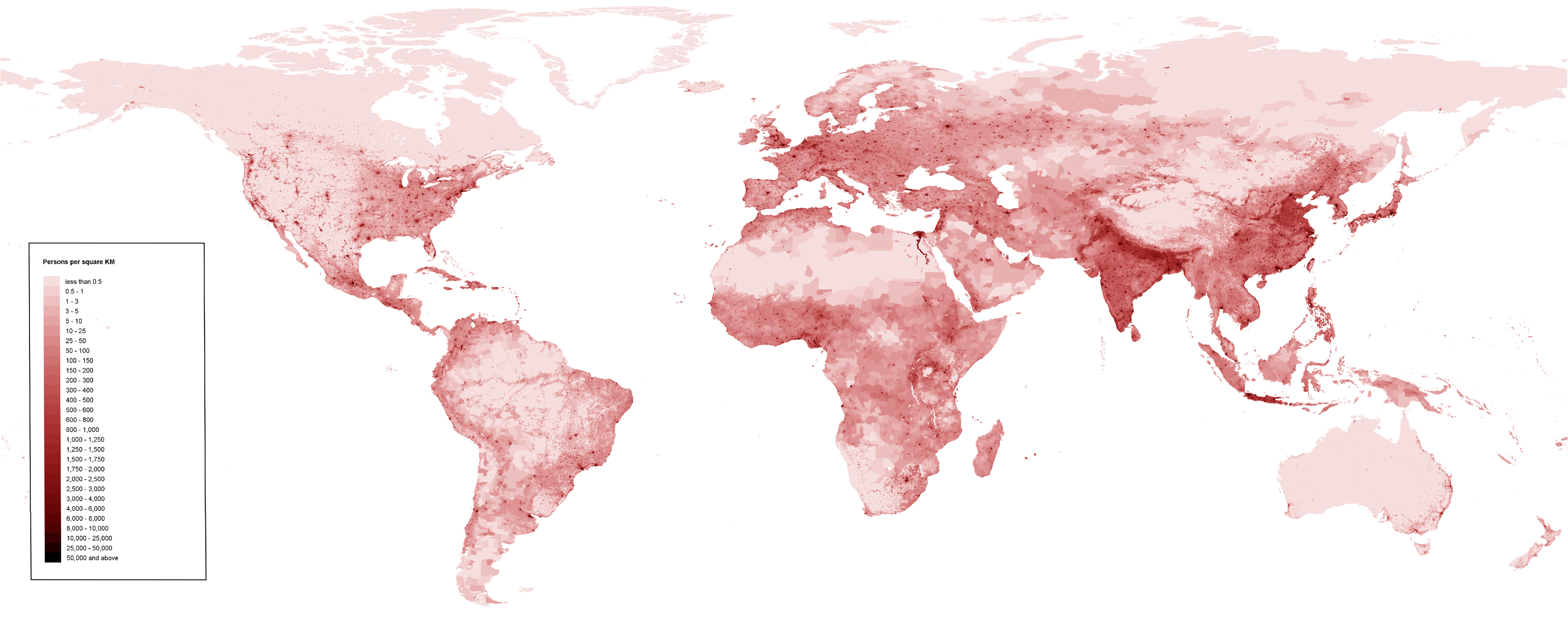
World population density map, with lighter pinks corresponding to less inhabited regions.

The list of uninhabited regions includes a number of places around the globe. The list changes year over year as human beings migrate into formerly uninhabited regions, or migrate out of formerly inhabited regions.

== Definitions ==
The exact definition of what makes a place "uninhabited" is not simple.

Nomadic hunter-gatherer and pastoral societies live in extremely low population densities and range across large territories where they camp, rather than staying in any one place year-round. During the height of settler colonialism many European governments declared huge areas of the New World and Australia to be Terra nullius (land belonging to no one), but this was done to create a legal pretext to annex them to European empires; these lands were not, and are not uninhabited. While some communities are still nomadic, there are many remote and isolated communities in the less populated parts of the world that are separated from each other by hundreds or thousands of kilometres of "uninhabited" wilderness, but these regions are still used for trapping, berry picking, mushroom hunting and so on, and are of spiritual significance to the settled descendants of formerly nomadic people.

Other places may not have a permanent resident population and yet still contain many humans who stay temporarily, as for example in national parks. Jasper National Park in Canada received 1,672,497 visitors in 2020 for example, but no one lives permanently in most of the park (Improvement District No. 12, the local government area that includes most of the park had a population of 0 in 2021).

Generally speaking, only a few regions of the dry-land part of the Earth are so remote or have such a harsh climate that no one uses those areas for even part of the year. These places are tiny islands, the driest part of large deserts, very high mountains, and ice caps. The only other areas which are completely free of people are areas set aside by law such as strict nature reserves, sacred mountains, bombing ranges, and exclusion zones.

== List ==
As a group, the list of uninhabited places are called the "nonecumene". This is a special geography term which means the uninhabited area of the world.

=== Africa ===
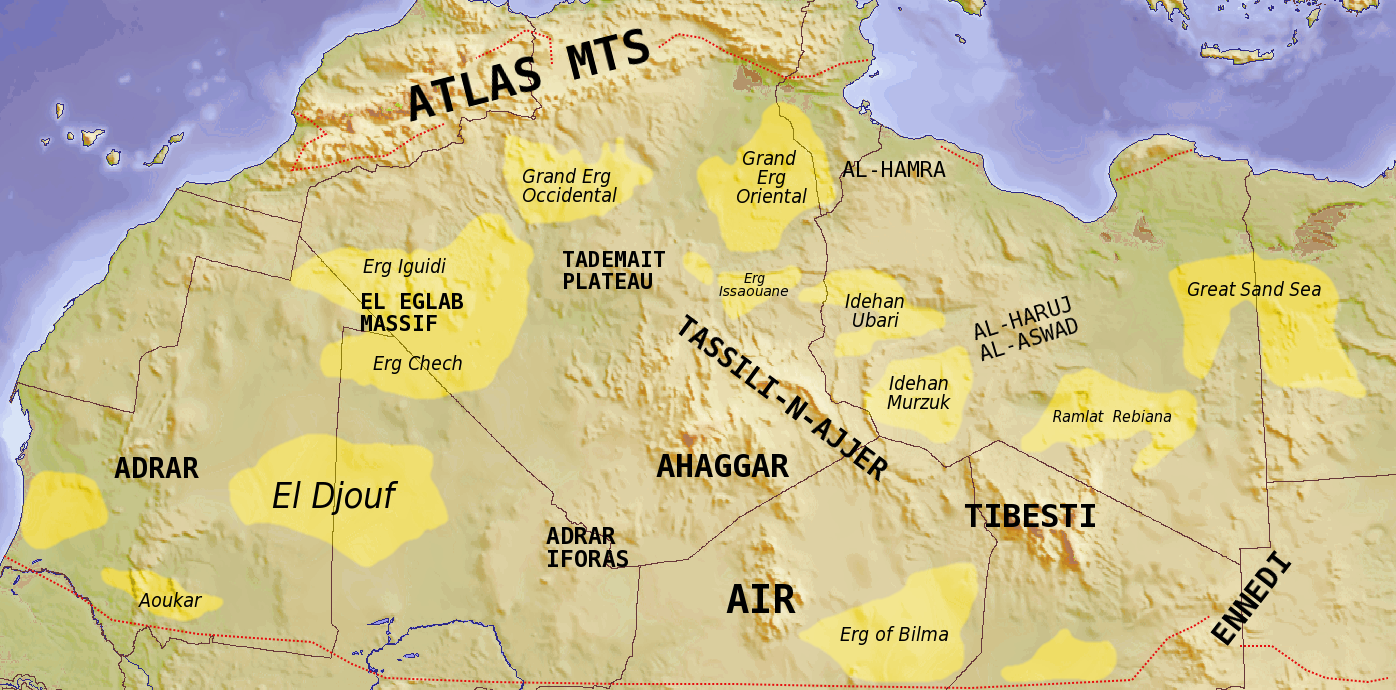
A map of the ergs and mountain ranges of the Sahara.

The Sahara, the world's largest non-icecap desert, is not uninhabited and even remote areas like In Guezzam Province, Algeria, have a population of tens of thousands. The only truly uninhabited places in the Sahara are the ergs: sand dune fields. Even the hot and salty dried lake beds have Bedouin communities within them that graze their animals in the salt marshes and at nearby oases, for example the below-sea level Qattara Depression contains the tiny village of Qara Oasis and cannot be said to be truly uninhabited.

=== Antarctica ===
All of Antarctica is uninhabited aside from a few scientific research stations because of its freezing temperatures and lack of places to grow food or keep livestock.

=== Arctic ===
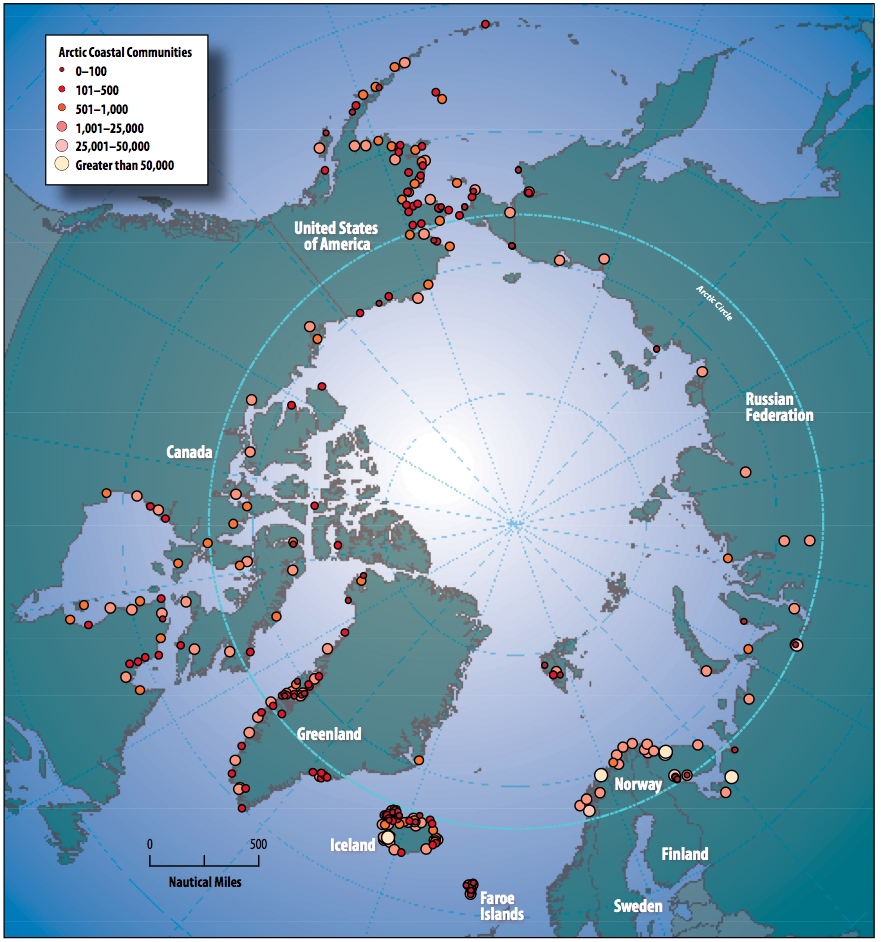
This map shows the human settlements along the Arctic Ocean.

About 4 million people live north of the Arctic Circle and many hundreds of thousands more within the Arctic Ocean drainage basin but outside of the Circle. The only parts of the Arctic that are truly uninhabited are the interior and northernmost coasts of Greenland, many of the islands in the Canadian Arctic Archipelago and some other islands in Northern Norway and the Russian North. Devon Island, in the Canadian North, is the world's largest uninhabited island.

Northeast Greenland National Park, which is the world's largest terrestrial protected area, has had a census population of 0 for many years since the only mine in the region closed. Nevertheless parts of this remote area can see seasonal use: 31 people and about 110 dogs were present over winter of 2008.

=== Australia ===
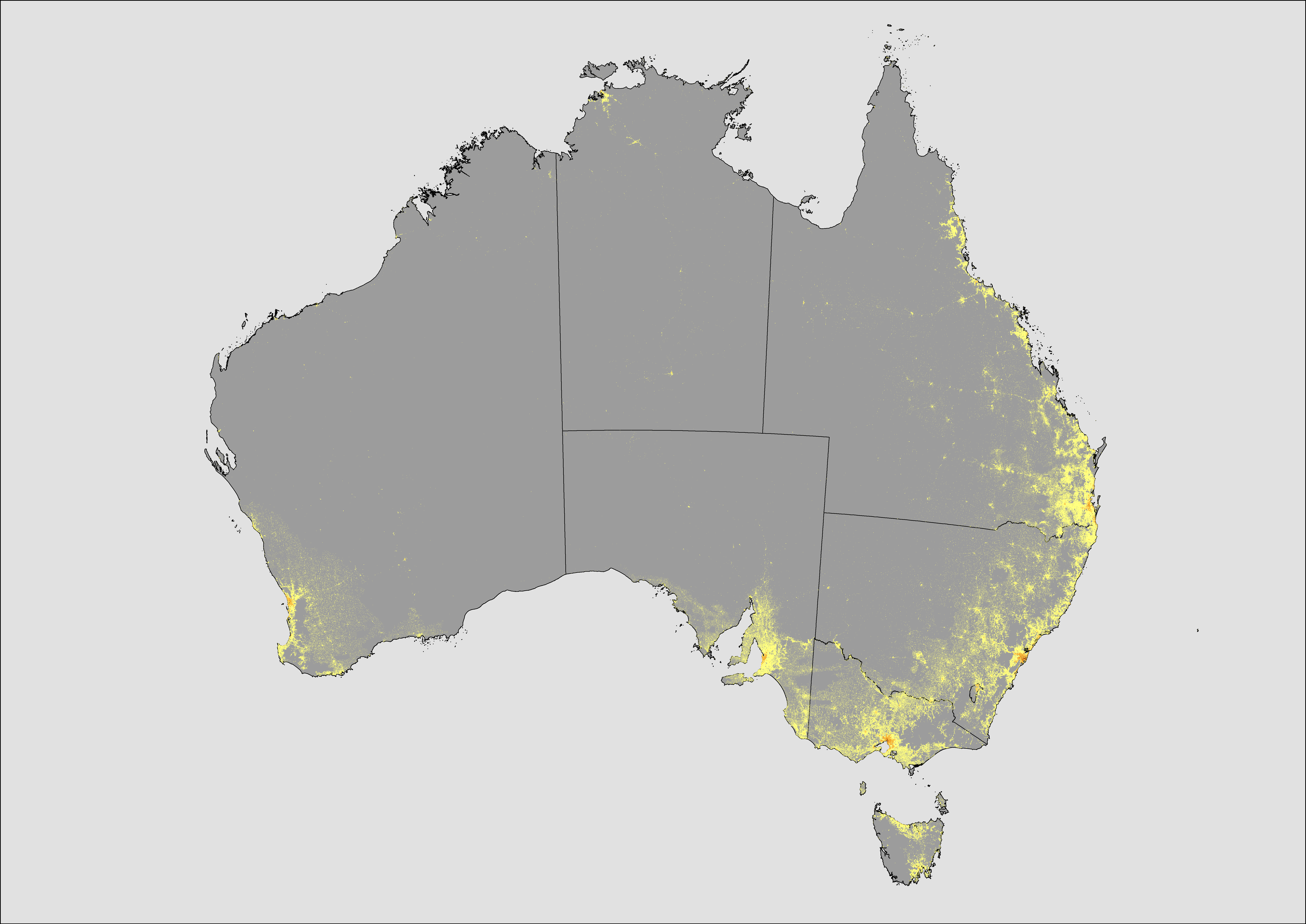
A population density map of Australia. Most of the continent is very sparsely populated, but only a few areas are truly deserted.

Even the driest regions of Australia have indigenous communities within them. There are however, several ergs (sand dunes and salt plains) that are truly uninhabited.

=== North America ===
Besides the Arctic and Subarctic (see above), few areas of any size in North America can be said to be uninhabited. Most of these are strict nature reserves or wilderness area protected by law. Among the largest of these are Improvement District No. 25, Alberta (4,601.52 square kilometres (1,776.66 sq mi) and Tweedsmuir South Provincial Park, British Columbia (989,616 hectares (3,820.93 sq mi). Historically some areas, such as the Desert of Ocute were abandoned due to warfare.

=== Others ===
- Antipodes Islands
- Ashmore and Cartier Islands
- Bajo Nuevo Bank
- Baker Island
- Ball's Pyramid
- Balleny Islands
- Big Major Cay
- Bouvet Island
- Caroline Island
- Clipperton Island
- Elephant Island
- Elobey Chico
- Ernst Thälmann Island
- Much of Fiordland, New Zealand
- Goa Island
- Gough Island
- Hans Island
- Harmil
- Hashima Island
- Hatutu
- Heard Island and McDonald Islands
- The upper alpine zone and nival zone of the Himalaya (and most other high mountains).
- Howland Island
- Ilha da Queimada Grande
- Inishark
- Jaco Island
- Jarvis Island
- Jong Batu
- Kahoʻolawe Island
- Kerguelen Islands
- Kingman Reef
- Little Colonsay
- Mborokua
- Minquiers and Ecréhous
- Melville Island
- Monomoy Island
- Perejil Island
- Pheasant Island
- Prince Edward Islands
- Navassa Island
- Nomans Land
- Paracel Islands
- Palmyra Atoll
- Redonda
- Round Island
- South Orkney Islands
- Spratly Islands
- Stirling Island
- Siwalik (outermost Himalayan foothills) and surrounding alluvial skirt Bhabar in India, Pakistan, Nepal and Bhutan, apparently due to endemic malaria and droughty soils.
- St Kilda
- Tetepare Island
- Tibet's upper alpine zone and nival zone.
- Tinakula
- Vaindloo

== See also ==
- Desert island
- List of ghost towns by country
- Private island
- List of largest protected areas
