= Lumbo =

Port on the Indian Ocean in Mozambique's Nampula Province

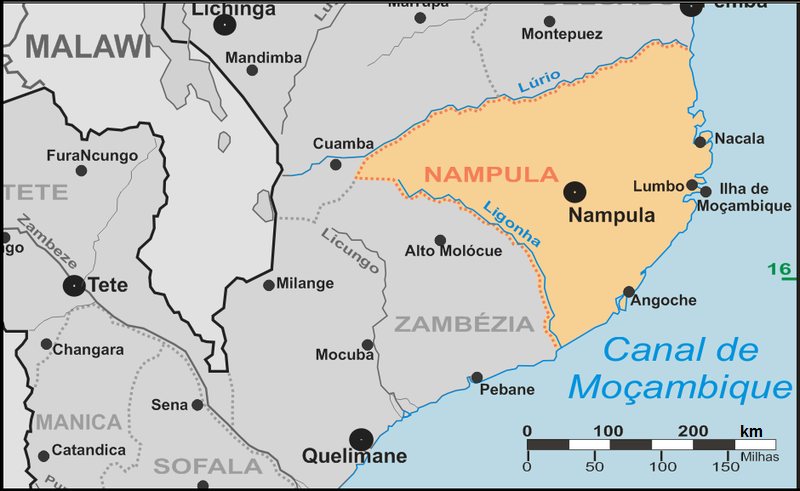
- A map of the Nampula Province showing Lumbo on the coast.
- Interactive map of Lumbo
- Location in #Mozambique

Location
- Country: Mozambique
- Location: Island of Mozambique District, Nampula Province
- Coordinates: 15°00′38″S 40°39′59″E

Lumbo is a port on the northeast Indian Ocean coast of Mozambique. It is part of the Island of Mozambique District in Nampula Province.

It was served by a branch of the main northern line of the national Mozambique railway system which also serves the bigger port of Nacala to the north. It is also home to Lumbo Airport.

The Mozambique Island Bridge connects Lumbo with the Island of Mozambique.
