= Cidade de Pedra =

Cidade de Pedra is Portuguese for Stone Town. It may refer to:

- Stone Town, the old part of Zanzibar City
- Stone Town, Mozambique
