= Fort São Sebastião (Mozambique) =

Fort in Mozambique

- Stone Town, Nampula Province in Mozambique
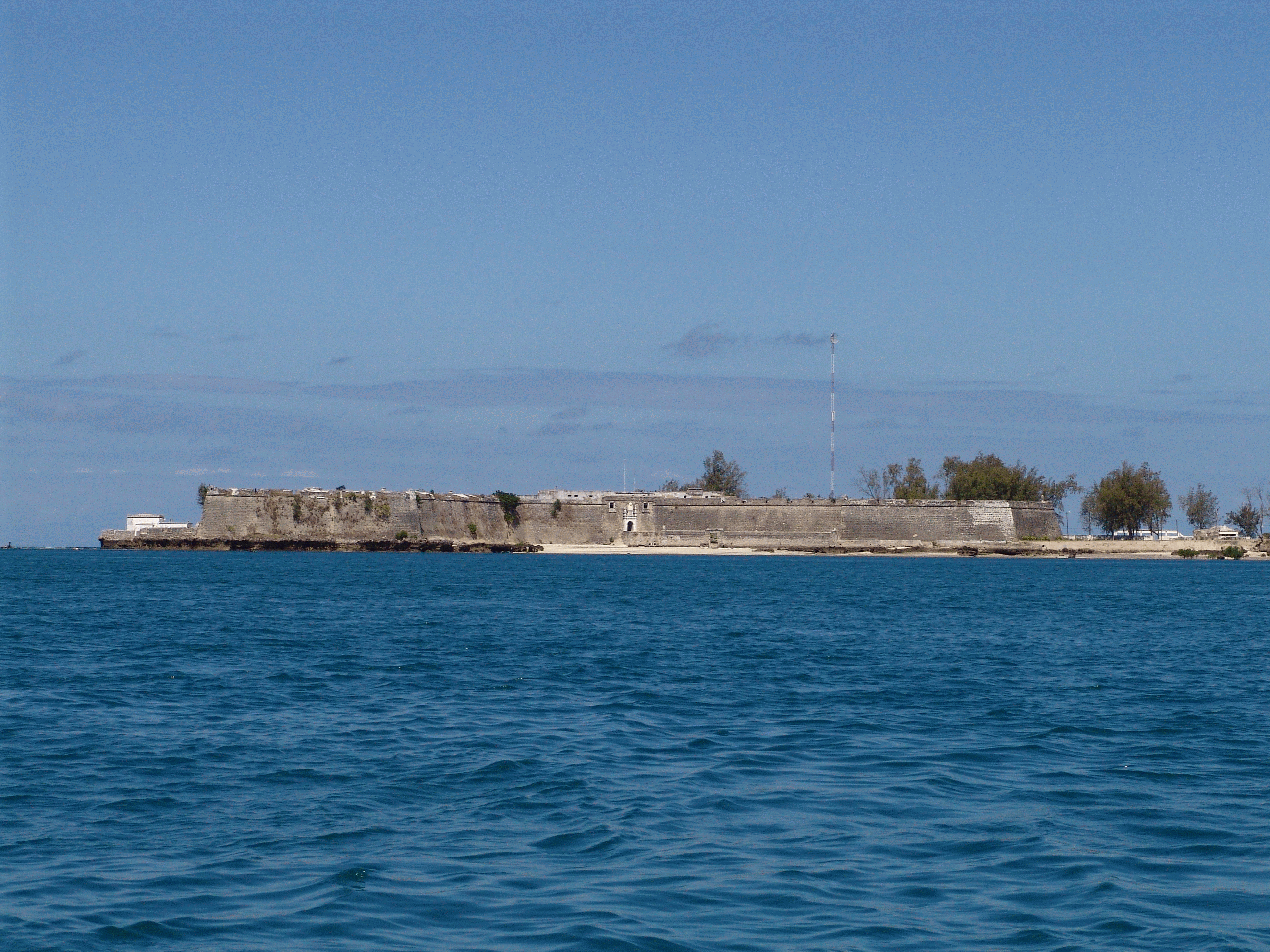

Location
- Coordinates: 15.029°S 40.743°E

Site history
- Built: 1558
- Built by: Portuguese Empire

The Fort of São Sebastião lies at the northern end of Stone Town on the Island of Mozambique. It is the oldest complete fort still standing in sub-Saharan Africa. Construction by the Portuguese began in 1558, and it took about fifty years to complete.

Immediately beyond the fort is the recently restored Chapel of Nossa Senhora de Baluarte, built in 1522, which is considered to be the oldest European building in the southern hemisphere. It is also one of the best examples of Manueline vaulted architecture in Mozambique.

This was shown in the 1964 movie Africa Addio / Africa Blood and Guts

== 3D documentation ==
In 2013, the Zamani Project documented Fort of São Sebastião with terrestrial 3D laser scanning. The non-profit research group from the University of Cape Town (South Africa) specialises in 3D digital documentation of tangible cultural heritage. The data generated by the Zamani Project creates a permanent record that can be used for research, education, restoration, and conservation.
