= Goa Island =

Island in Nampula, Mozambique

Native name: Ilha de Goa (Portuguese) Nickname: Watólofu, Saint George Island
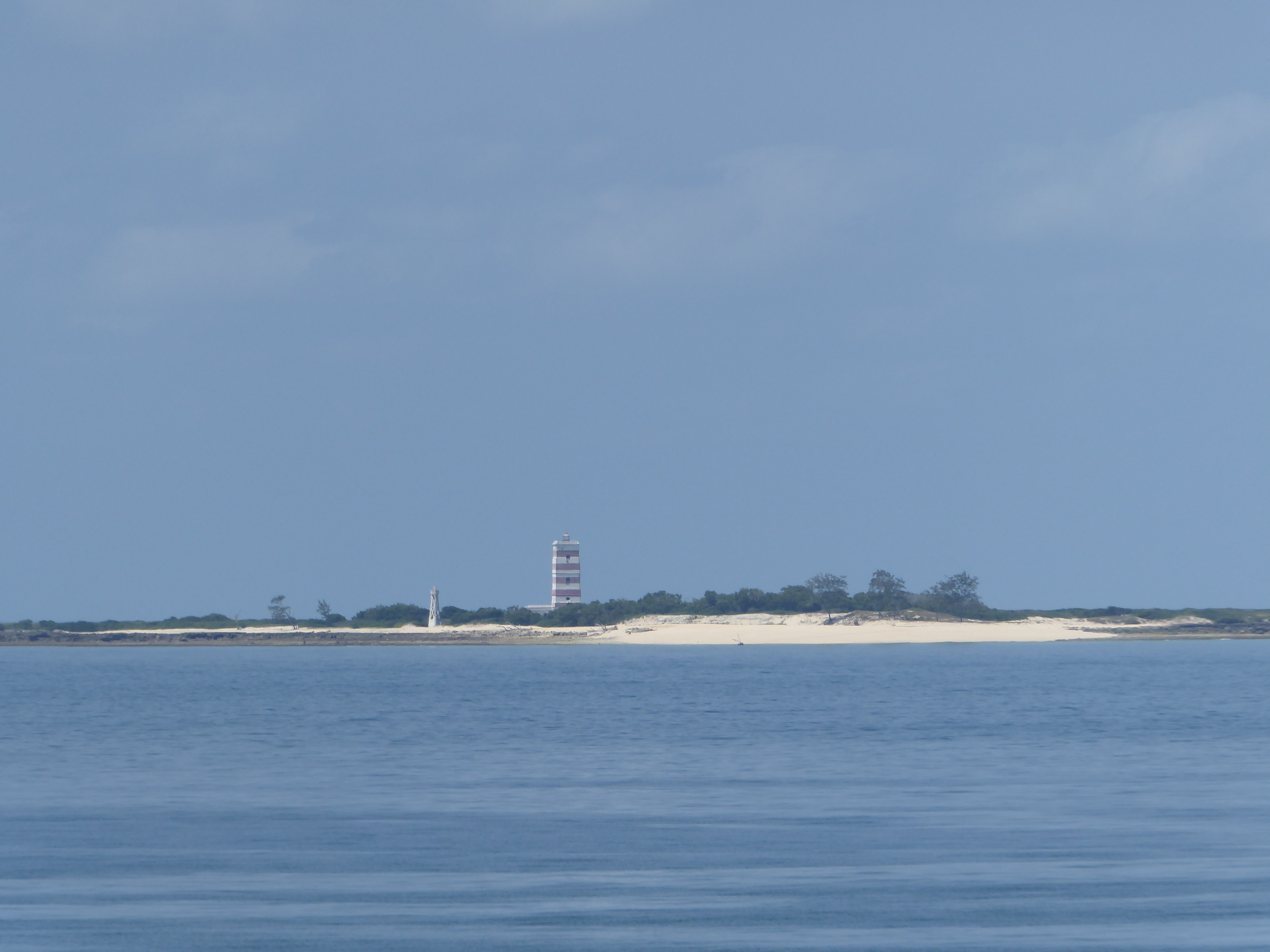
- Ilha de Goa skyline

- Location within Mozambique Location within Africa

Geography
- Location: Indian Ocean
- Coordinates: 15°03′10″S 40°47′04″E
- Type: Uninhabited
- Adjacent to: Island of Mozambique
- Highest elevation: 8 m (26 ft)

Administration
- Mozambique
- Province: Nampula
- President of the Municipal Council of the Island of Mozambique: Alfredo Matata

Additional information
- Time zone: Central Africa Time

Goa Island (Portuguese: Ilha de Goa, lit. 'Island of Goa'), locally known as Watólofu, also known as Saint George Island (Portuguese: Ilha São Jorge), is a small archetypal desert island, with a flat rocky brown coral reef outcrop with dense borderline vegetation, white sand beach and a lighthouse. It is surrounded by crystal clear water, home to a variety of tropical fishes. The island is uninhabited and located within Nampula Province in Mozambique. It is situated in the Indian Ocean near Mozambique Channel about 5 km (3.1 mi) east of Mozambique Island and is part of an archipelago with Island of Sena (Portuguese: Ilha de Sena) and Island of Mozambique.

== Etymology ==
The origin of the name "Ilha de Goa" is derived from its location within the sea route of Goa, India. It was a base of the Portuguese Mozambican government between 1509 and 1662.

== Landmark ==
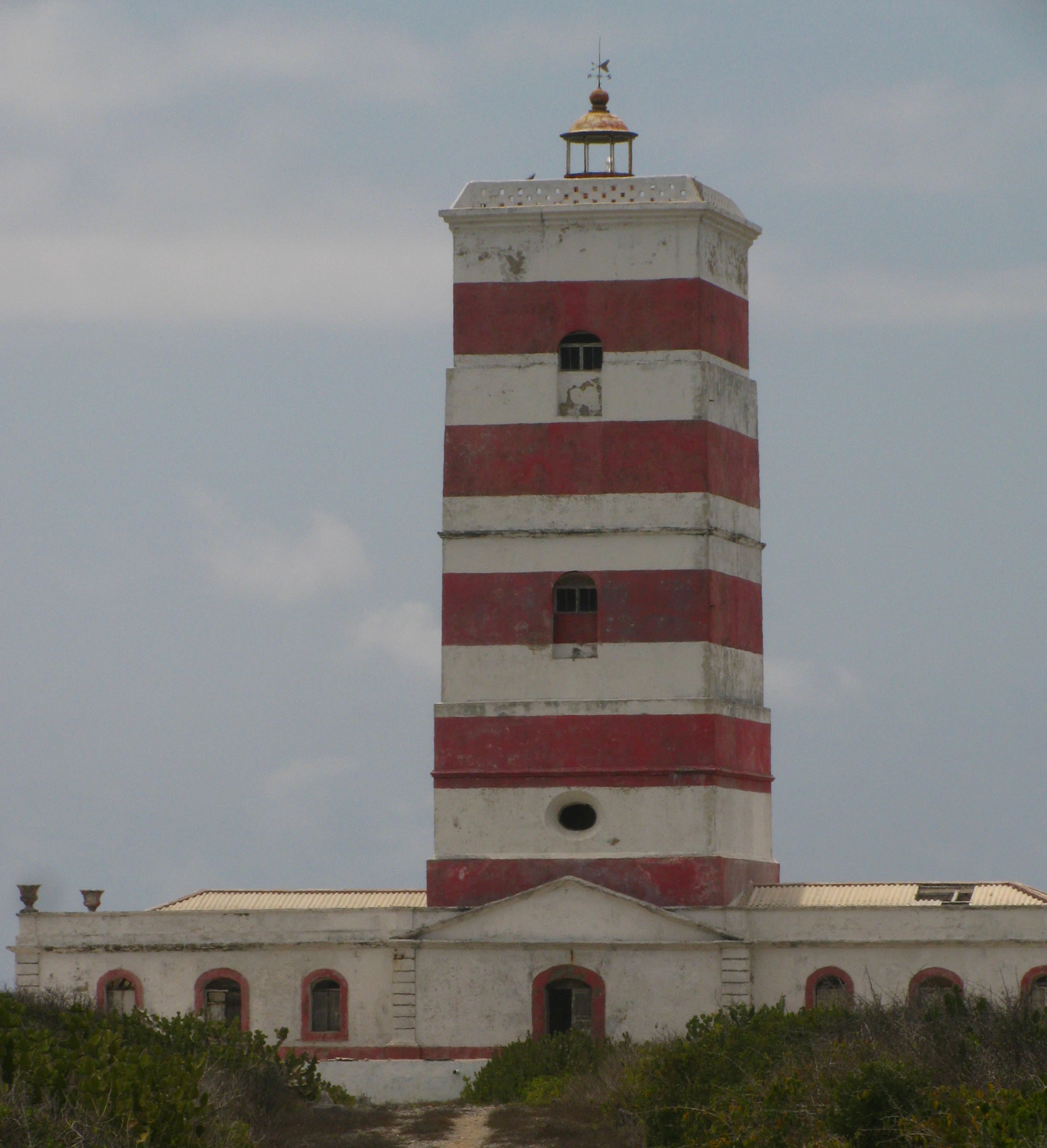
The lighthouse in Ilha de Goa

The island has a solar powered lighthouse located at the entrance of the Mossuril Bay, it is used as a guide for the offshore vessels en route to Island of Mozambique and is still in service, run by the lighthouse keeper and his family that lived in Goa, India for more than two decades. It is one of the oldest and popular lighthouses in Mozambique, built during the Portuguese Mozambique era in 1876 and is an oldest example of the robust square tower design of lighthouses in Zanzibar and the coast of German East Africa (now Tanzania).

During the 20th-century in 1923 the station was upgraded with new lanterns and lenses with the tower being raised from its original height of 12 m (39 ft) to 31 m (102 ft). It is accessible by the public, one can witness the panoramic view from the top of the lighthouse which is next to the island's beach.

== Shipwreck ==
On 7 July 2011, the Goa and Sena islands were closed for tourism as a result of a shipwreck which resulted in 8 fatalities, six students and two missionary Sisters of Charity from Spain. The islands that were used for hosting parties, excursions and tours were halted operations and were used as a subject of study to determine the safety of receiving future tourists, announced Alfredo Matata, the president of the municipal council of Mozambique Island.

The case study was examined by a team of technicians from Instituto Nacional do Mar (INAMAR). A mass was celebrated in the Archdiocese of Nampula for the victims along with local awareness campaigns that were carried out to explain the islanders and tourists to immediately stop visiting these two islets.
