= Mozambique Island Bridge =

Mozambique Island Bridge Ilha de Moçambique Ponte (Portuguese)
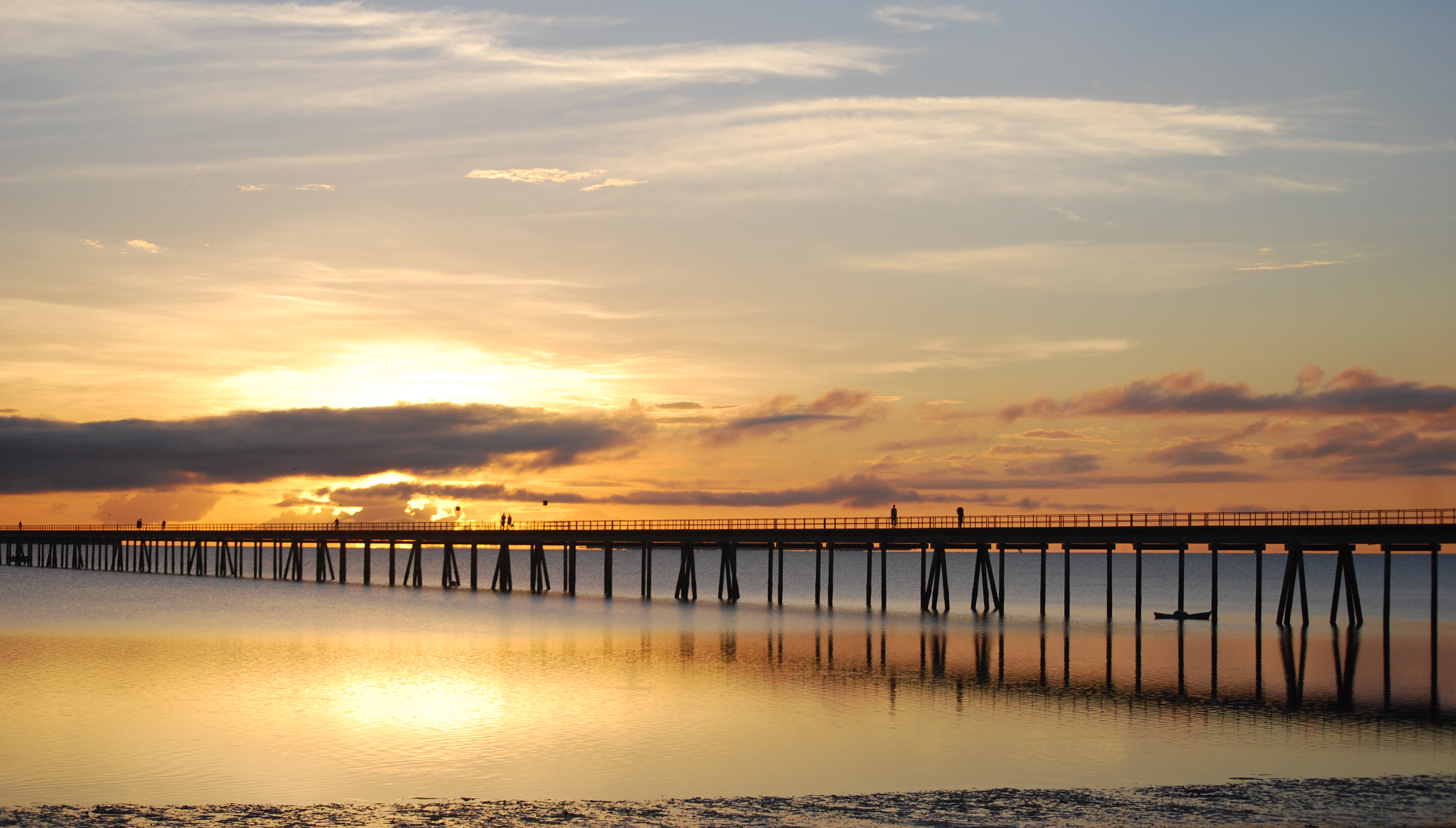
- Coordinates: 15°02′40″S 40°42′33″E
- Carries: 1 lane
- Crosses: Indian Ocean
- Locale: Island of Mozambique
- Maintained by: National Road Administration

Characteristics
- Material: Concrete bridge
- Total length: 3,390 metres (11,120 ft)

History
- Construction end: 1969

Location
- Interactive map of Mozambique Island Bridge

Mozambique Island Bridge is a bridge in Mozambique that connects the Island of Mozambique, the former capital of colonial Portuguese East Africa to the mainland over the Indian Ocean.

== History ==
In 1962, the government of Mozambique launched a tender for the construction of a 3,390 meter bridge to connect the Island of Mozambique to the mainland.

In July 2004, a construction to rehabilitate the bridge started with a $9-million budget.

A lighting system was installed on the bridge in 2013.

== Description ==
The western end of the bridge is on the mainland in Lumbo.

The Mozambique Island Bridge is a one-lane concrete bridge.

== See also ==
- List of longest bridges in the world
