= Chapel of Nossa Senhora de Baluarte =

Chapel in Mozambique

Coordinates: 15.0288°S 40.7449°E

The Chapel of Nossa Senhora de Baluarte is located on the most eastern tip of the Island of Mozambique within Stone Town. The island sits off the coast of Mozambique in Africa. The Chapel is situated outside the Fort São Sebastião from which it can be reached through a gate.

Built by the Portuguese in 1522, the chapel is considered to be the oldest European building in the Southern Hemisphere. It is also considered to be one of the finest examples of Manueline vaulted architecture in Mozambique.

== Gallery ==
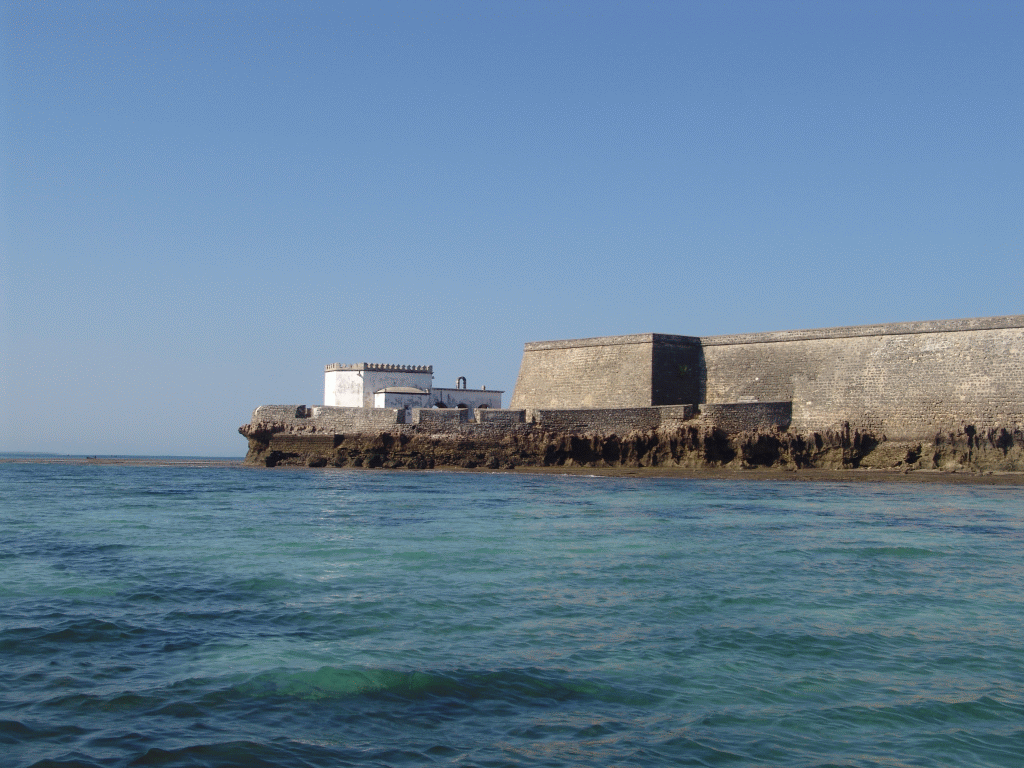
Chapel - Seaview

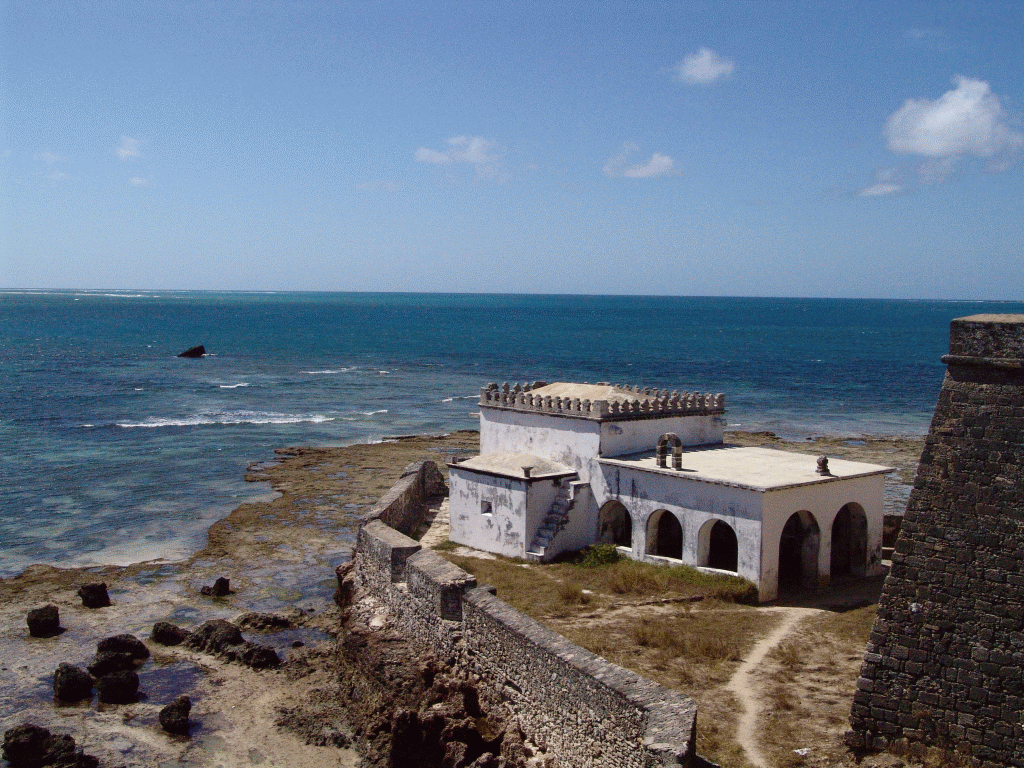
Chapel - View from Fort

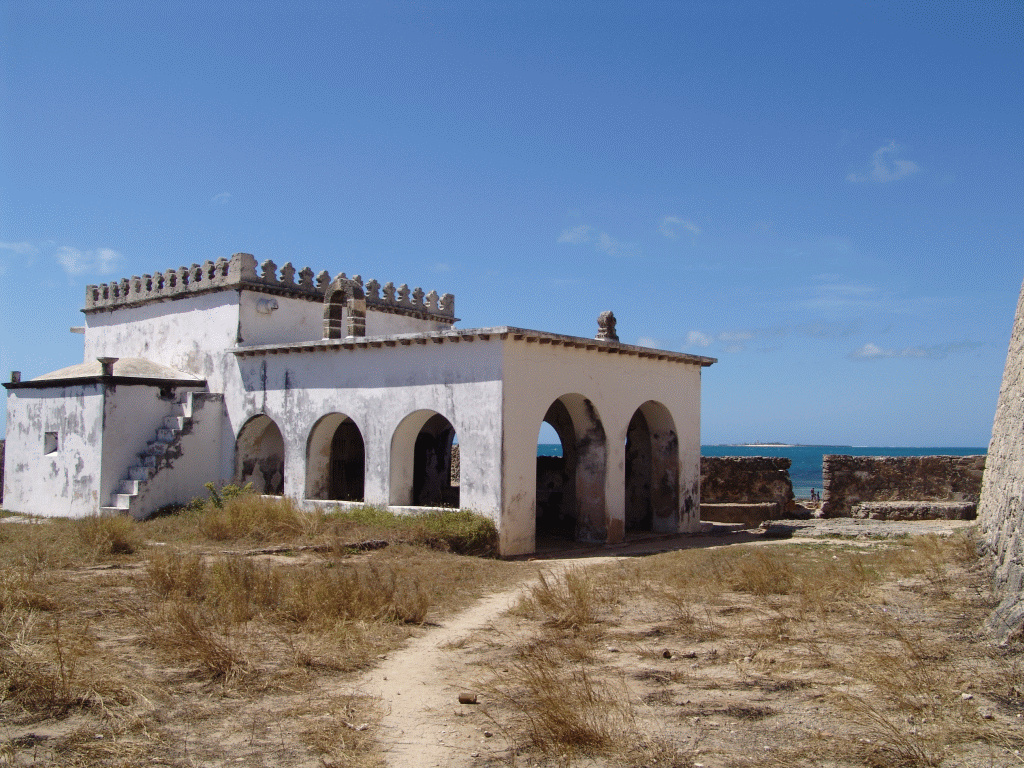
Chapel - Full View

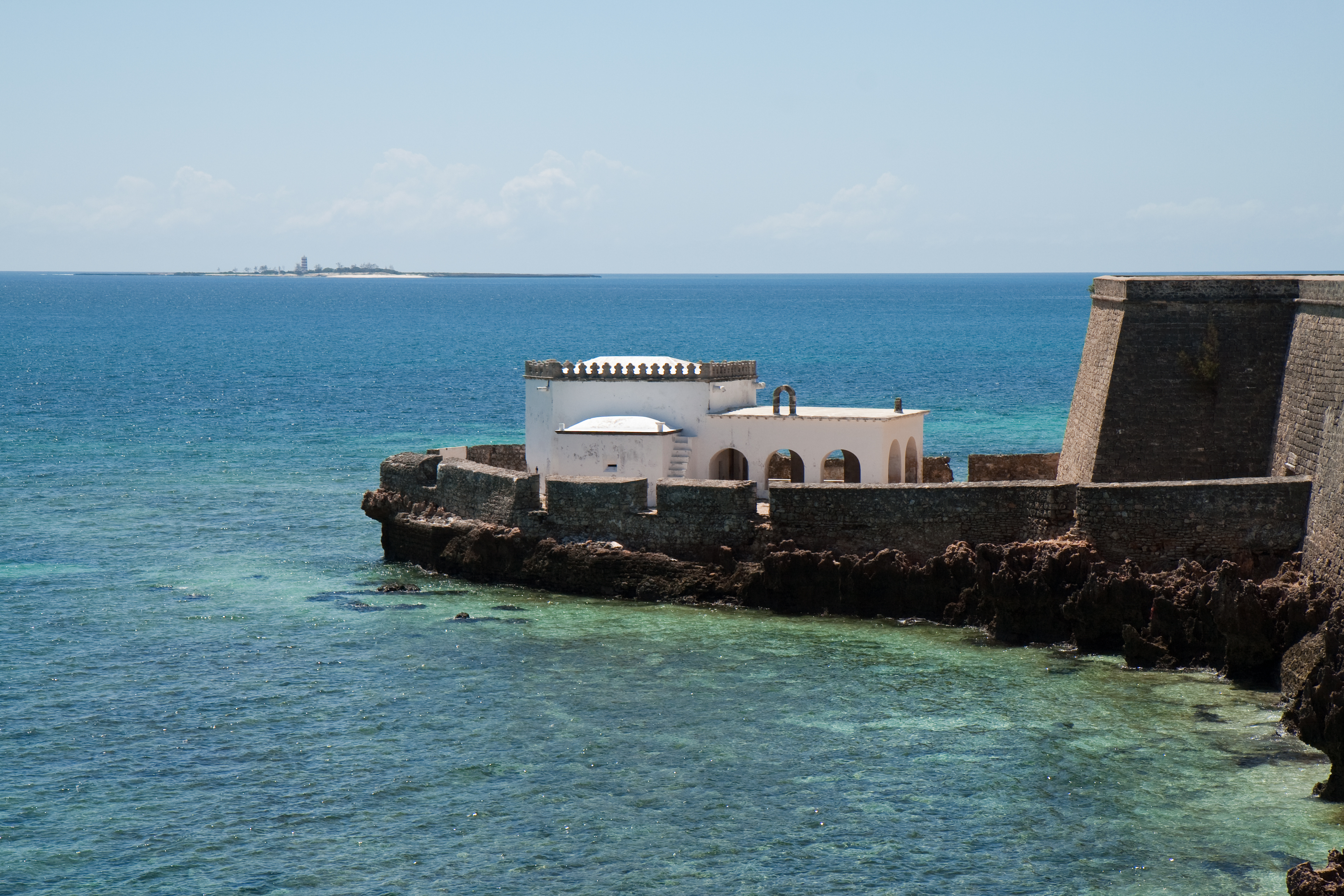
Chapel - View from Fort

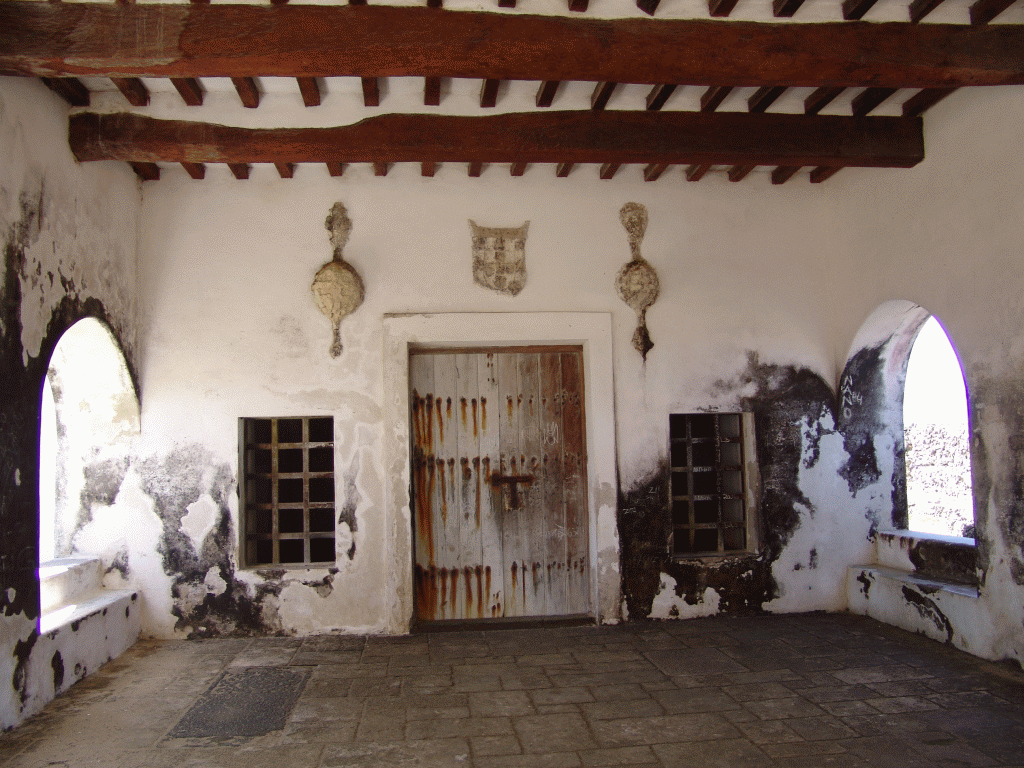
Chapel - Entrance

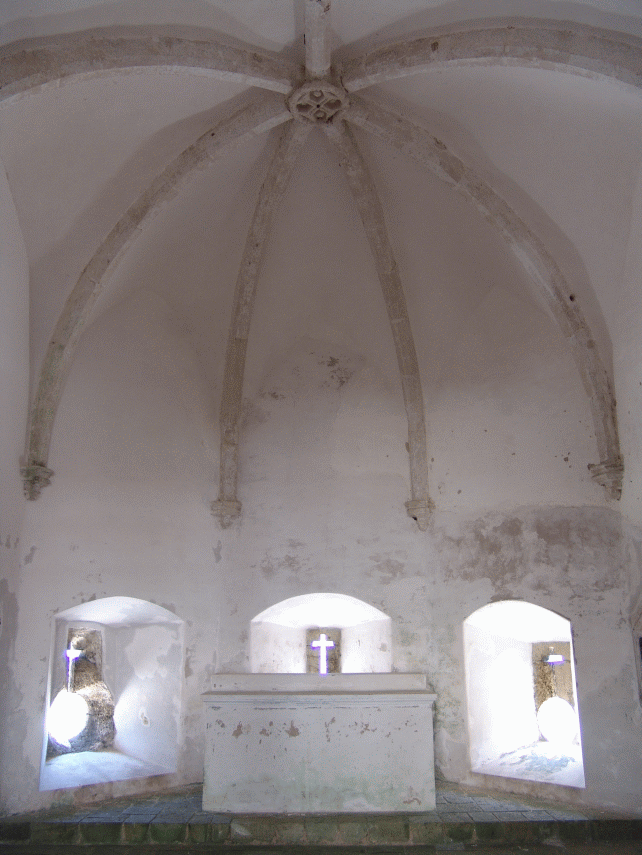
Chapel - Inside
