= Lumbo Airport =

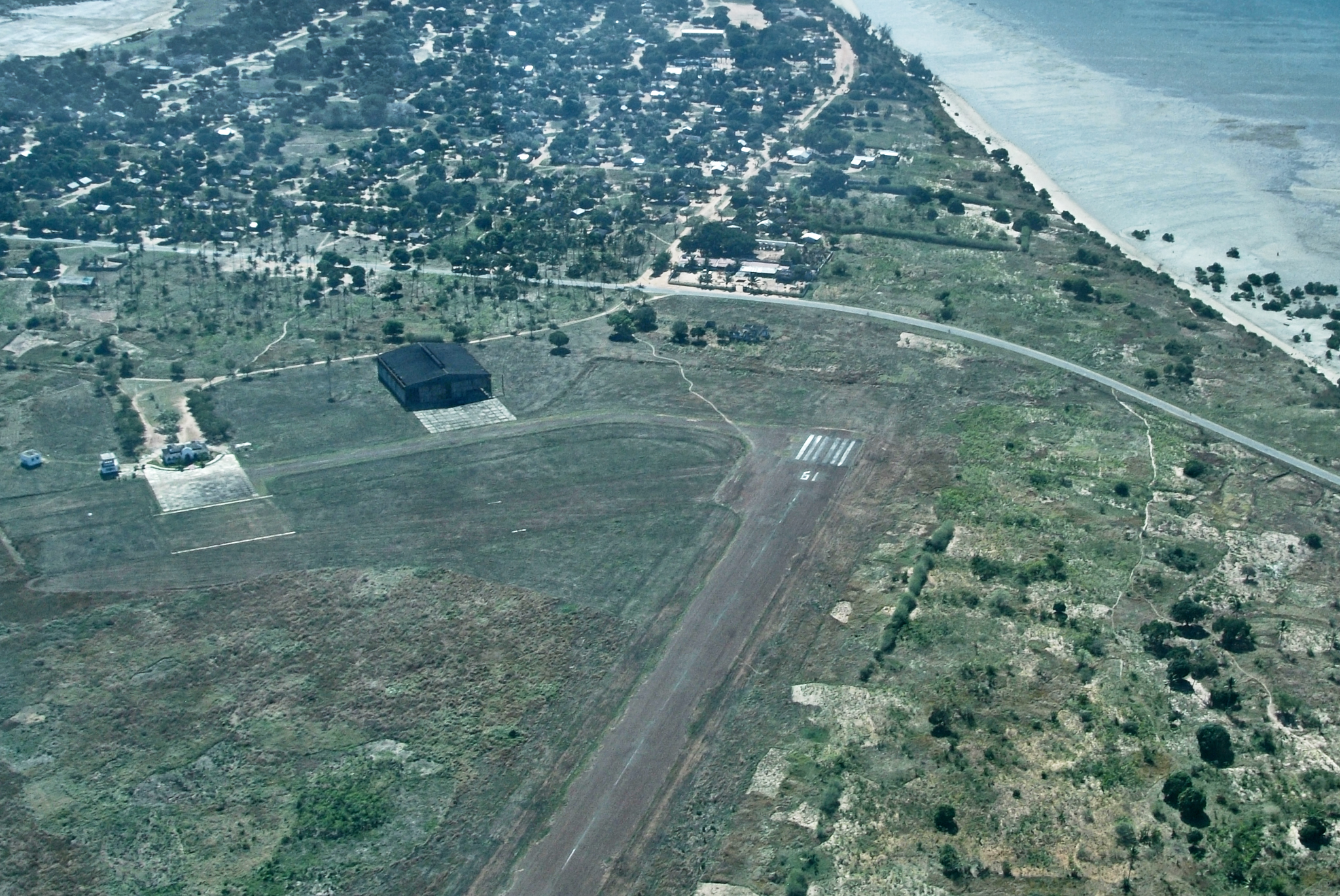
- IATA: LFB; ICAO: FQLU

Summary
- Airport type: Public
- Serves: Lumbo
- Elevation AMSL: 45 ft / 14 m
- Coordinates: 15°02′00″S 40°40′20″E

Map
- Location of the airport in Mozambique

Runways
Direction	Length		Surface
Direction	ft	m	Surface
01/19	4,117	1,255	Asphalt

Lumbo Airport (IATA: LFB, ICAO: FQLU) is an airport serving Lumbo, Mozambique and the island of Mozambique.

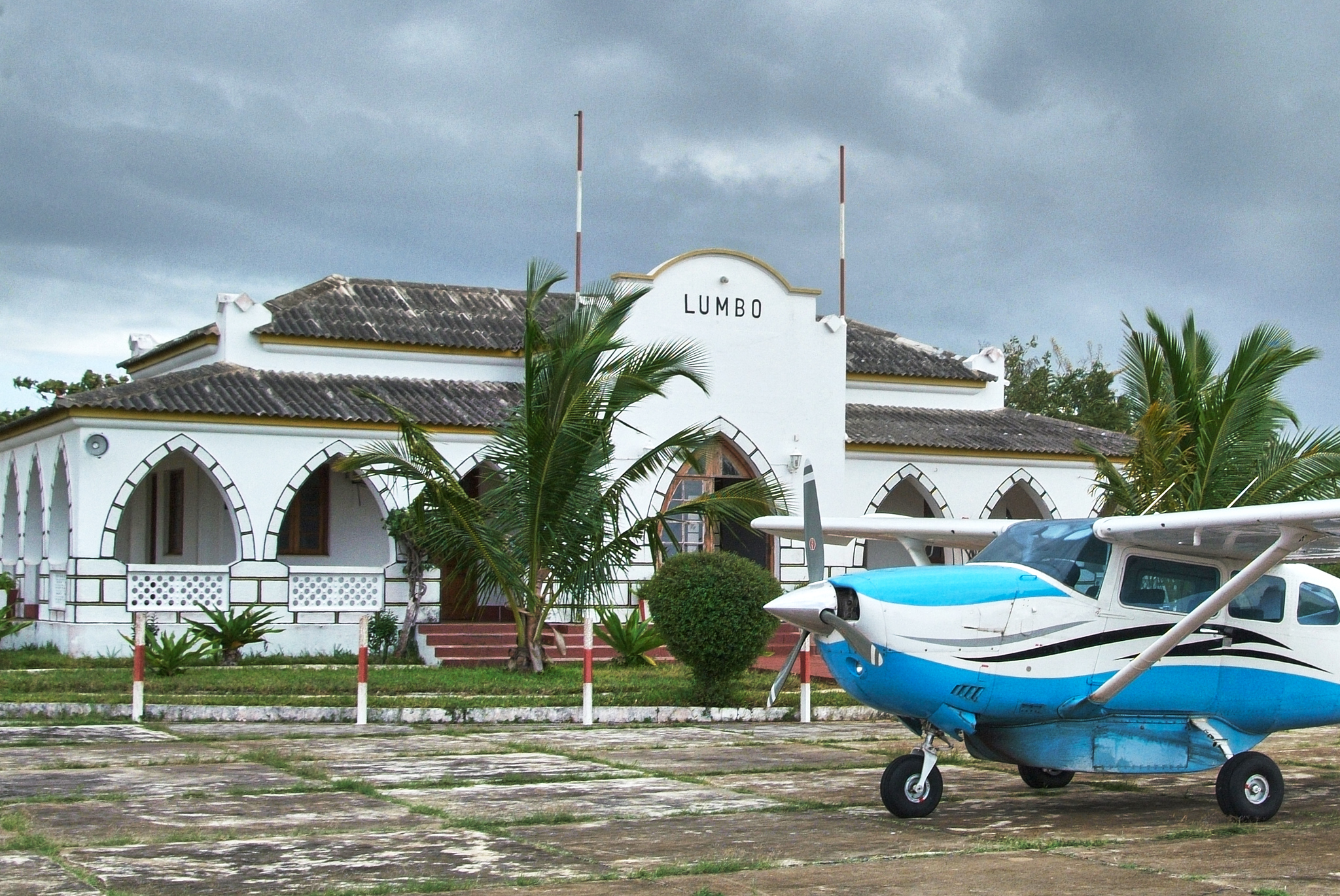

== See also ==
- Transport in Mozambique
