= Chocas Mar =

Beach in Nampula Province, Mozambique

- Beach
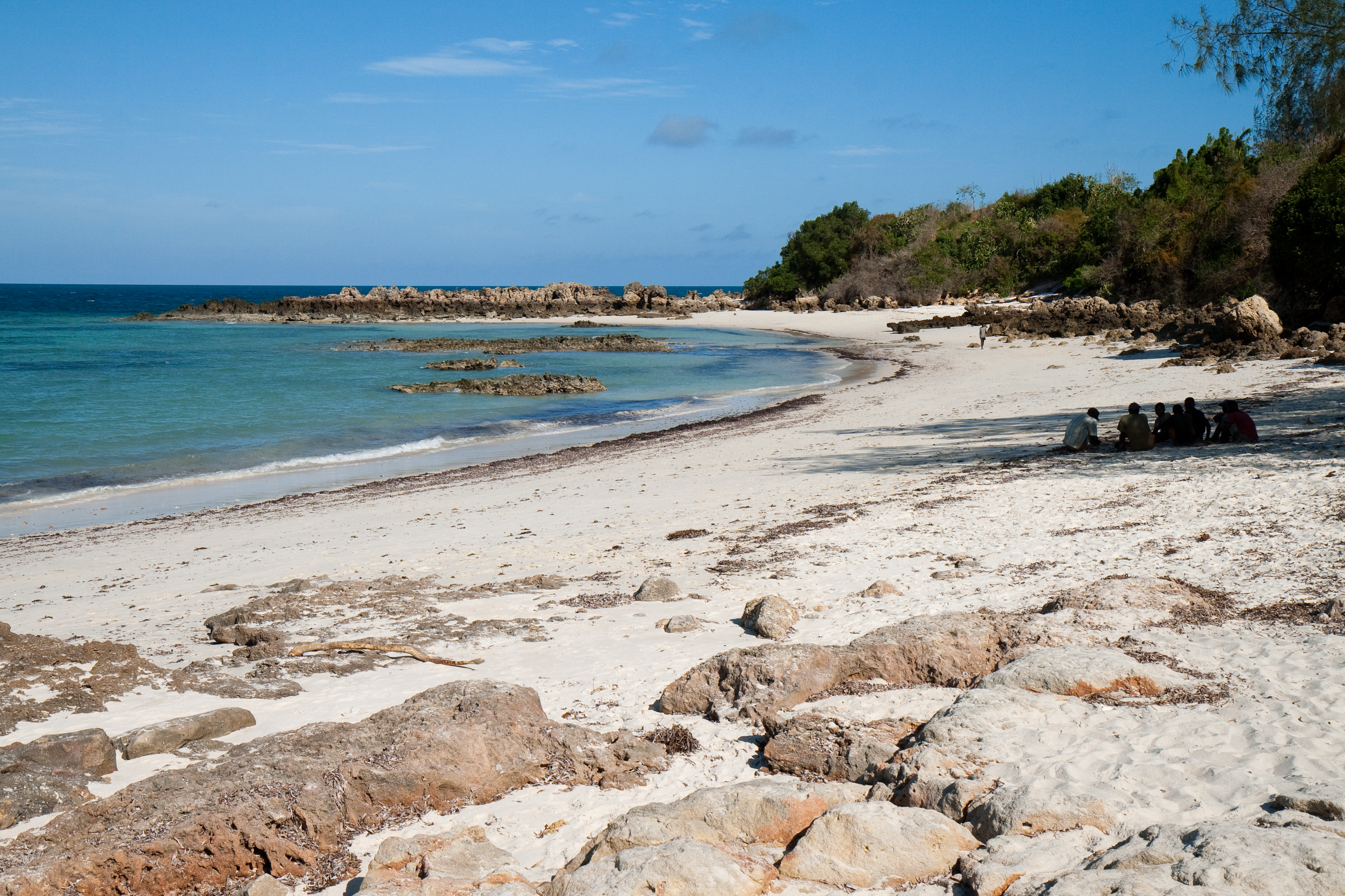
- Chocas Mar

- Location within Mozambique
- Coordinates: 14°56′6.86″S 40°44′14.62″E
- Location: Nampula Province, Mozambique
- Water bodies: Conducia Bay, Mossuril Bay, Indian Ocean

Chocas Mar is a long pristine beach in Nampula Province in Mozambique. It is about 40km north of the Island of Mozambique across the Mossuril Bay. Chocas Mar is accessible either by unpaved road or boat.
