= Cidade de Pedra, Mozambique =

Stone Town Cidade de Pedra
- Town
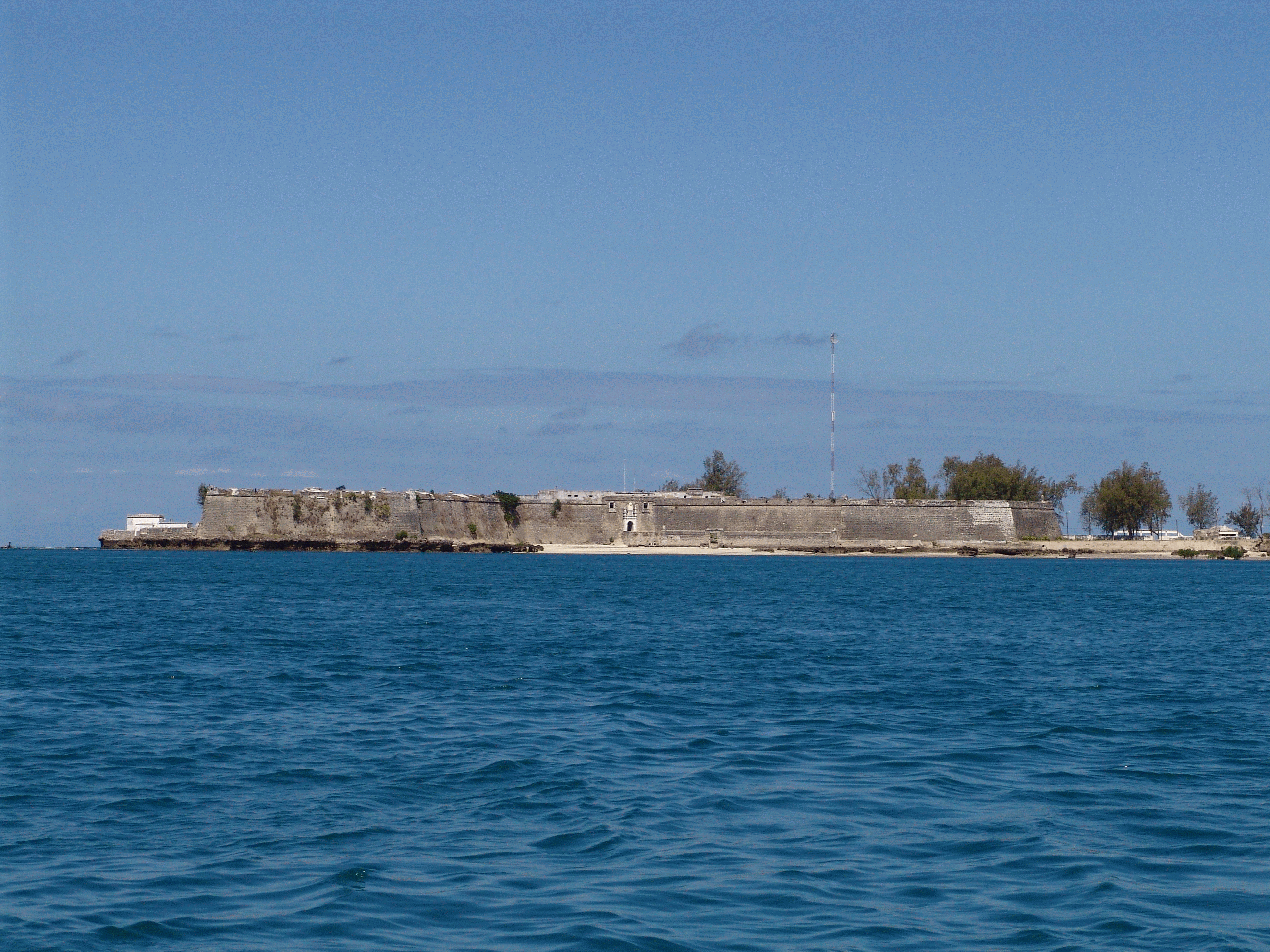
- The Fort São Sebastião (Mozambique) at the northern end of Stone Town

- Location within Mozambique
- Coordinates: 15°01′57″S 40°44′11″E
- Country: Mozambique
- Province: Nampula

Stone Town (Portuguese: Cidade de Pedra) is a town situated towards the northern end of the Island of Mozambique.

Pottery found on Mozambique Island indicates that the original town was founded no later than the fourteenth century. According to tradition, the original Swahili population came from Kilwa. The town's rulers had links with the rulers of both Angoche and Quelimane by the fifteenth century. In 1514, Duarte Barbosa noted that the town had a Muslim population and that they spoke the same Swahili dialect as Angoche.

Portugal established a trading fort in 1507. It was an important staging post on the maritime journey between Portugal and India. The Portuguese settlement (later known as Stone Town) was the capital of Portuguese East Africa, a distinction it held until 1898, when Lourenço Marques (now Maputo) became the capital.

Within Stone Town, the Chapel of Nossa Senhora de Baluarte and the Fort São Sebastião are two notable old buildings.

Between 2010 and 2015, Stone Town's neglected buildings and faded grandeur had been turned around with infrastructure improvements and building restorations.
