= Island of Mozambique =

Historically significant island off the northeastern coast of Mozambique

UNESCO World Heritage Site
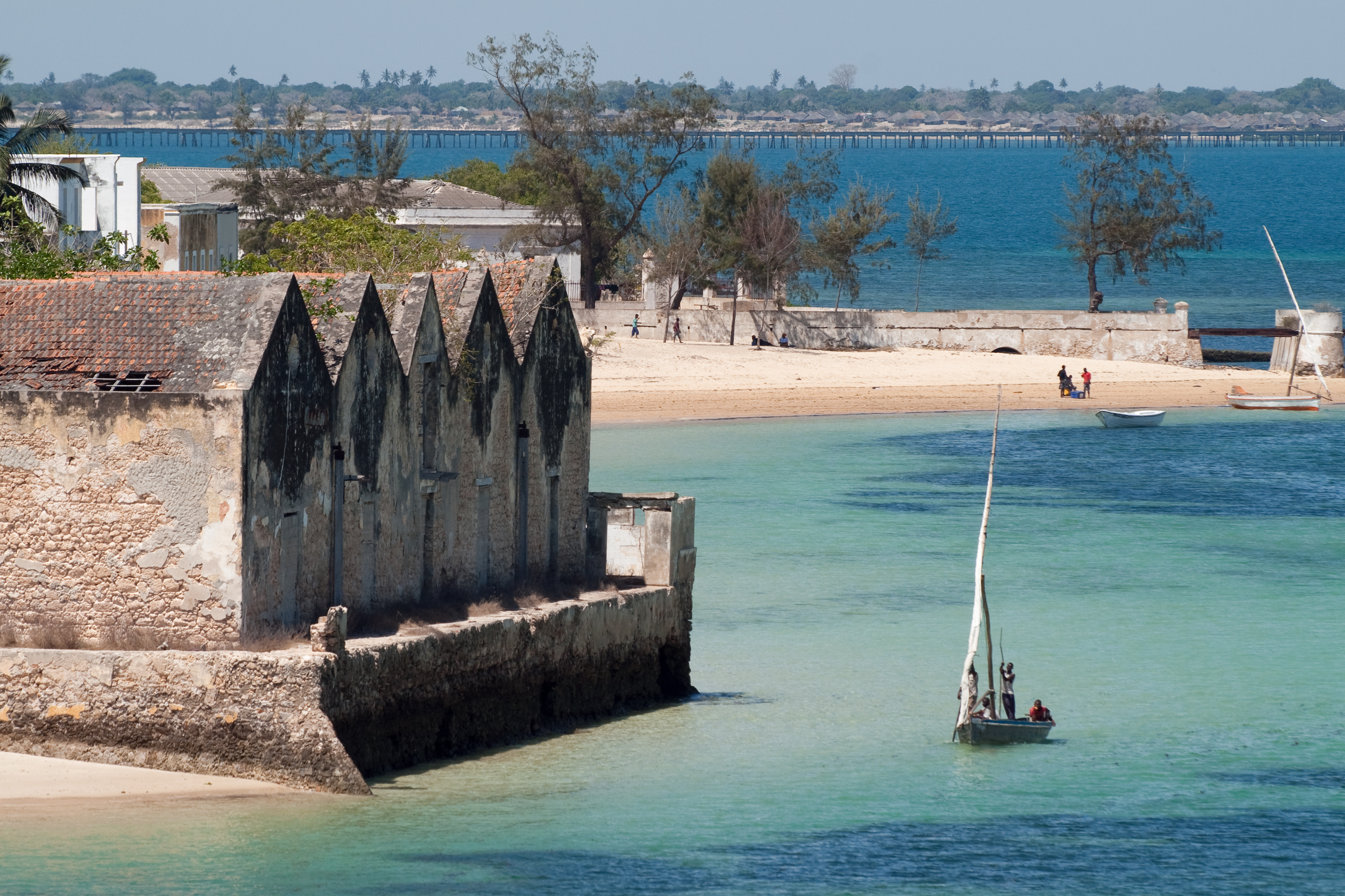
- The island of Mozambique seen from Fort São Sebastião (the bridge to the mainland stretches across the background)

- Location within Mozambique
- Location: Nampula Province, Mozambique
- Criteria: Cultural: (iv), (vi)
- Reference: 599
- Inscription: 1991 (15th Session)
- Coordinates: 15°02′12″S 40°43′58″E

The Island of Mozambique (Portuguese: Ilha de Moçambique) lies off northern Mozambique, between the Mozambique Channel and Mossuril Bay, and is part of Nampula Province. Prior to 1898, it was the capital of colonial Portuguese East Africa.

With its rich history and sandy beaches, the Island of Mozambique is a UNESCO World Heritage Site and one of Mozambique's fastest-growing tourist destinations. It has a permanent population of approximately 14,000 people and is served by nearby Lumbo Airport on the Nampula mainland. The name of the country was derived from the name of the island.

== History ==
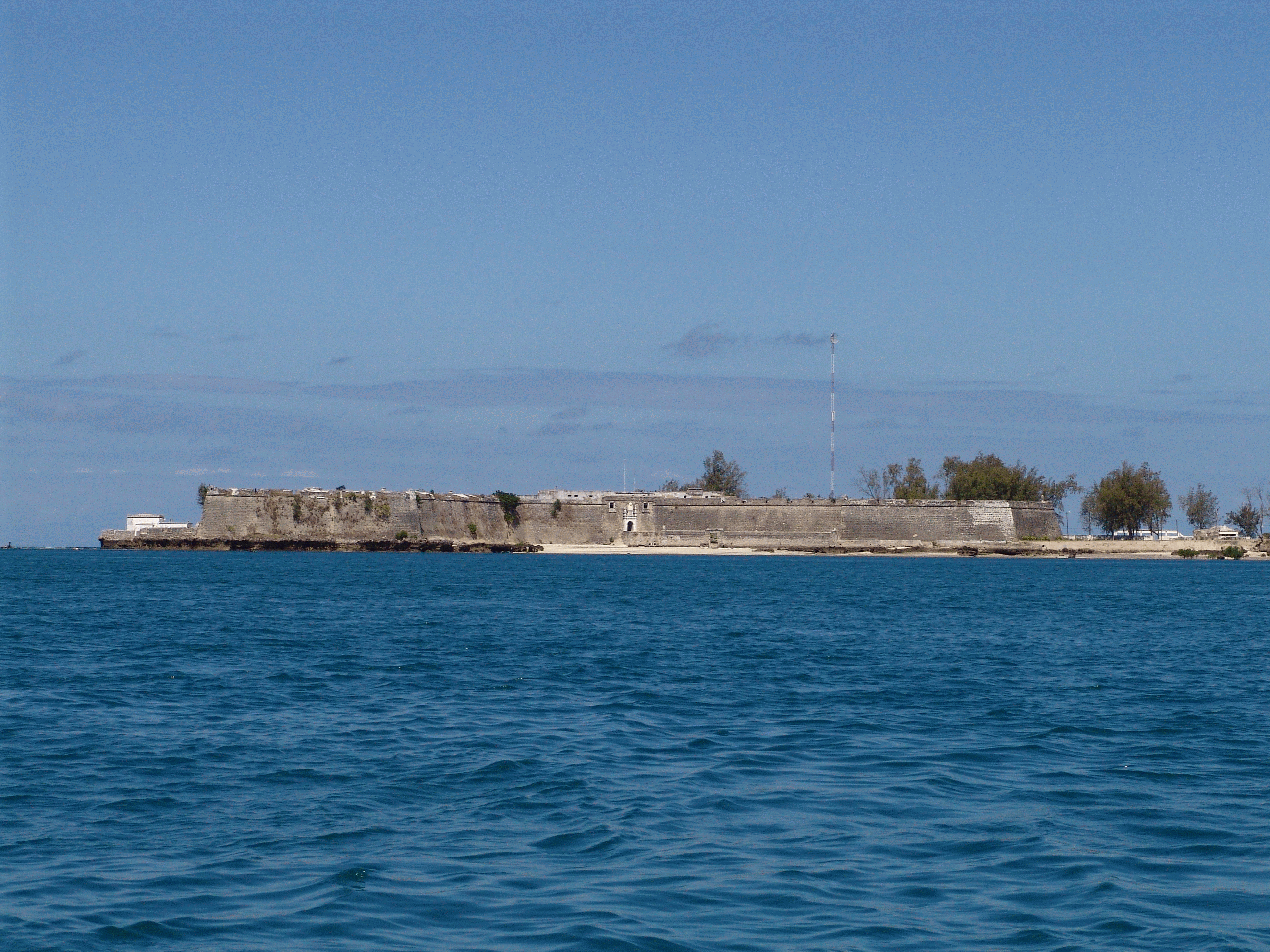
Fort São Sebastião

Pottery found on Mozambique Island indicates that the town was founded no later than the fourteenth century. According to tradition, the original Swahili population came from Kilwa. The town's rulers had links with the rulers of both Angoche and Quelimane by the fifteenth century. In 1514, Duarte Barbosa noted that the town had a Muslim population and that they spoke the same Swahili dialect as Angoche.

The name of the island (Portuguese: Moçambique, pronounced [musɐ̃ˈbiki]) is derived from Ali Musa Mbiki (Mussa Bin Bique), sultan of the island in the times of Vasco da Gama. This name was subsequently also used for the mainland country Mozambique, and Ilha de ... (Island of ...) was added to the island's name. The Portuguese established a port and naval base in 1507 and built the Chapel of Nossa Senhora de Baluarte in 1522, now considered the oldest European building in the Southern Hemisphere.

During the 16th century, Fort São Sebastião was built, and the Portuguese settlement (now known as Stone Town) became the capital of Portuguese East Africa. The island also became an important missionary centre. It withstood Dutch attacks in 1607 and 1608, in a successful defense led by captain-general Dom Estêvão de Ataíde, and remained a major post for the Portuguese on their trips to India. It saw the trading of slaves, spices, and gold.

Apart from the ancient fortifications, only half of the town is stone-built. The hospital, a majestic neo-classical building constructed in 1877 by the Portuguese, with a garden decorated with ponds and fountains, was repainted white after the Mozambican Civil War. For many years, it was the biggest hospital south of the Sahara.

With the opening of the Suez Canal, the island's fortunes waned. In 1898, the capital was moved to Lourenço Marques (now Maputo) on the mainland. By the middle of the 20th century, the new harbour of Nacala took most of the remaining business.

== Attractions ==
Other notable buildings on the island include the Palace and Chapel of São Paulo, built in 1640 as a Jesuit College and subsequently used as the Governor's Residence, now a museum; the Museum of Sacred Art, housed in the Church of the Misericórdia run by the House of Mercy, displaying an excellent Makonde crucifix; the Church of Santo António; the Church of the Misericórdia; and the Chapel of Nossa Senhora de Baluarte. The island, now entirely urbanised, is also home to several mosques and a Hindu temple. A 3 km bridge was erected in the 1960s to connect it to the mainland.

The island in itself is not large, about 3 km long and between 200 and 500 metres wide. Most historical buildings are at the island's northern end. The majority of the residents live in reed houses in Makuti Town at the southern end of the island.

== Gallery ==
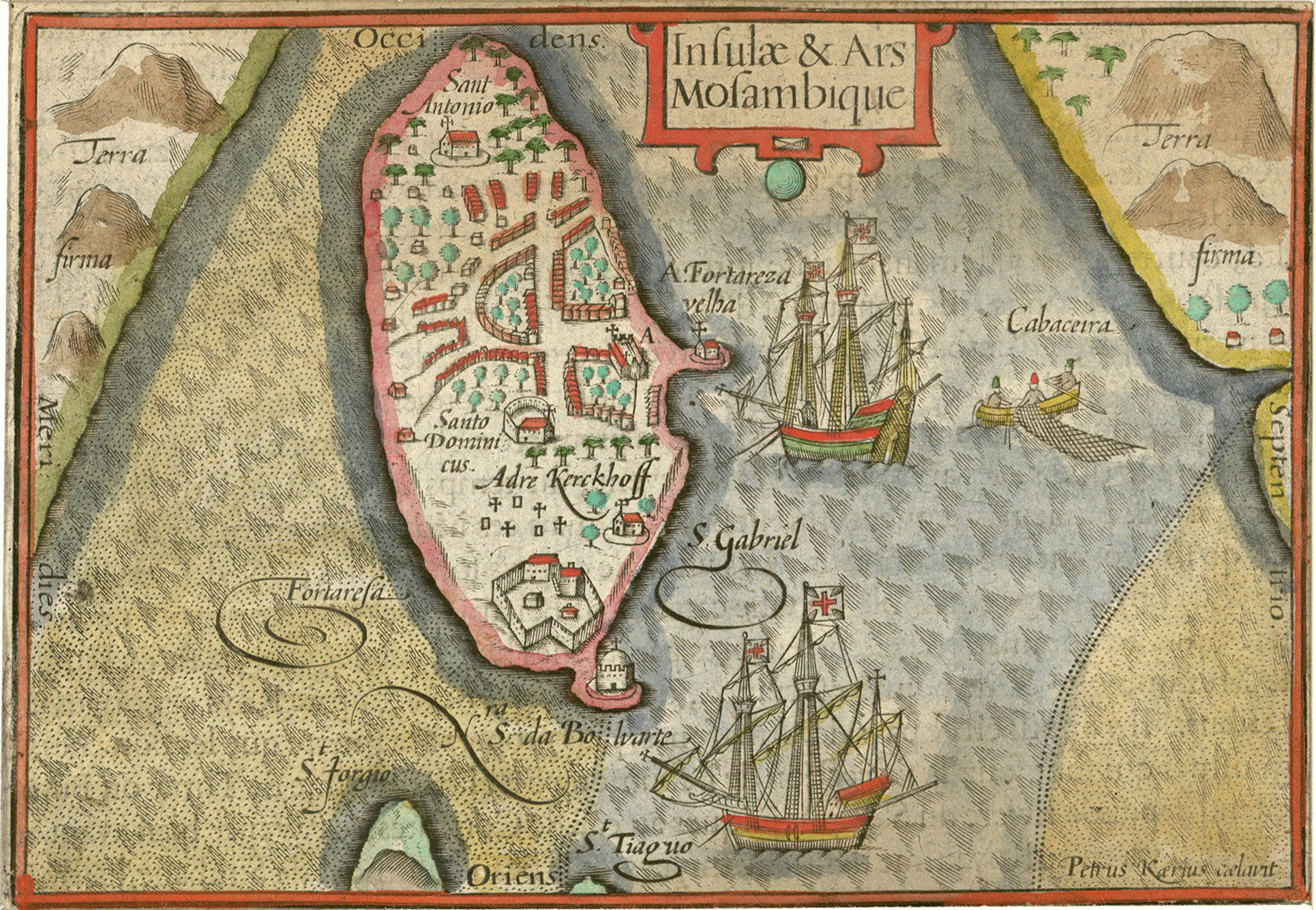
A map engraved by Pieter van den Keere in 1598

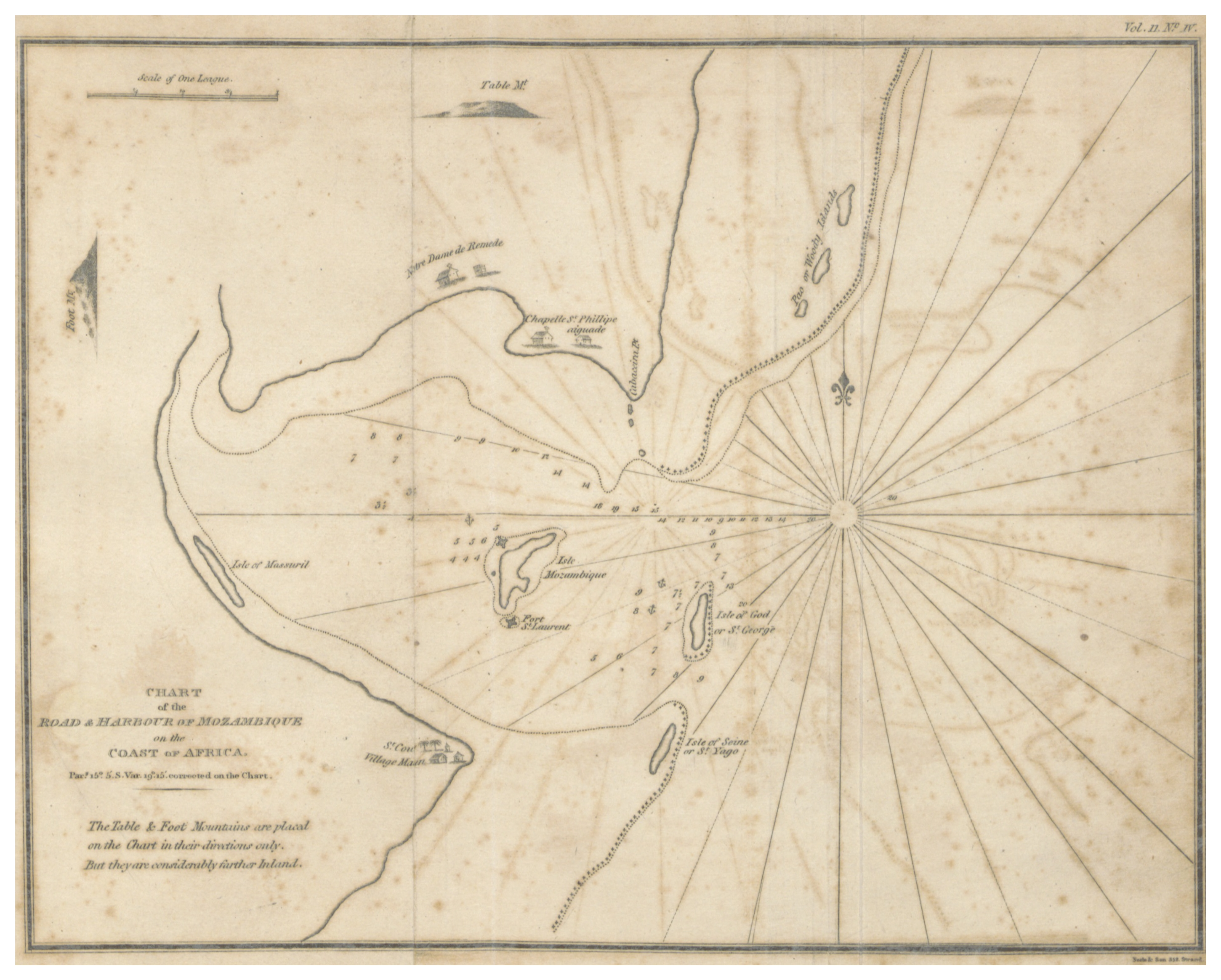
Chart of the Harbour in 1810

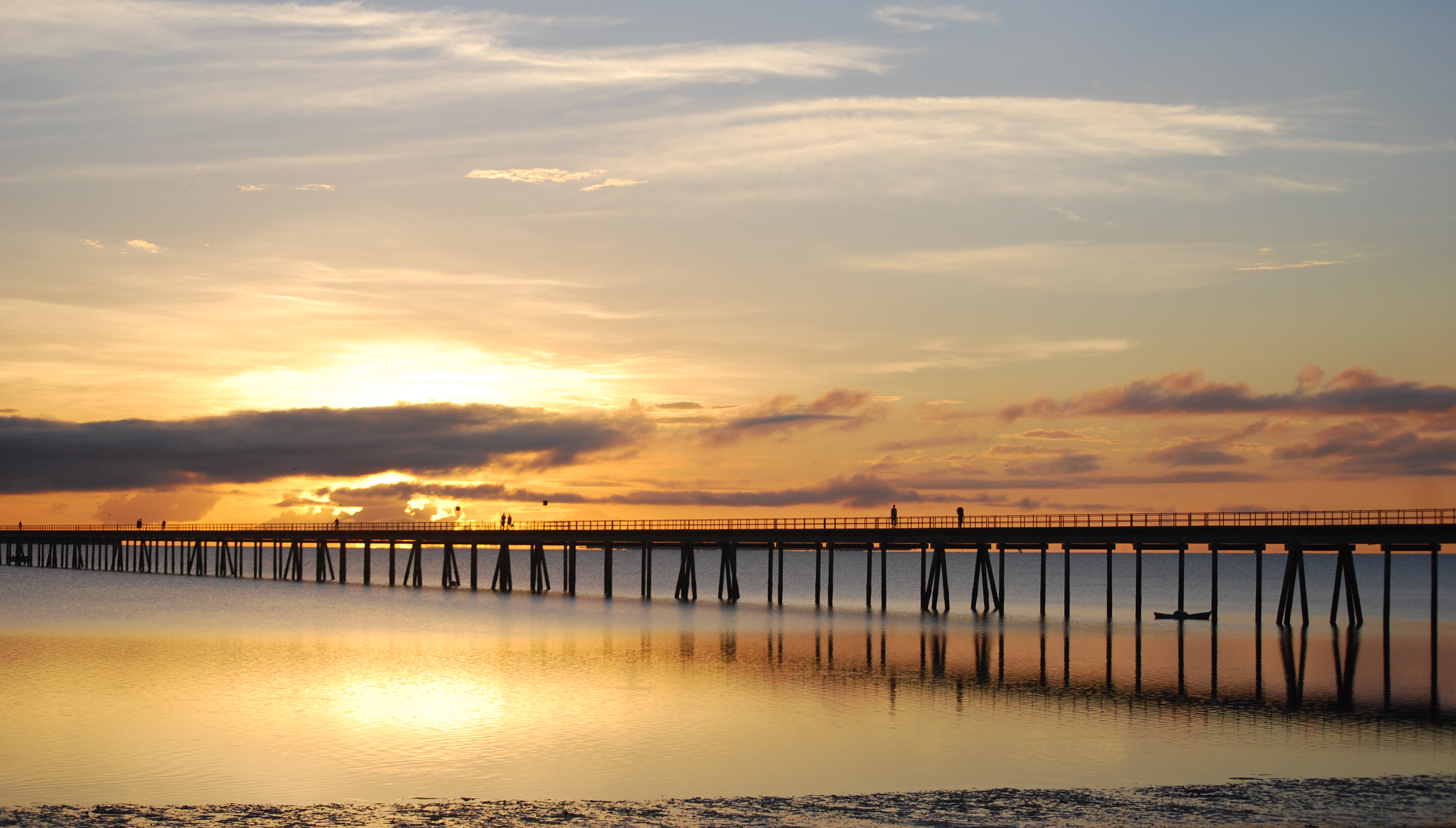
The 3.8-kilometre-long (2.4 mi) Mozambique Island Bridge

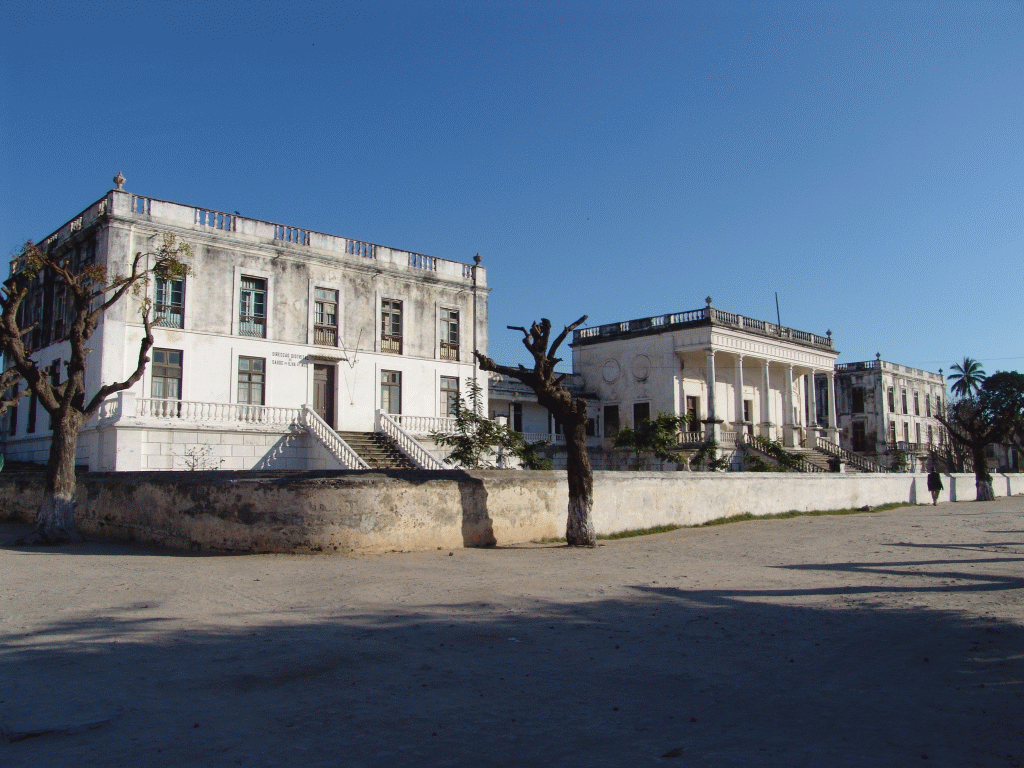
Old Hospital

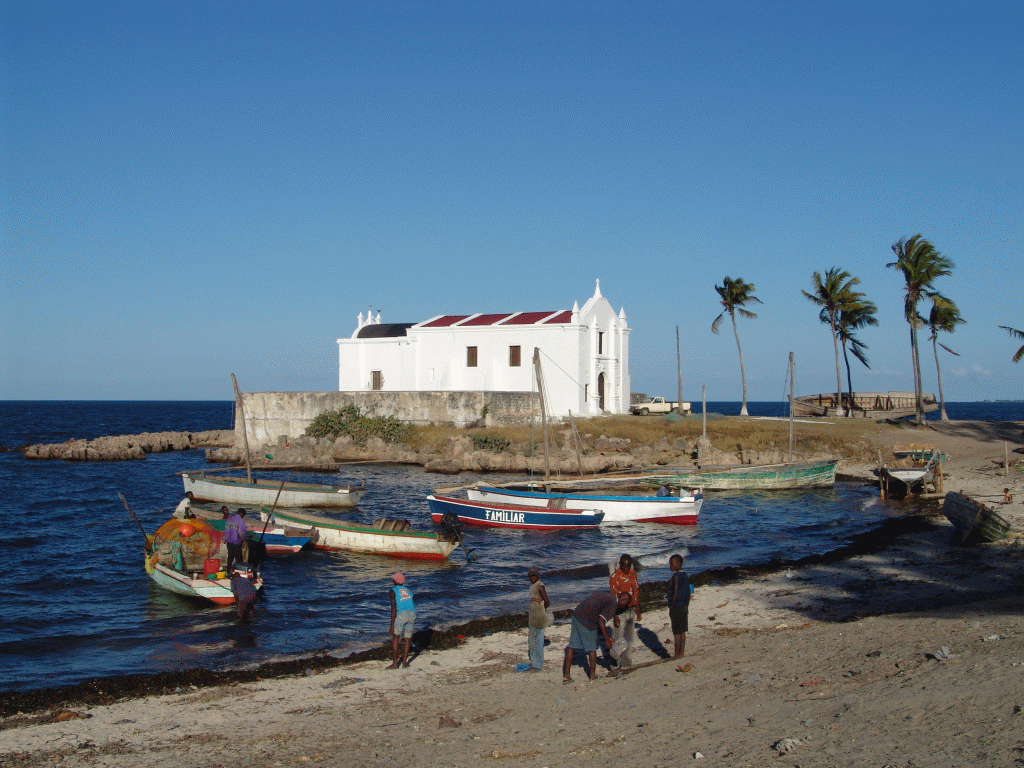
Church of Santo António

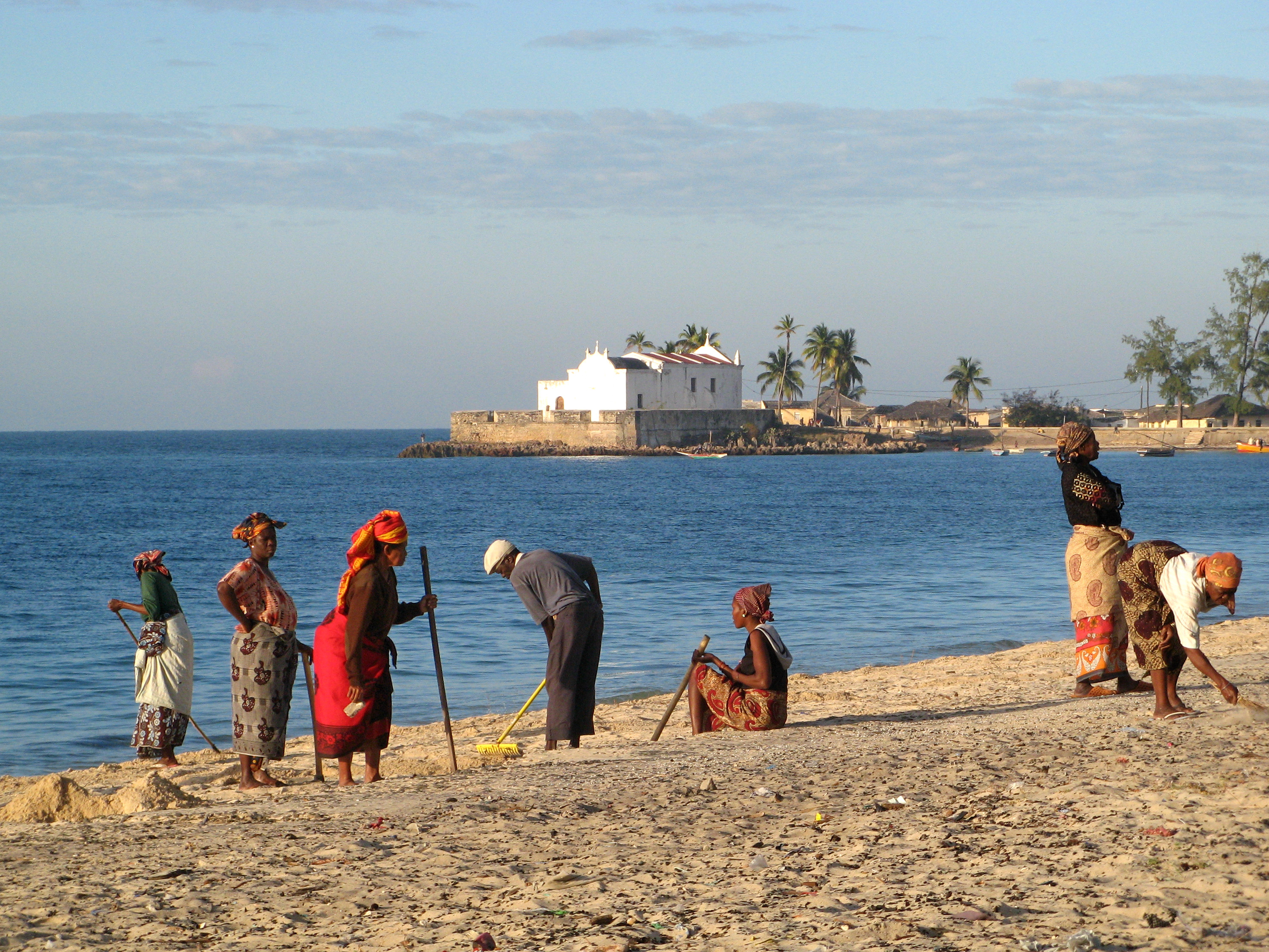
Beach cleaning

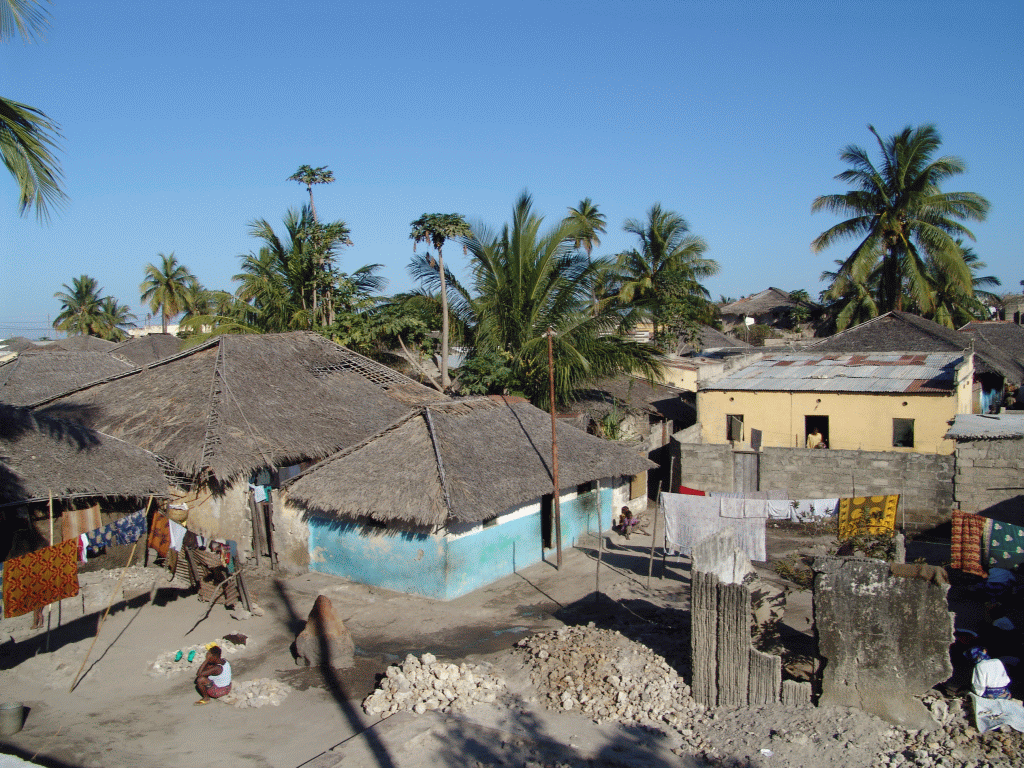
Makuti Town

The island is also close to two tourist highlights: Chocas Mar, a long beach about 40 km north of Ilha de Moçambique across the Mossuril Bay and Cabaceiras.

== See also ==
- List of Jesuit sites
- Goa Island (nearby)
