= Minquiers and Ecréhous =

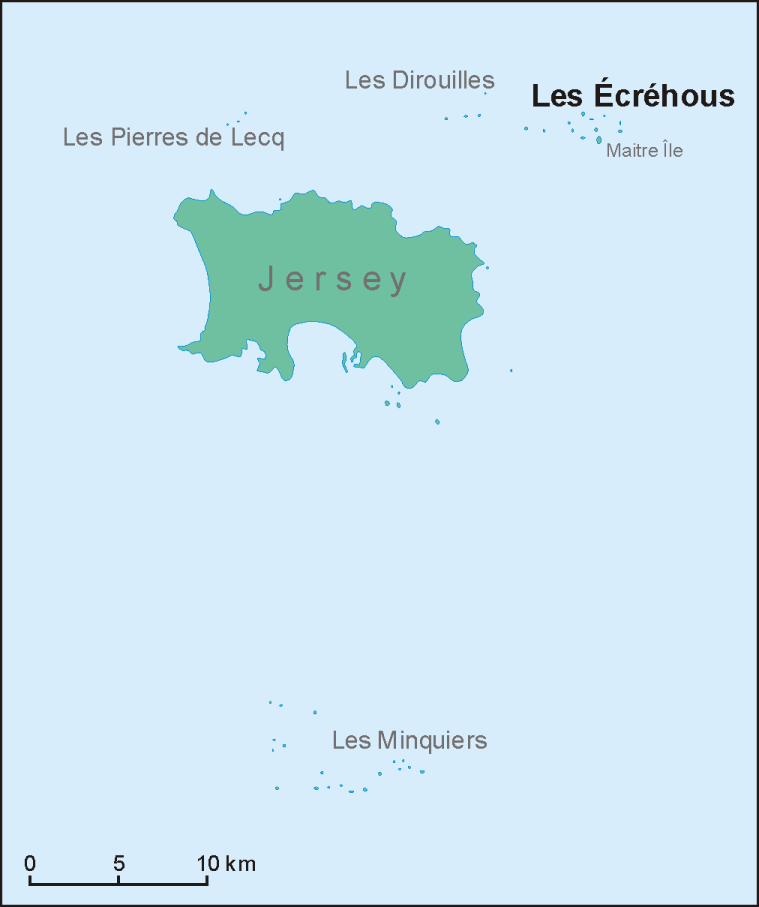
Location map showing Les Écréhous and Les Minquiers

The Minquiers and Ecréhous are two groups of islands and rocks forming part of the Bailiwick of Jersey, Channel Islands. They are respectively the most southerly and northerly land territories of the Bailiwick. The islands have no permanent inhabitants, and feature a few structures, primarily used by fishermen and seasonal visitors. The islands are noted for their role in a past international dispute between United Kingdom and France.

== History ==
The United Kingdom and France contended for the sovereignty of the Minquiers and Ecréhous, which became more prominent in the mid 20th century. The dispute was formally referred to the International Court of Justice (ICJ) in 1950 based on an understanding between the two nations. The United Kingdom claimed the islands stating that they were part of the territory of Jersey, and that it had consistently exercised legal and administrative jurisdiction over the islets. France led claim to the island based on the fishing rights in the waters surrounding the islands and the historic rule of Duchy of Normandy over the region. On 17 November 1953, the ICJ delivered its judgment, and upheld the British claim to the islands, based on the allegiance of the Channel Islands to the English Crown in 1204 after the dismemberment of the Duchy of Normandy.

== Geography ==
The Minquiers and Ecréhous are two distinct groups of small islands located within the Gulf of St Malo. The Minquiers (Les Minquiers) are situated about 20 km (12 mi) south of Jersey, and are administratively part of the Parish of Grouville. The Écréhous (Les Écréhous) are situated 9 km (5.6 mi) north-east of Jersey, and are administratively part of the Parish of St. Martin.

As these are low-lying islands made up of rocks and corals, only smaller rocky projections are visible above water at high tides. During lower tides, a larger expanse of the rock island reveals sandbanks and coastal plains. The visible area of Ecréhous varies between 0.2 to 41 km^{2} (0.077 to 15.830 sq mi) and the area of Minquiers varies between 0.1 to 100 km^{2} (0.039 to 38.610 sq mi) between tides. Archeological evidence suggests the islands were larger in the Neolithic period, and were occupied by humans, before raising sea-levels reduced the land area. The islands consist of granodiorite, and have been extensively mined in the past.

== Demographics ==
The Minquiers and Ecréhous have no permanent inhabitants. The small temporary structures typically support local fishermen, visitors, and researchers. The primary activity associated with these islets is fishing, and while within Jersey's territorial waters, commercial fishing in these areas is managed through the Bay of Granville Agreement, a treaty between Jersey and France. The islands have been designated as Ramsar sites and are part of the OSPAR Marine Protected Area network, and support significant marine biodiversity in their sensitive ecosystems.
