= Transport in Mozambique =

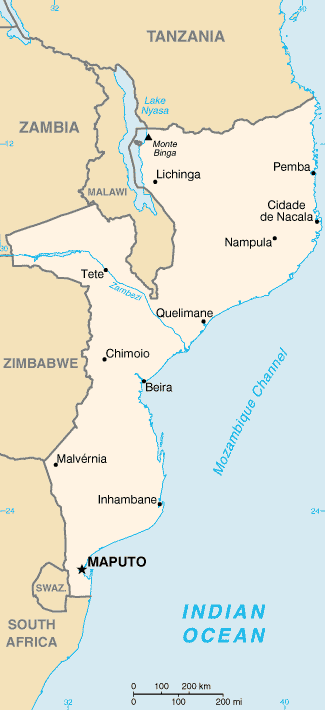

Modes of transport in Mozambique include rail, road, water, and air. There are rail links serving principal cities and connecting the country with Malawi, Zimbabwe and South Africa. There are over 30,000 km of roads, but much of the network is unpaved.

On the Indian Ocean coast are several large seaports, including Nacala, Beira and Maputo, with further ports being developed. There are 3,750 km of navigable inland waterways. There is an international airport at Maputo, 21 other paved airports, and over 100 with unpaved runways.

== Railways ==
Railway network of Mozambique

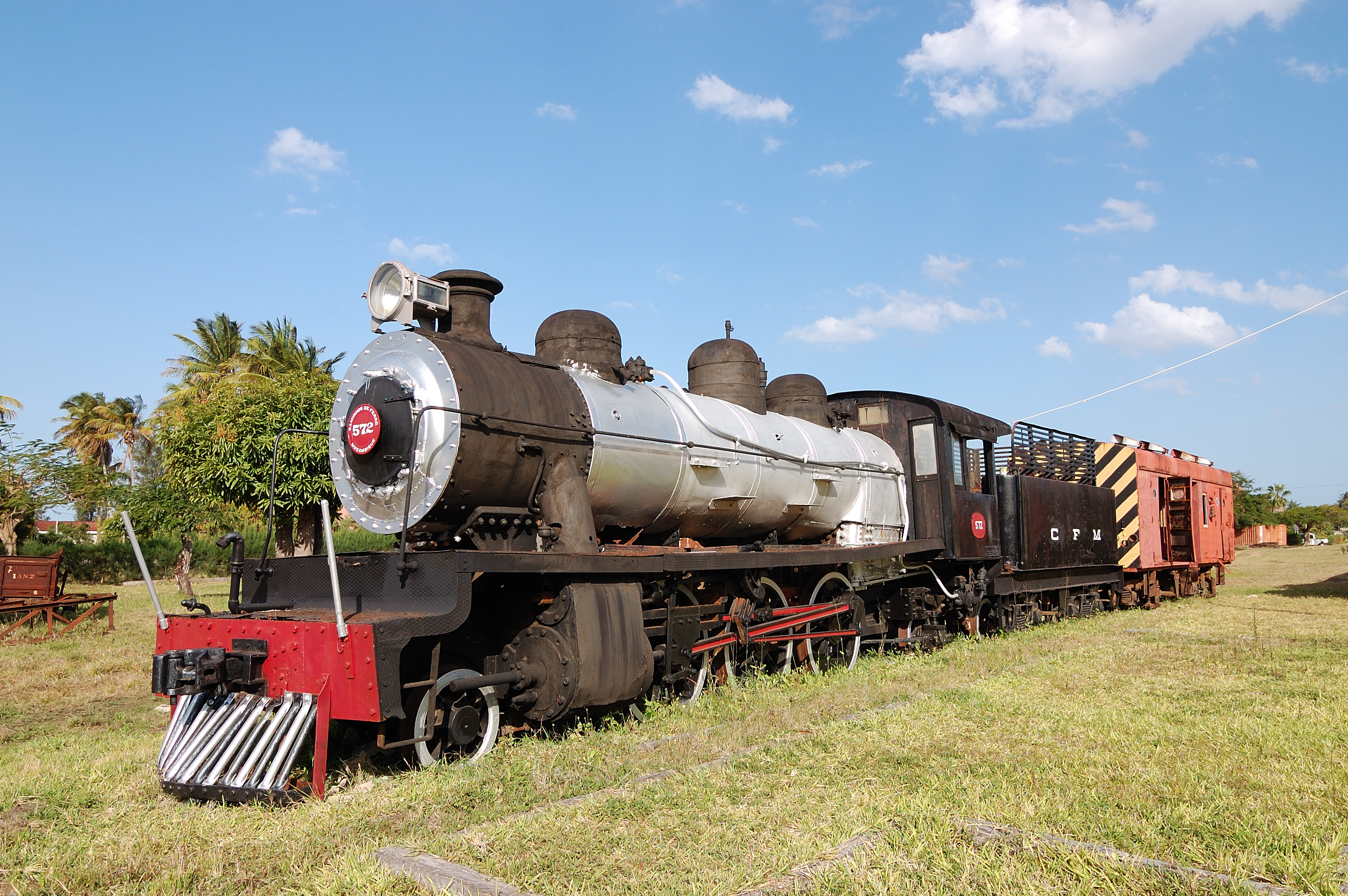
Steam locomotive at Inhambane, 2009

The Mozambican railway system developed over more than a century from three different ports on the Indian Ocean that serve as terminals for separate lines to the hinterland. The railroads were major targets during the Mozambican Civil War, were sabotaged by RENAMO, and are being rehabilitated. A parastatal authority, Portos e Caminhos de Ferro de Moçambique (abbreviated CFM; in English Mozambique Ports and Railways), oversees the railway system of Mozambique and its connected ports, but management has been largely outsourced. Each line has its own development corridor.

As of 2005 there are 3,123 km of railway track, consisting of 2,983 km of 1,067 mm (3 ft 6 in) gauge, compatible with neighboring rail systems, and a 140 km line of 762 mm (2 ft 6 in) gauge, the Gaza Railway. The central Beira-Bulawayo railway and Sena railway route links the port of Beira to the landlocked countries of Malawi, Zambia and Zimbabwe. To the north of this the port of Nacala is also linked by Nacala rail to Malawi, and to the south the port of Maputo is connected by the Limpopo rail, the Goba rail and the Ressano Garcia rail to Zimbabwe, Eswatini and South Africa.. These networks interconnect only via neighbouring countries. A new route for coal haulage between Tete and Beira was planned to come into service by 2010, and in August 2010, Mozambique and Botswana signed a memorandum of understanding to develop a 1,100 km railway through Zimbabwe, to carry coal from Serule in Botswana to a deepwater port at Techobanine Point in Mozambique.

Newer rolling stock has been supplied by the Indian Golden Rock and BLW, Varanasi workshop using Centre Buffer Couplers (AAR couplers) and air brakes.

== Roads and highways ==
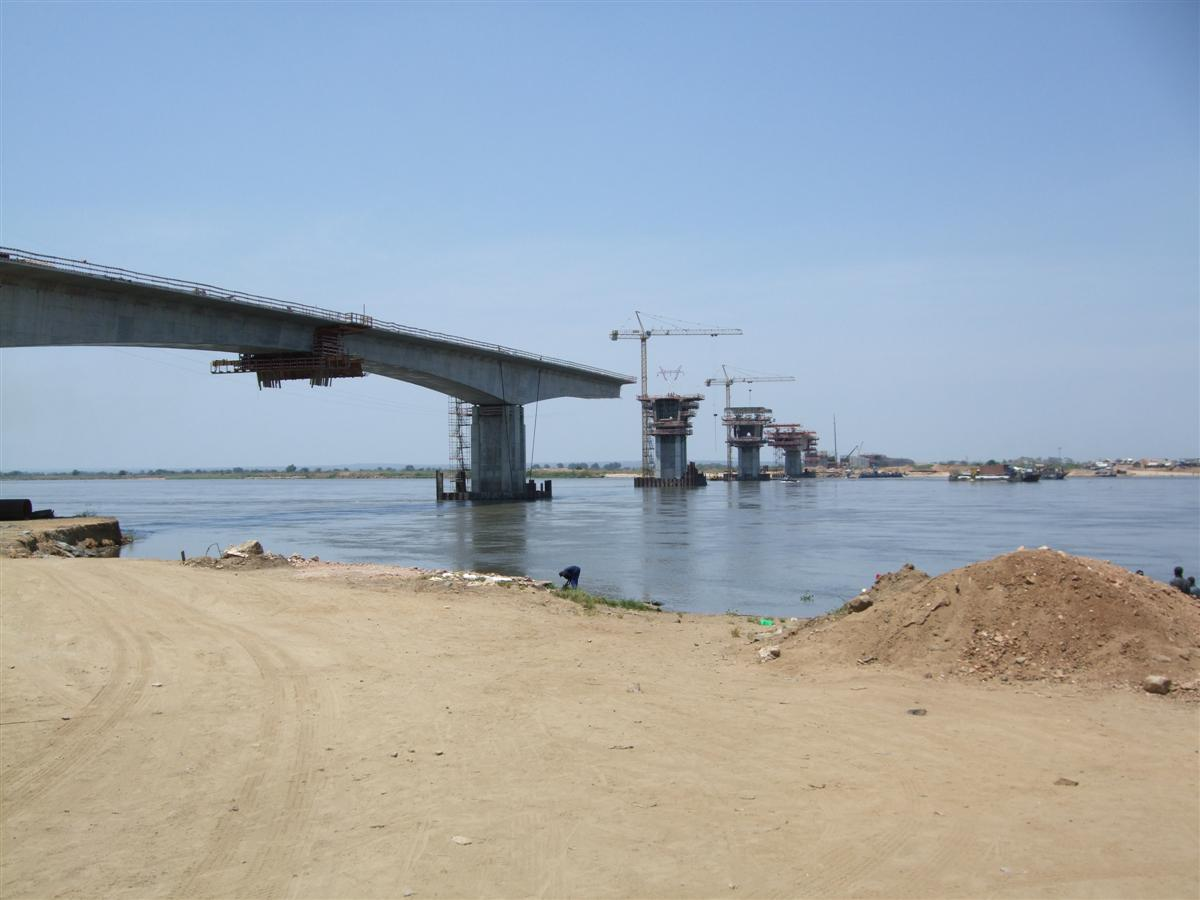
Construction works for the Armando Guebuza Bridge, Mozambique (2008)

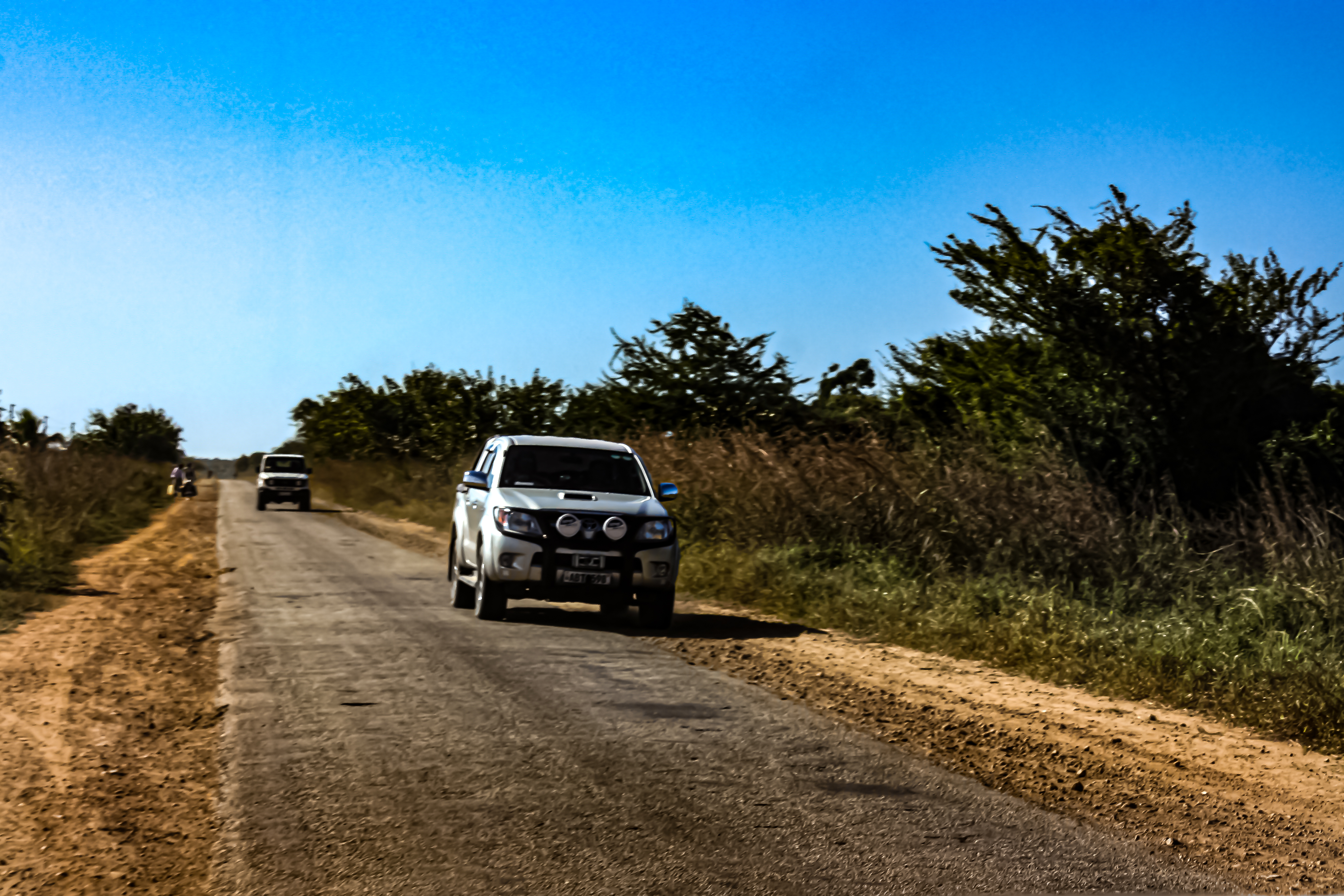
Road N1 (2010)

Mozambique's inter-city roads are classified as a national or primary road (estrada nacional or estrada primária), or as regional – secondary or tertiary – roads (estradas secundárias and estradas terciáreas). National roads are given the prefix "N" or "EN" followed by a one- or two-digit number. The numbers generally increase from the south of the country to the north. Regional roads are given the prefix "R", followed by a three-digit number.

In 2008 the total length of Mozambique's road network was 32,500 km. The primary and secondary road networks were less than 5000 km each. The tertiary network was 12,700 km. Unclassified or local roads (estradas vicinais) were estimated at 6,700 km, and urban roads at 3,300 km.

The national highway network includes 14 routes:

- N1 (EN1). Maputo – Xai-Xai – N5 junction – Maxixe – Inchope (N6 junction) – Gorongosa – Caia – N10 junction – Mocuba (N11 junction) – Nampula (N13 junction) – Mocuba (N11 junction) – Namialo (N12 junction) – Pemba
- N2 (EN2). Maputo – Matola – N3 junction – Namaacha border post (to eSwatini)
- N3 (EN3). N2 junction – Goba border post (to eSwatini)
- N4 (EN4). Maputo – Komatipoort border post (to South Africa)
- N5 (EN5). N1 junction – Inhambane
- N6 (EN6). Beira – Inchope (N1 junction) – Chimoio – N7 junction – Manica – Machipanda border post (to Zimbabwe). The N6 Highway is part of the Beira–Lobito Highway, Highway 9 in the Trans-African Highway network.
- N7 (EN7). N6 junction – Catandica – Changara District (N8 junction) – Tete (N9 junction) – Zobue border post (to Malawi)
- N8 (EN8). Changara District (N7 junction) – Nyamapanda border post (to Zimbabwe)
- N9 (EN9). Tete (N6 junction) – Chimefusa border post (to Zambia)
- N10 (EN10). N1 junction – Quelimane
- N11 (EN11). Mocuba (N1 junction) – Milange border post (to Malawi)
- N12 (EN12). Namialo (N1 junction) – Monapo – Nacala
- N13 (EN13). Nampula (N1 junction) – Ribaue – Cuamba – Mandimba border post (to Malawi) – Lichinga (N14 junction)
- N14 (EN14). Metoro (N1 junction) – Montepuez – Cassembe – Lichinga (N13 junction)

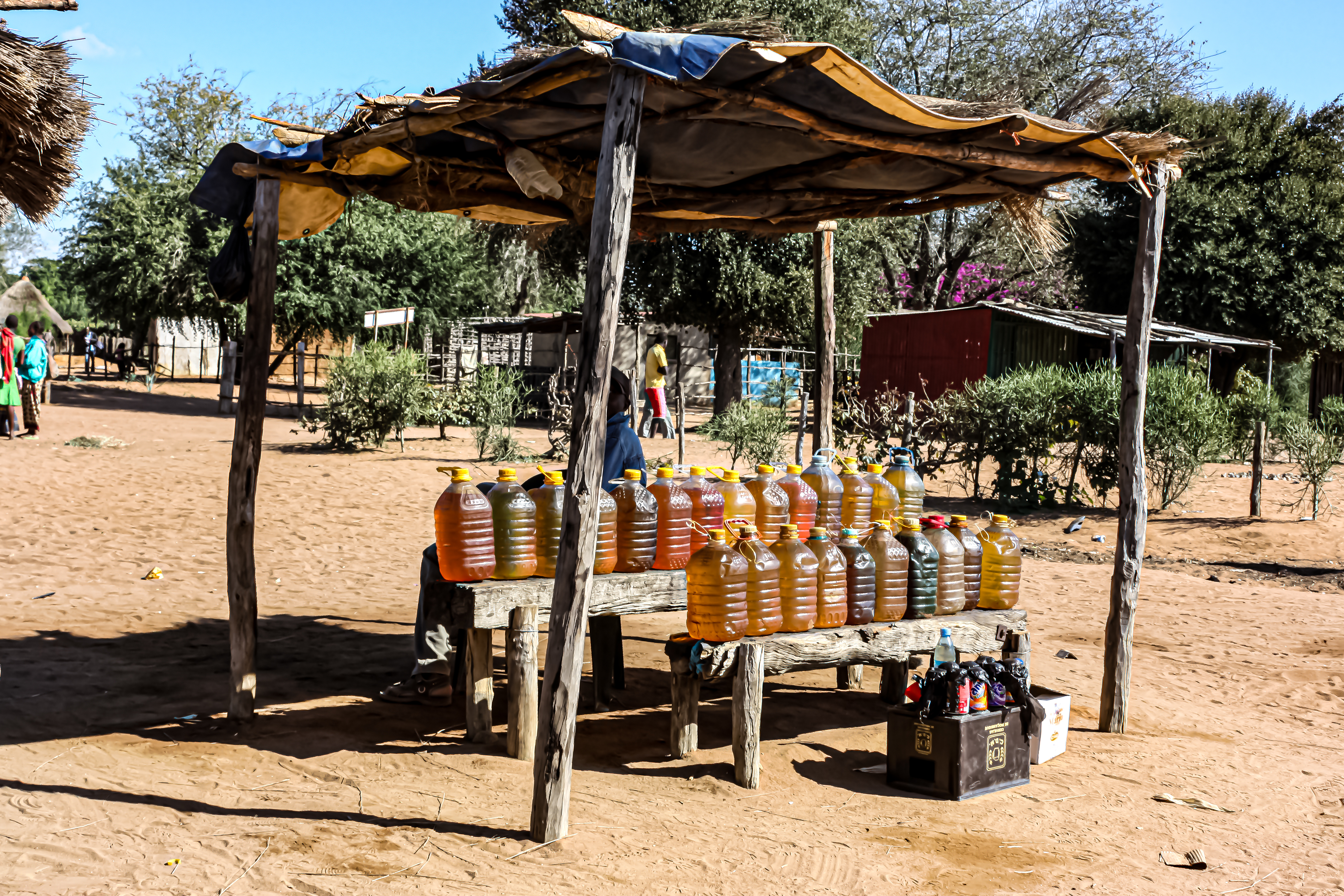
Petrol station in Gaza Province.

== Waterways ==
There are 3,750 km of navigable waterways.

== Sea transport ==
=== Ports and harbours ===
Seaports on the Indian Ocean coast include:

- Beira - railhead for Zimbabwe (via the Beira-Bulawayo railway) and Malawi (via the Sena railway)
- Inhambane
- Maputo - railhead for South Africa (via the Pretoria-Maputo railway), Eswatini (via the Goba railway) and Zimbabwe (via the Limpopo railway)
- Nacala - a deepwater port and a railhead for Malawi (via the Nacala railway).
- Pemba
- Quelimane
- Matutuine, a new coal port in the far south, approved October 2009.

=== Merchant marine ===
As of 2002 the merchant marine fleet consisted of three cargo ships of 1,000 gt or over, totaling 4,125 gt/7,024 tonnes deadweight (DWT). Two of these were Belgian-owned ships registered in Mozambique as a flag of convenience.

== Airports ==
As of 2006 there were 158 airports in total, 22 of them having paved runways. The main airport in the country is Maputo International Airport, which is also the hub of Mozambique's flag carrier, LAM Mozambique Airlines.
