= Port of Maputo =

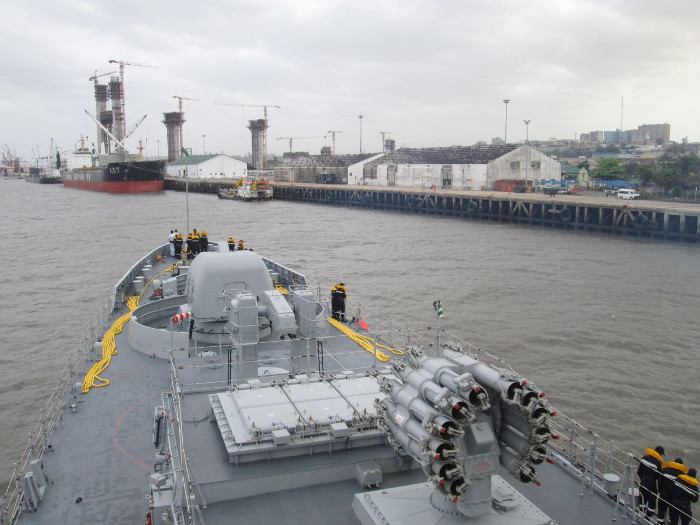
- Interactive map of Port of Maputo

Location
- Country: Mozambique
- Location: Maputo; Matola
- Coordinates: 25°57′S 32°32′E
- UN/LOCODE: MZMPM

Details
- Opened: 1544; 482 years ago
- Operated by: MPDC
- Type of Harbor: Artificial

Statistics
- 2023 World Bank Container Port Performance Index: 317 (out of 405)
- Website www.portmaputo.com

The Port of Maputo, also called the Maputo-Matola port complex, is a Mozambican port located in the cities of Maputo and Matola. They are installed in Maputo Bay, on the north bank of the Espírito Santo estuary, which is separated from the Mozambique Channel by the islands of Inhaca and Portugueses and by the Machangulo peninsula.

The port belongs to the Mozambican government, which is responsible for its administration through the public-private joint venture "Maputo Port Development Company" (MPDC). It is a partnership among the Mozambique Ports and Railways (CFM), Dubai-based DP World, and Grindrod Ltd, a South African holding company. The company was hired in 2003 by the government of Mozambique and functions as port operator and port authority, directing shipping, port maintenance, security, cargo terminal management, and future development planning. Major port operator Dubai Ports World has invested in the company and its 15‑year government concession.

The port is the terminal for three railway lines — Goba, Limpopo and Ressano Garcia — transporting products from South Africa, Eswatini and Zimbabwe. It is a part of the logistics complexes of the Maputo Corridor, the Limpopo Corridor and the Libombo Corridor.

The port was founded in 1544. It received berth and quay structures in 1850, when it became known as Port of Lourenço Marques and Port of Delagoa Bay.

== History ==
The Port of Maputo had been a busy hub much before the establishment of the Maputo Port Development Company (MPDC); in 1972, it was handling close to 17 million tons annually. The Mozambican Civil War, which began in 1977, disrupted this streak of prosperity; by 1988, the Port of Maputo barely handled a million tons per year. The war ended in 1992, but it was not until 2003, when the MPDC was formed as a public-private partnership, that the Port of Maputo began to see an increase in business. The port went from handling 4.5 million tons per year in 2003 to handling 14 million tons—the expected throughput of 2012.

== Port ==
The deepwater port of Maputo consists of two principal areas of usage:

- Maputo Cargo Terminals
- Matola Bulk Terminals

The 2022 World Bank Container Port Performance Index ranked Maputo 248th out of the 348 ports surveyed. In the 2023 report, the port slipped to 317th out of the 405 ports surveyed.

The port attracted record volumes in 2023, much of it from South African mines due to the logistics crisis in South Africa affecting the Port of Richards Bay and Port of Durban.

== Customs and transit regime ==
The Port of Maputo is important to the transit of cargo beyond Mozambique. The World Trade Organization’s Trade Policy Report by the Secretariat reported that in 2022, 51.7% of all cargo through Mozambique’s eight seaports was goods in transit, and that Maputo served as the country’s largest port. To cross its territory, however, Mozambique requires payment of a refundable transit bond determined by the tariff the cargo would owe under Mozambique’s tariff code to cover the risk of cargo being diverted to the domestic market. Horne-Ferreira found that there was no uniform application of bond policy across Mozambique and that the bond system was “the single biggest inhibitor to bidirectional flow of transit cargo”. Ministerial Diploma 10/2002 approved the Customs Transit Regulations including the bond formula that relied on the valuation of goods by a customs official. Sequeira and Djankov identified that goods were not valued prior to cargo arrival at the port or border post where customs officials threatened reclassification under higher tariff categories, risking inflated bonds, to extract bribes from firms. The study found that of 1,300 shipments tracked from 2007-2008, 53% of observed shipments at Maputo involved bribes compared to the 36% of shipments at the competing South African port in Durban. 80% of those bribes went to customs officials. Firms transporting cargo classified under higher tariffs in Mozambique would avoid Maputo, and firms could travel 319 km further costing three to four times the amount of the bribe avoided.

Mozambique made the use of an Electronic Single Window (JUE) in import and export operations mandatory in 2011, an effort judged by the Centro de Integridade Públic to have reduced clearance times and decreased petty corruption following its first five years of effect. Ministerial Diploma 314/2012 was passed waiving the guarantee for certain goods, or for an Authorised Economic Operator (AEO) with a mutual recognition agreement for AEOs between the destination country and Mozambique. The reform incorporated recommendations from the Maputo Corridor Logistics Initiative to modify the Mozambican customs regime. Electronic sealing and cargo tracking for transit goods began being used in 2023 under Ministerial Diploma 19/2023. In 2023, there were 7,666 complaints recorded by the Revenue Authority, including 3,331 concerning customs valuation, and 2,424 concerning tariff classification. 2023 reports showed that 70.62% of declarations in Mozambique went through documentary and physical inspection. In the same year, Decree 90/2023 abolished the compulsory use of customs brokers allowing traders to file declarations themselves. As of 2023, Mozambique had not signed any AEO mutual recognition agreements, though talks with South Africa were ongoing, and had approved 30 Authorized Economic Operators. As of 2024, the Revenue Authority does not provide any advance rulings, determinations issued before goods arrive, on classification and valuation.

== LNG development ==
In November 2019, international oil major Total S.A. and a gas developer, Gigajoule, signed a joint development agreement for the importation of Liquefied natural gas at the Matola harbour, Maputo. The project is expected to commence from 2022 and will see a floating storage and regasification unit moored at the harbour.

== See also ==
- Government of Mozambique
- Maputo River
- Transport in Mozambique
- Liquefied natural gas
- List of ports in Mozambique
