= Manjacaze =

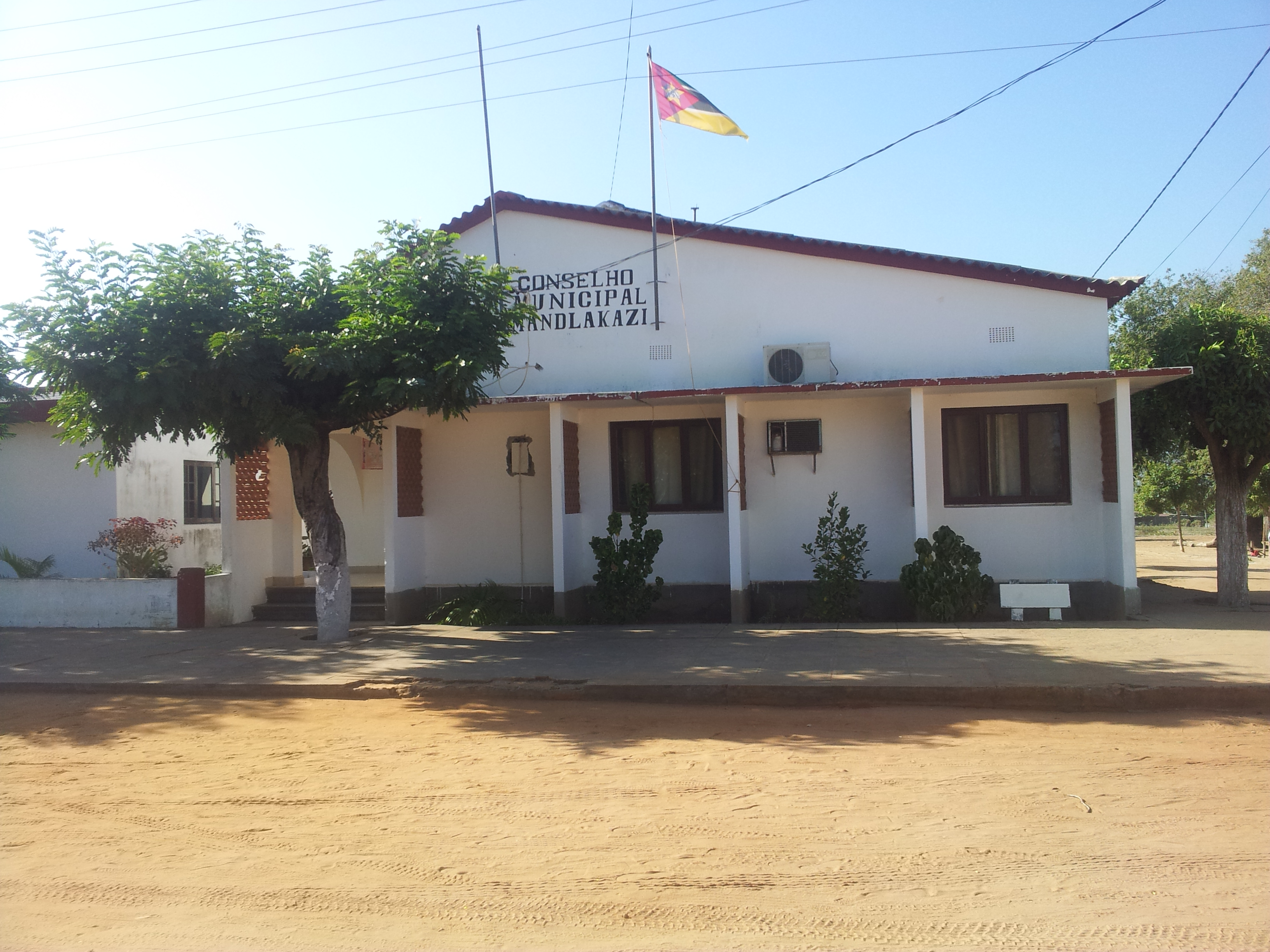
- Manjacaze Municipal Council Building

- Location within Mozambique
- Coordinates: 24°43′S 33°53′E
- Country: Mozambique
- Provinces: Gaza Province

Population (2008)
  - Total: 26,641

Manjacaze (Mandlakazi) is a town in the province of Gaza, located in southern Mozambique. It serves as the administrative center of Manjacaze District.

== Demographics ==
Year	Population
2008	26 641

== Economy ==
The town formerly had a cashew processing plant, which was shut down in the early 21st century, but reopened in 2026.

== Transport ==
Manjacaze was connected to the port city of Xai-Xai by the 762mm gauge Gaza Railway. It is a railway junction.

== See also ==
- Transport in Mozambique
- Railway stations in Mozambique

== Notable inhabitants ==
- Paulina Chiziane, author
- Eduardo Mondlane, President of FRELIMO, 1962-1969
- Gabriel Estavao Monjane, tallest African - see List of tallest people
