= Praia do Xai-Xai =

Beach in Mozambique

Coordinates: 25.124°S 33.733°E

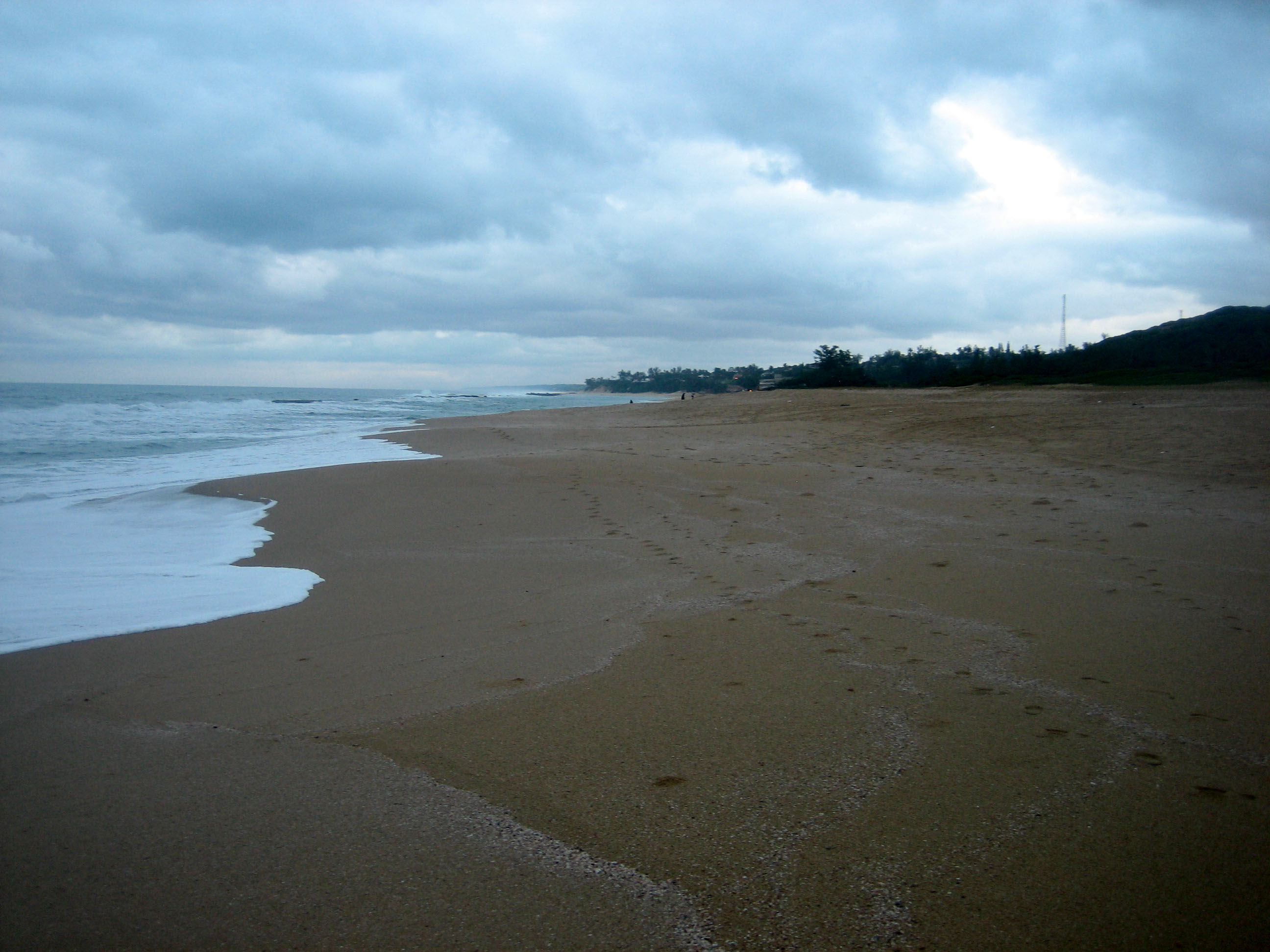
Praia do Xai-Xai

Praia do Xai-Xai is a beach which is a tourist destination in Mozambique. Located approximately 10 kilometers from Xai-Xai, the seat of Mozambique's Gaza Province, the beach attracts visitors who are interested in exploring the massive coral reef that runs parallel to the shoreline.
