= List of ports in Mozambique =

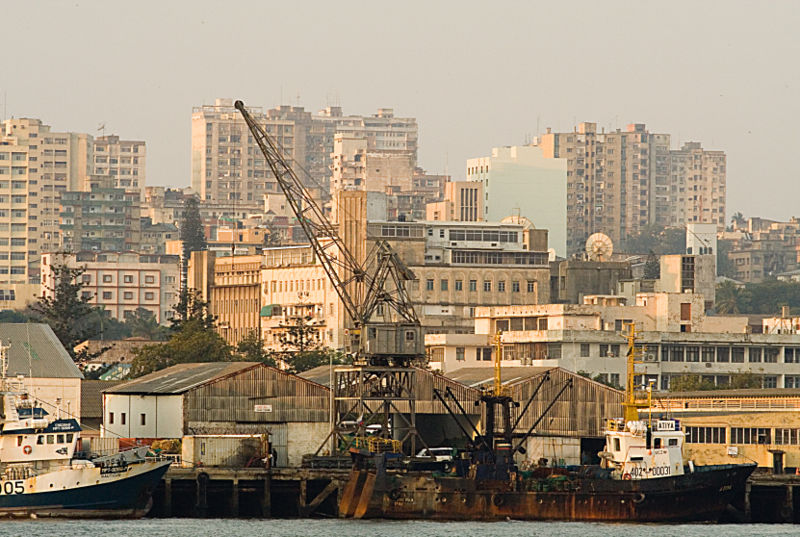
Maputo Harbour in 2006

This list of Ports and harbours in Mozambique details the ports, harbours around the coast of Mozambique.

== List of ports and harbours in Mozambique ==
Port/Harbour name	Province	Town name	Coordinates	UN/Locode	Remarks
Port of Maputo	Maputo City	Maputo City	25°58′S 32°33′E	MZMPM	Large-sized port on the shores of Maputo Bay.
Port of Matola	Maputo Province	Matola	25°57′S 32°29′E	MZMAT	Medium-sized port. The maximum draught is 12.3 meters.
Port of Inhambane	Inhambane Province	Inhambane	23°52′S 35°22′E	MZINH	Small-sized port on the shores of Inhambane Bay.
Port of Maxixe	Inhambane Province	Maxixe	23°51′S 35°21′E	MZMAX	Small-sized port on the shores of Inhambane Bay.
Port of Beira	Sofala Province	Beira	19°48′S 34°49′E	MZBEW	Medium-sized port located on the shores of Sofala Bay
Port of Nacala	Nampula Province	Nacala	14°32′S 40°40′E	MZMNC	Also known as Nacala Porto The deepest port in Southern Africa.
Port of Pebane	Zambezia Province	Pebane	17°15′S 38°07′E	MZPEB	Medium-sized port. The maximum draught is 5.7 meters.
Port of Mocambique	Nampula Province	Island of Mozambique	15°02′S 40°43′E	MZMZQ	It is also known as Ilha de Mocambique.
Port of Moma	Nampula Province	Moma District	16°37′S 39°43′E	MZMMW	Medium-sized port.
Port of Quelimane	Zambezia Province	Quelimane	17°53′S 36°53′E	MZUEL	Medium-sized port. The maximum draught is 2.9 meters.
