= Xai-Xai =

Capital city of Gaza, Mozambique

Xai-Xai João Belo
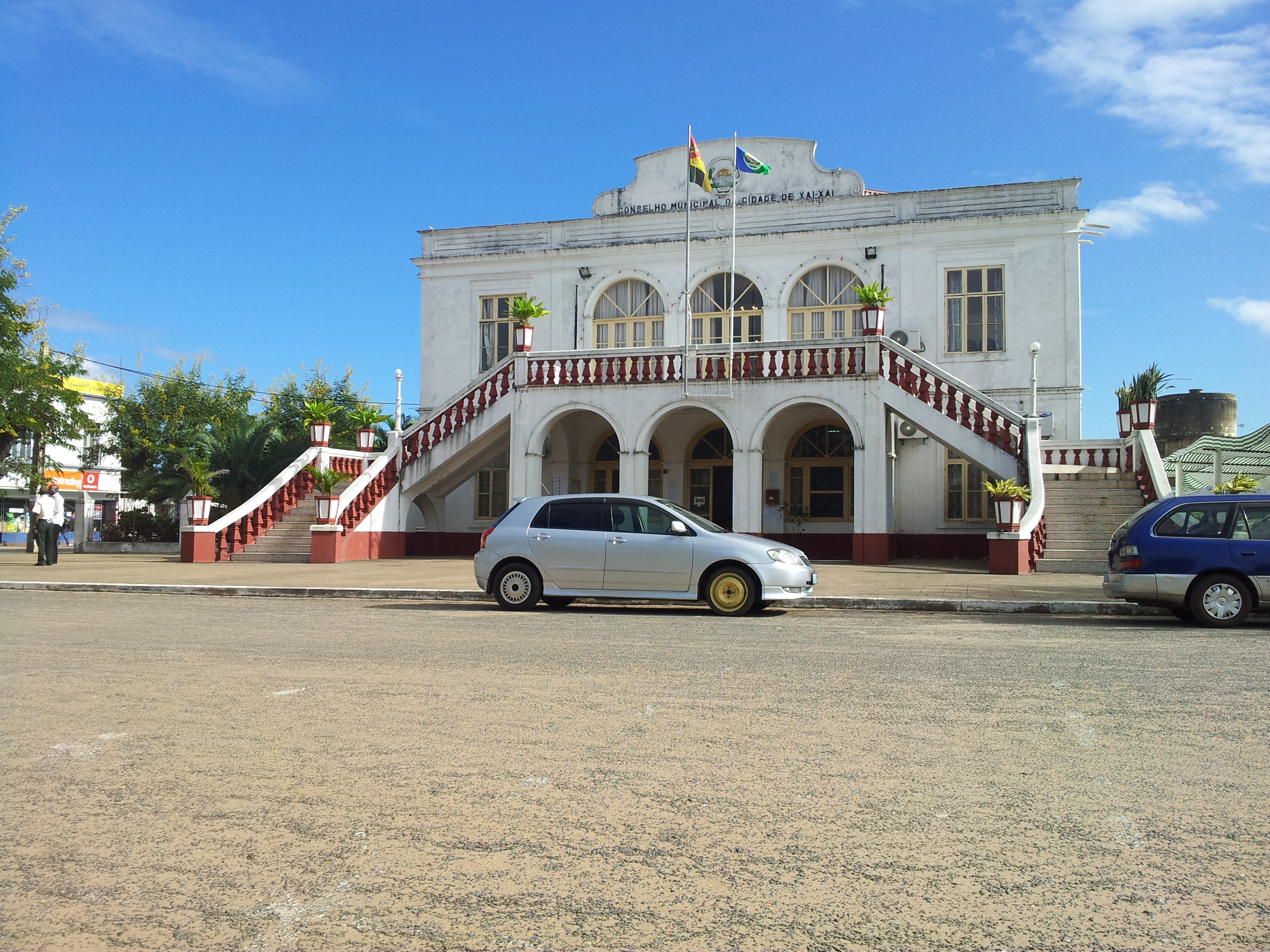
- Municipal Council of Xai-Xai

- Location within Mozambique
- Coordinates: 25°03′00″S 33°39′00″E
- Country: Mozambique
- Provinces: Gaza Province
- District: Xai-Xai District
- Elevation: 9 m (30 ft)

Population (2007)
  - Total: 116,343
  - Languages: Portuguese Tsonga
- Time zone: +2
- Climate: Aw

Xai-Xai (Portuguese pronunciation: [ˈʃaj ˈʃaj]) is a city in the south of Mozambique. Until 1975, the city was named João Belo. It is the capital of Gaza Province. As of 2007 it has a population of 116,343.

== History ==
=== Portuguese rule ===
Xai-Xai, formerly João Belo, developed in the early 1900s, under Portuguese rule, as a companion port to Lourenço Marques (now Maputo), though its economic significance was never on par with Mozambique's largest city. Before independence from Portugal in 1975, Xai-Xai was known as João Belo, in the Overseas Province of Mozambique. João Belo grew and developed under Portuguese rule as a port, agricultural and industrial centre (rice and cashew were harvested and processed), a provider of services, including a district hospital and banking, and an administrative centre. Tourism was also important with beaches and hotels. In 1970, the city had 63,949 inhabitants.

=== Post-independence from Portugal ===
It was hit hard by the 2000 Limpopo floods, caused by four weeks of heavy rainfall accompanying Cyclone Leon-Eline, leaving some buildings 3 metres (10 ft) under water. However, shortly after the waters receded the town was opened for business again.

== Geography ==
At an elevation of 9.8 m (32 ft), Xai-Xai is located on the Limpopo River, close to the Indian Ocean, and in a wide, fertile plain where rice is grown. It is 200 kilometres (120 mi) from the capital, Maputo, and is 5.2 km (3 1/4 mi) from Donguene, 4.0 km (2 1/2 mi) from Macandene, 2.8 km (1 3/4 mi) from Chiluane and 800 m (1/2 mi) from Tavene.

=== Climate ===
Xai-Xai has a tropical savanna climate (Köppen climate classification Aw).

Climate data for Xai-Xai (1961–1990)
Month	Jan	Feb	Mar	Apr	May	Jun	Jul	Aug	Sep	Oct	Nov	Dec	Year
Mean daily maximum °C (°F)	31.2 (88.2)	30.9 (87.6)	30.2 (86.4)	28.9 (84.0)	27.0 (80.6)	25.0 (77.0)	24.9 (76.8)	26.3 (79.3)	27.7 (81.9)	29.1 (84.4)	30.0 (86.0)	30.9 (87.6)	28.5 (83.3)
Mean daily minimum °C (°F)	21.7 (71.1)	21.9 (71.4)	20.9 (69.6)	18.4 (65.1)	15.3 (59.5)	12.6 (54.7)	12.1 (53.8)	13.6 (56.5)	15.7 (60.3)	17.6 (63.7)	19.4 (66.9)	20.8 (69.4)	17.5 (63.5)
Average rainfall mm (inches)	134.7 (5.30)	131.9 (5.19)	104.5 (4.11)	99.0 (3.90)	89.0 (3.50)	63.9 (2.52)	49.6 (1.95)	32.8 (1.29)	33.6 (1.32)	66.3 (2.61)	71.6 (2.82)	123.2 (4.85)	1,000.1 (39.36)
Average rainy days	9.1	8.8	7.5	6.9	6.6	5.6	4.0	3.3	5.5	6.0	6.8	8.9	79
Source: World Meteorological Organization

== Attractions ==
Xai-Xai is a bustling town with markets, shops, restaurants, bars, petrol stations, banks, and a post office. A few blocks from the central market, there is an open-air furniture factory, located underneath several cashew trees. Xai-Xai Beach, approximately 12 km from Xai-Xai, has been a popular tourist attraction since Mozambican tourism, originally under Portuguese administration, was first developed before 1975. A coral reef running parallel to the shore offers good snorkeling and protects the beach from strong waves. In addition, the Wenela Tidal Pool, two kilometres (1 1/4 mi) south of the town, includes a natural tunnel and blow hole that links the pool to the Indian Ocean. Right on Xai-Xai Beach there is a giant rock pool that forms at medium and low tides that is up to 200 metres long, forming a giant safe pool for families and swimmers.

== Demographics ==
Year	Population
1970	63,949
1997	103,251
2007	116,343

== Transport ==
Xai-Xai was served by the 762 mm (2 ft 6 in) gauge Gaza Railway, which went to the city of Manjacaze and beyond. It lies on the EN1 road which connects with the roads from the Namaacha and Ressano Garcia borders. It is possible to travel to Xai-Xai by charter flight from Maputo.

In 2017, the People's Republic of China pledged $60 million to build an airport in Xai-Xai.

Xai-Xai Chongoene Airport was inaugurated in 2021 and is served by one airline, LAM Mozambique.

== Gallery ==
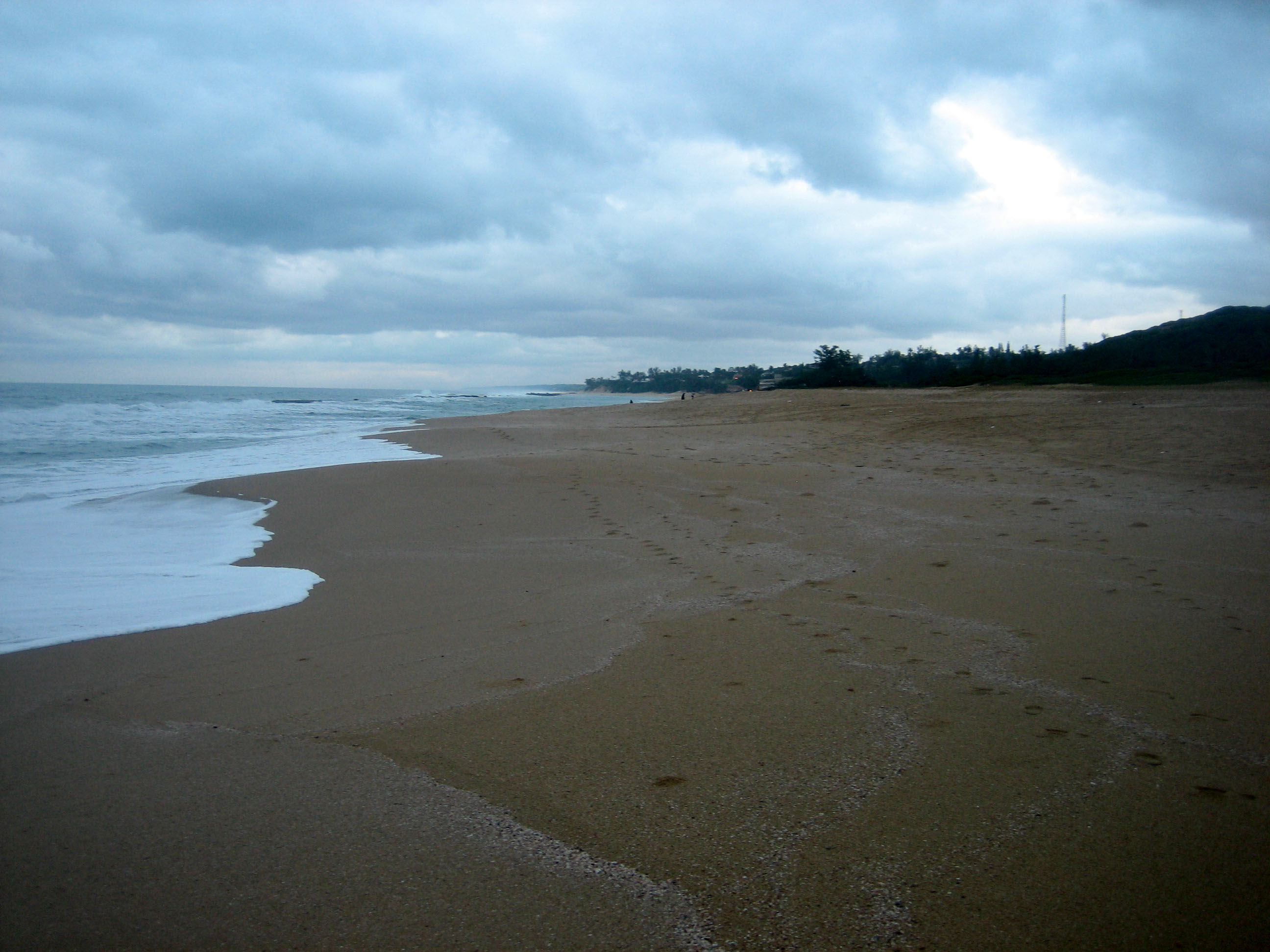
Praia do Xai-Xai

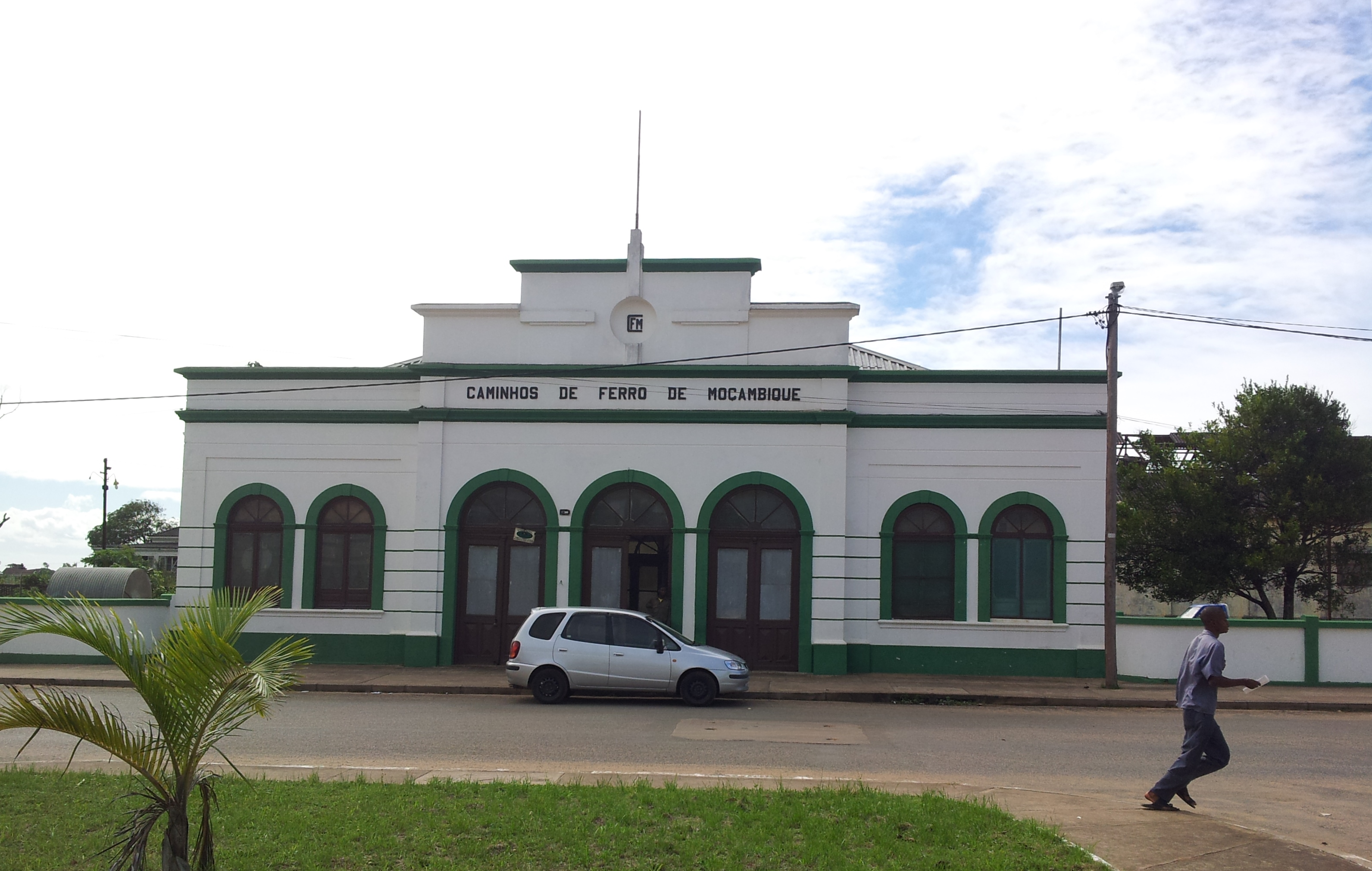
Xai-Xai train station

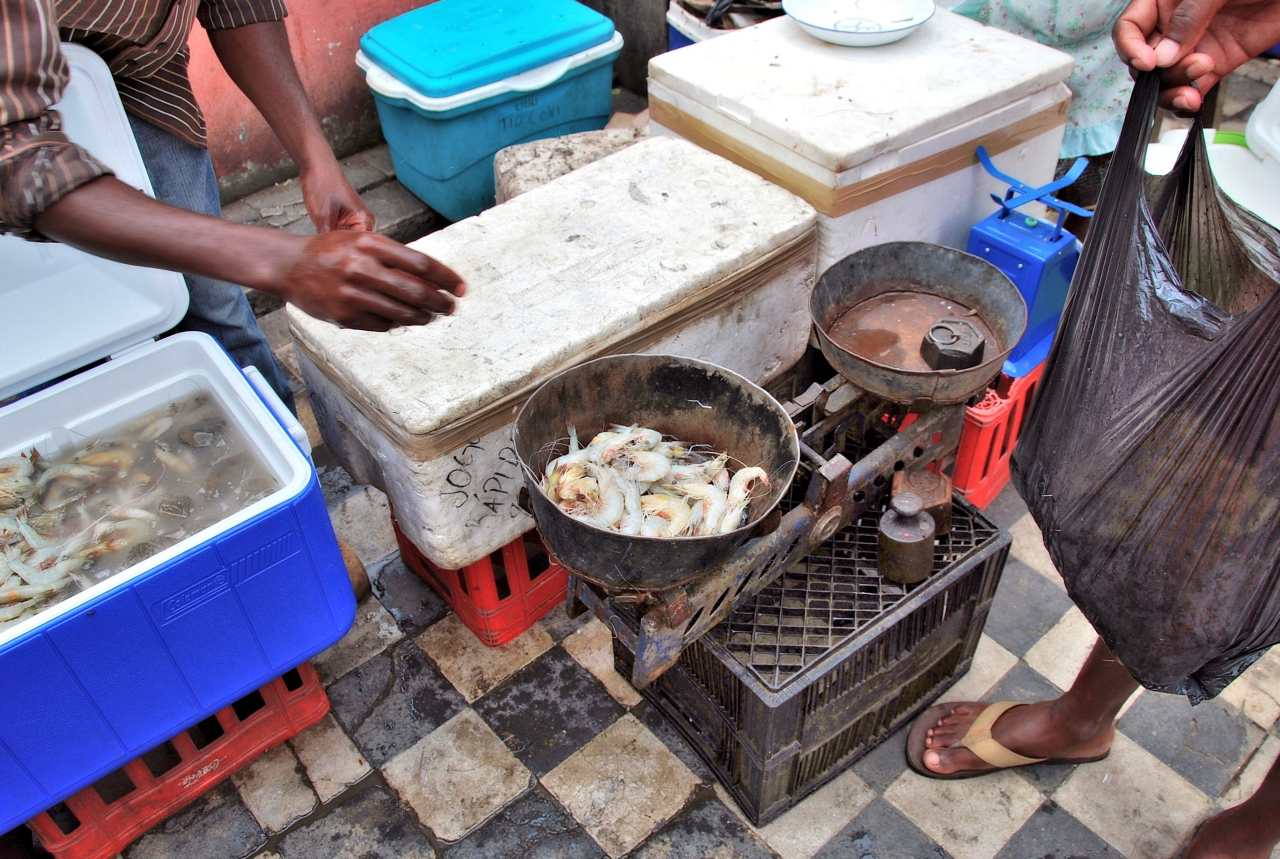
Prawns at Xai-Xai market

== Sister city ==
- Cascais, Portugal

== See also ==
- List of reduplicated place names
