= Memba (disambiguation) =

The Memba are a tribal group of Arunachal Pradesh, India.

Memba may also refer to:

- Memba District in Mozambique
- Memba Bay in Mozambique
- Tshangla language
