= Paulina Chiziane =

Mozambican author (born 1955)

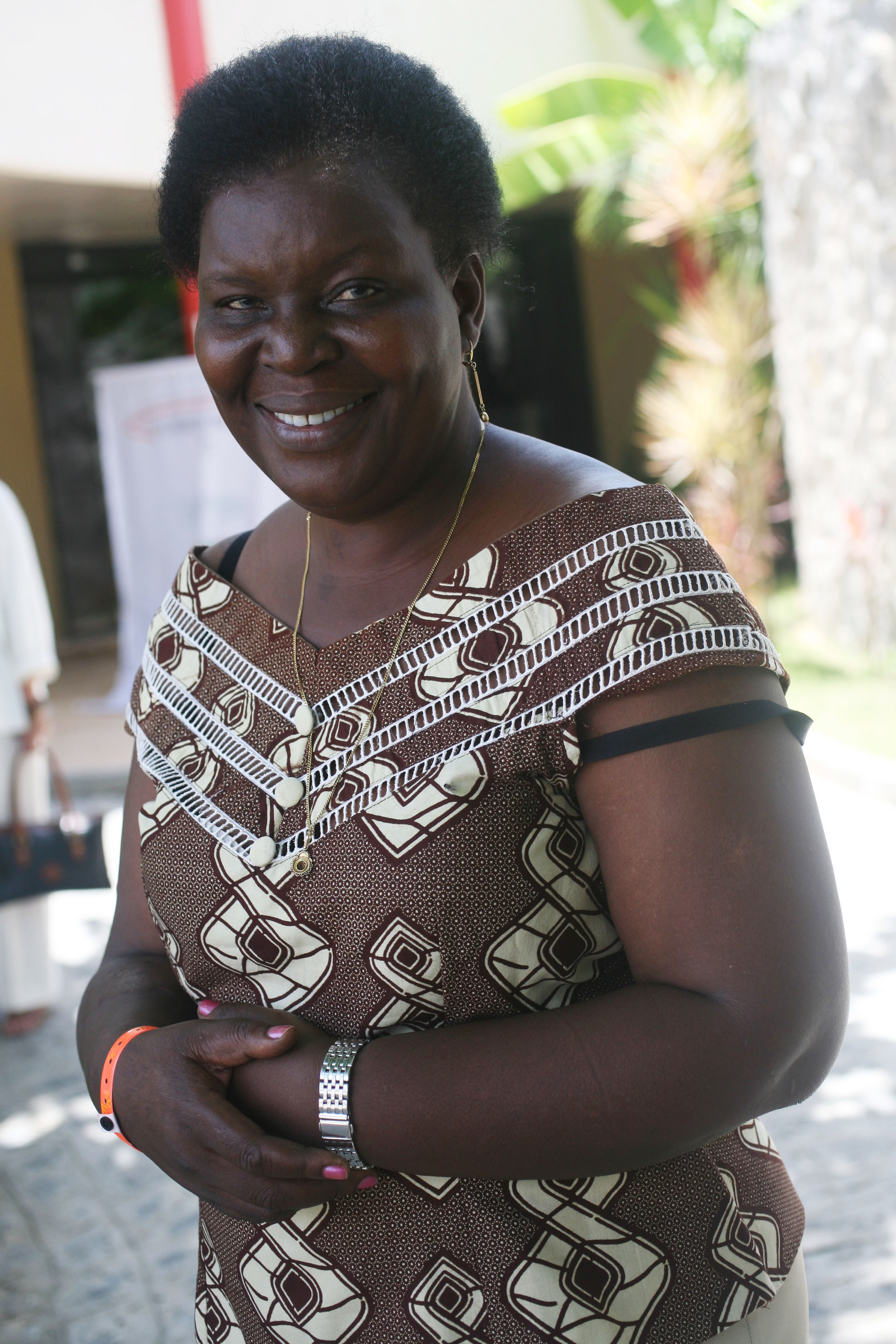
- Born: 4 June 1955 (age 71); Manjacaze, Gaza, Portuguese Mozambique
- Writing career
- Period: Post-modernism
- Genres: Novel, Short stories
- Notable works: Sétimo juramento, Niketche
- Notable awards: Prémio José Craveirinha de Literatura 2003; Prémio Camões 2021

Paulina "Poulli" Chiziane (born 4 June 1955, Manjacaze, southern province of Gaza, Mozambique) is an author of novels and short stories in the Portuguese language. She was awarded the 2021 Camões Prize for literature, awarded to writers from Portuguese-speaking countries.

== Early life ==
She studied at Eduardo Mondlane University, Maputo. She was born to a Protestant family that moved from Gaza to the capital Maputo (then Lourenço Marques) during the writer's early childhood. At home she spoke Chopi and Ronga.

== Writing ==
Chiziane was the first woman in Mozambique to publish a novel. Her writing has generated some polemical discussions about social issues, such as the practice of polygamy in the country. For example, her first novel, Balada do Amor ao Vento (1990), discusses polygamy in southern Mozambique during the colonial period. Related to her active involvement in the politics of Frelimo (Liberation Front of Mozambique), her narrative often reflects the social uneasiness of a country ravaged and divided by the war of liberation and the civil conflicts that followed independence. Her novel Niketche: Uma História de Poligamia (translated into English as The First Wife: A Tale of Polygamy) won the José Craveirinha Prize in 2003.

== Interpretation ==
Chiziane's writing has often been defined as political and feminist. Writing for this author is a mission. It is a way to express the difficulties that women encounter when faced with the heterogeneity of Mozambican cultural traditions and the newly developed legal and administrative systems. Chiziane's writing addresses regional differences in cultural and political aspects of gender relations. In her novel Niketche, for instance, she depicts the Mozambican South as dominated by a patriarchal culture, whereas the North is shaped by traditions of matriarchal rule. She also alludes to the fact that Frelimo itself assumed an ambiguous attitude with regard to polygamy, making it illegal at first, but then tolerating its continuing practice. Throughout her work, Chiziane's attention has focused on broad social issues related to women's rights and concerns, such as monogamy and polygamy, but also on subjective and intimate relationships between individual men and women. Chiziane has stated that, in accordance with the tradition of her land, she considers herself a storyteller rather than a novelist.

In 2016, she announced that she was retiring from writing.

== Novels ==
- Balada de Amor ao Vento (1990), ISBN 978-972-21-1557-5
- Ventos do Apocalipse (1996), ISBN 972-21-1262-7
- O Setimo Juramento (2000), ISBN 972-21-1329-1
- Niketche: Uma História de Poligamia (2002) - Companhia das Letras, ISBN 85-359-0471-9
- O Alegre Canto da Perdiz (2008) - Caminho, ISBN 978-972-21-1976-4.
- As andorinhas (2009) ISBN 978-856-11-9197-9
- Eu, mulher: por uma nova visão do mundo (2013), ISBN 8561191902
- Por quem vibram os tambores do além? (2013), ISBN 9899817813
- Ngoma Yethu: o curandeiro e o Novo Testamento (2015), ISBN 858358043X
- O canto dos escravizados (2017), ISBN 8583580367
- A voz do cárcere (2021), ISBN 978-989-53-0553-7

== Awards and honours ==
- On 20 October 2021, it was announced that Chiziane had been awarded the 2021 Prémio Camões (Camões Prize). This is given to writers from Lusophone countries for the entire body of their work. She was the first black author to receive this award.
- On 28 November 2022, Paulina was awarded the academic degree of Doctor Honoris Causa by Universidade Pedagógica
- In November 2023, Chiziane was named to the BBC's 100 Women list.
