= Ressano Garcia =

Town in Maputo, Mozambique

Coordinates: 25°26′34″S 31°59′43″E

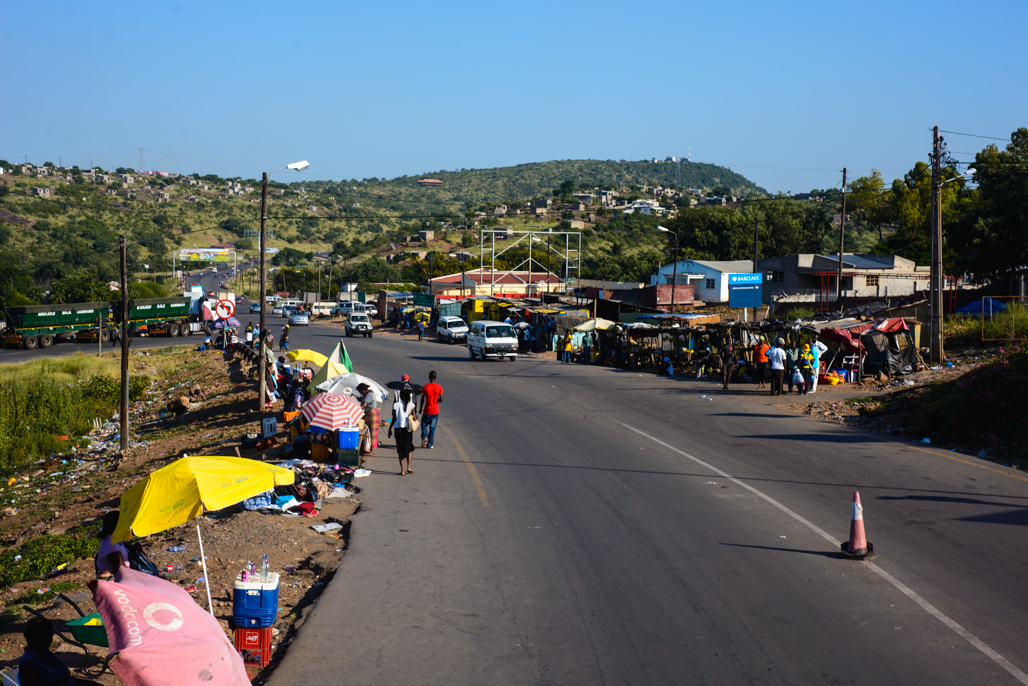
View to Ressano Garcia, right behind the border post.

Ressano Garcia is a small town in the Maputo Province, Mozambique,. The town is adjacent to Komatipoort in South Africa. The town has around 11,200 people living in it.

== Transport ==
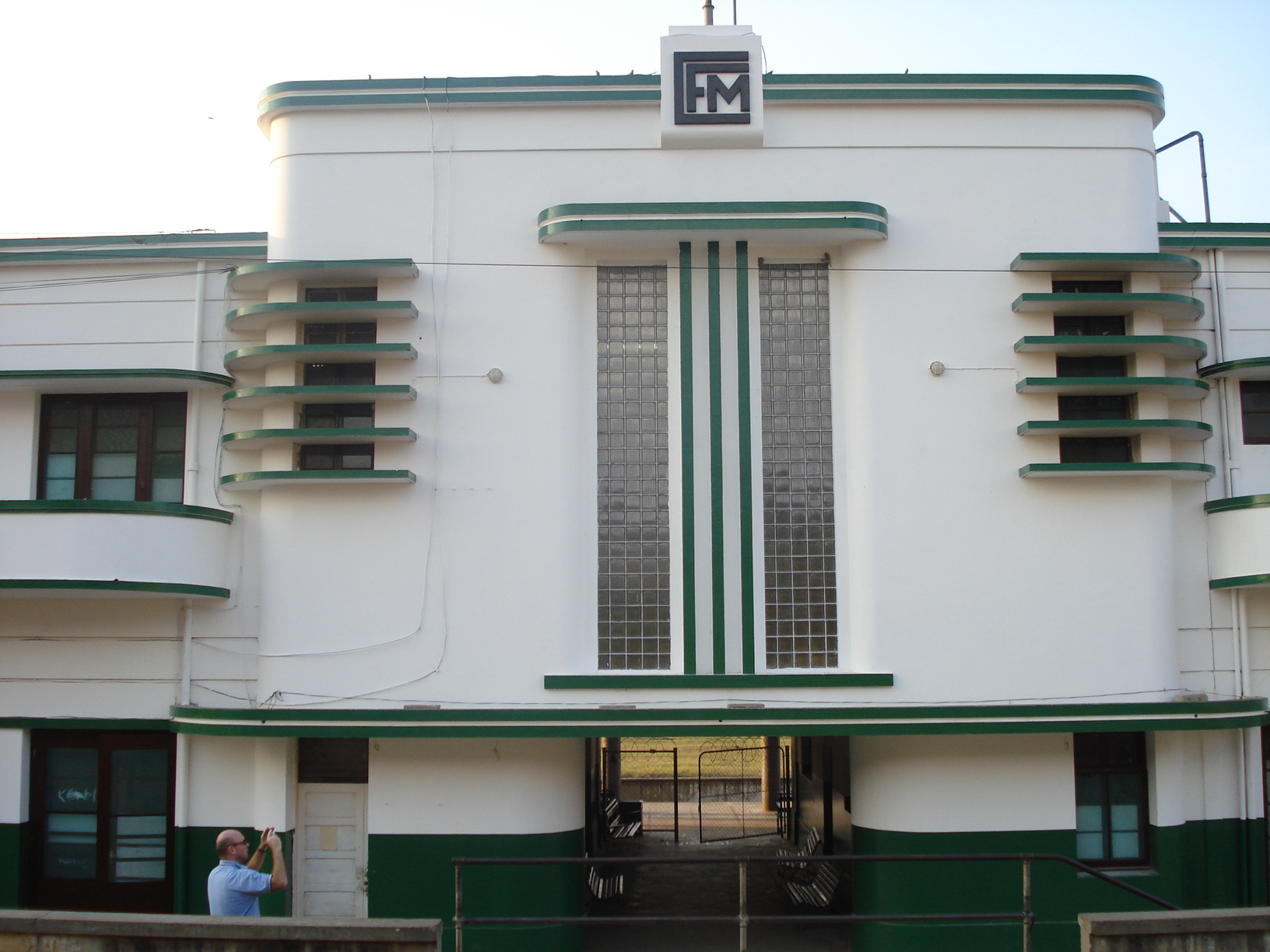
Ressano Garcia Railway Station

Both road and rail cross the border here from Mozambique into South Africa, and visa-versa.

This town has a railway station for the loading and offloading of passengers and cargo on the Pretoria–Maputo railway.

== Industry ==
A gas-fired power station has begun operating in 2014. The power plant is co-owned by EDM and Sasol. It receives gas by pipeline from the Pana gas fields in Eastern Mozambique. The first plant has a generating capacity of 175 MW.

== See also ==
- Transport in Mozambique
