= Advance ruling =

Advance ruling, also known as a pre-ruling, or binding ruling, is a formal written decision issued by an administrative authority, such as a customs or tax agency, in response to a request from a legal person, such as an individual or a business entity. It provides binding guidance on how specific laws, regulations, or tariffs will apply to a proposed transaction, import, or action before it occurs. This mechanism is used across various fields of administrative law to promote certainty, compliance, and efficient decision-making.

Advance rulings are recognized in international agreements, such as the World Trade Organization's Trade Facilitation Agreement, and are implemented in many jurisdictions to facilitate trade and regulatory processes.

== Purpose and benefits ==
The main objective of an advance ruling is to offer legal certainty by clarifying the interpretation and application of rules to planned activities, thereby reducing the risk of future disputes, penalties, or unexpected liabilities. They are particularly valuable in complex scenarios involving international trade, regulatory compliance, or significant financial implications.

Benefits include

- Enhanced predictability for businesses and individuals in planning transactions.
- Promotion of voluntary compliance with laws and regulations.
- Reduction in administrative burdens and potential litigation for both requesters and authorities.

== Legal effect ==
An advance ruling is typically binding on the issuing authority for the specific requester and the described facts, as long as the transaction proceeds as outlined and no material changes occur or misrepresentations are discovered. It does not bind courts or third parties and may be subject to administrative or judicial review if challenged.

In some systems, rulings can be modified or revoked due to changes in law, new facts, or policy shifts, but they generally provide a safe harbor for the requester.

=== In customs law ===
Advance rulings are commonly issued by customs authorities on matters such as tariff classification, origin of goods, valuation, and duty rates for prospective imports. For example, an importer might request a ruling to confirm the customs treatment of goods before shipment, ensuring compliance and avoiding delays at borders.

In the United States, U.S. Customs and Border Protection provides binding rulings that apply to future identical transactions.

=== In tax law ===
Advance rulings in taxation clarify the tax implications of proposed arrangements, such as mergers or international transfers. They are available in many jurisdictions to support business planning.

=== In other areas of administrative law ===
Beyond customs and tax, advance rulings appear in broader administrative contexts, such as regulatory approvals, licensing, or interpretations of statutes. For instance, agencies may issue declaratory rulings to confirm compliance with environmental, antitrust, or labeling requirements without formal enforcement.

Examples include advance decisions on product labeling under consumer protection laws or eligibility for government programs.

=== Related judiciary concept ===
Similar tools include declaratory judgments in judicial systems, where courts provide binding opinions on legal rights without actual controversy, and informal advisory opinions that lack binding force.

== Criticism and international transparency ==
Despite their benefits for legal certainty, advance tax rulings have faced scrutiny for their potential misuse in aggressive tax planning. In some instances, private rulings granted to multinational corporations have been criticized for functioning as "sweetheart deals" that facilitate base erosion and profit shifting (BEPS). Following high-profile leaks, such as the Luxembourg Leaks, international bodies like the European Union and the OECD introduced frameworks requiring the automatic exchange of information on advance rulings between jurisdictions to ensure greater transparency and prevent unfair tax competition.

== See also ==
- Private letter ruling
