= Gaza Railway =

Narrow-gauge railway in Mozambique

Overview
- Termini: Xai-Xai; Chicomo and Mauela

History
- Commenced: Early 1990s

Technical
- Line length: 140 km (87 mi)
- Track gauge: 2 ft 6 in (762 mm)

The Gaza Railway is a 2 ft 6 in (762 mm) narrow gauge railway that operated in southern Mozambique from Xai-Xai (former Villa de João Belo) via Manjacaze junction (53 km) with branches to Chicomo (37 km) and Mauela (50 km). It was constructed in the early 1900s for the transportation of passengers and cashew nuts. With branches, its total length was 140 km (87 mi). The railway operated several small American steam locomotives, including a Baldwin 2-8-0, built in 1925, a Baldwin 0-6-2 and an Alco 2-6-0. In 2000, parts of the railway line were washed away by floods and the railway has not been used since then. As of 2026 the website of CFM, the national railway company of Mozambique, does not list it.

The Xai-Xai Railway Station, main terminus of the line, is at the intersection of Rua Milagre Mabote with Rua Martines Revolucao, at 25.043031°S 33.643360°E where it can be seen on Google Maps.
