= Port of Beira =

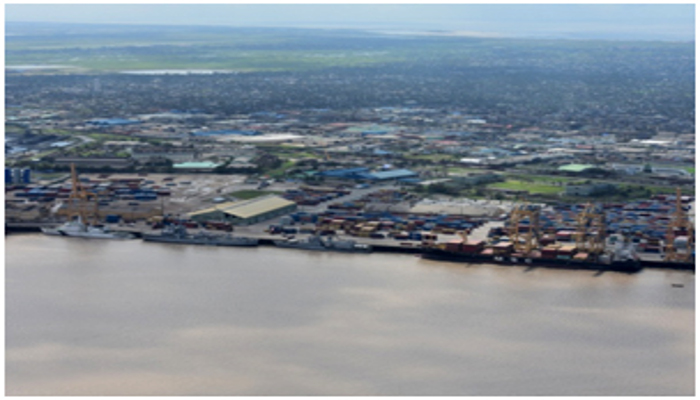
- Click on the map for a fullscreen view

Location
- Country: Mozambique
- Location: Beira
- Coordinates: 19°49′S 34°50′E
- UN/LOCODE: MZBEW

Details
- Opened: 1890; 135 years ago
- Operated by: CFM
- Type of harbour: Artificial

Statistics
- Website

The Port of Beira is a Mozambican port located in the city of Beira, capital of the Sofala Province. It is located in Sofala Bay, which forms a huge complex with the mouth of the Pungoe River, known as the Beira estuary, facing the Mozambique Channel. It is the second largest port in Mozambique, built to replace the port of Old Sofala in the 1890s.

The port belongs to the Mozambican government, and the public company Mozambique Ports and Railways (CFM) is responsible for its administration. CFM holds the operating license for the cargo terminals, in addition to the passenger terminal.

The Port of Beira comprises two piers, with a depth between 8 and 12 meters. Access to the port is via the "Macuti channel" which, under normal conditions, is duly dredged and conveniently buoyed, allowing navigability 24 hours a day. Night navigation is allowed for ships with a maximum draft of 7 meters and no more than 140 meters in length due to restrictions on the Macuti channel curve. The Mucuti shipping channel, the port's access route, has a minimum width of 60 meters and a maximum of 200 meters, a length of 31 km and a depth of about 11 meters.

The port is the terminus for two railway lines — Beira-Bulawayo (or Machipanda) and Sena — transporting products from Malawi and Zimbabwe. Another important flow connection is made by the Trans-African Highway 9. It is a fundamental part of the logistics complex of the "Beira Corridor".

== See also ==
- List of ports in Mozambique
