= Namialo =

Coordinates: 14°55′41″S 39°59′32″E

Namialo is a small town in northeastern Mozambique.

== Transport ==
It lies on the northernmost railway system in Mozambique, leading to the port of Nacala. That railway line has a triangle and other sidings. It is the site of a concrete sleeper plant built in 2013 by WEGH. The cement comes from Nacala.

== See also ==
- Railway stations in Mozambique
