= Pretoria–Maputo railway =

Railway line in southern Africa

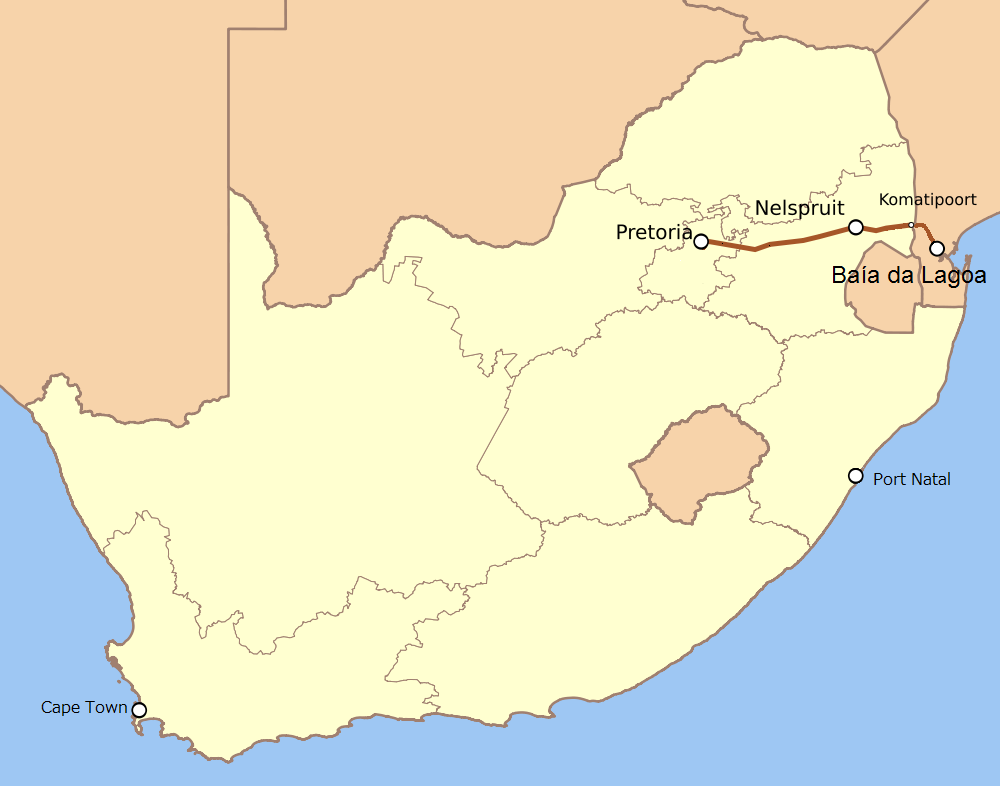

Overview
- Status: Operational
- Termini: Port of Maputo, Maputo, Mozambique; Pretoria, South Africa

Service
- Type: Cape gauge
- Operator(s): CFM and TFR

History
- Opened: 1890

Technical
- Line length: 567 km (352 mi)
- Track gauge: 1,067 mm (3 ft 6 in)

Pretoria–Maputo railway, also called Delagoa Bay railway, Iron railway and Eastern railway, is a railway that connects the city of Maputo, Mozambique, to the city of Pretoria, in South Africa. It is 567 km long, in 1067 mm gauge. The Mozambican section, between Maputo and Ressano Garcia, is managed by the state-owned Mozambique Ports and Railways (CFM) company, and it is officially known in Mozambique as the Ressano Garcia Line; in turn, on the South African stretch, between the town of Komatipoort and city of Pretoria, the administration is done by the company Transnet Freight Rail.

Its main maritime logistics facilities is the Port of Maputo.

== History ==
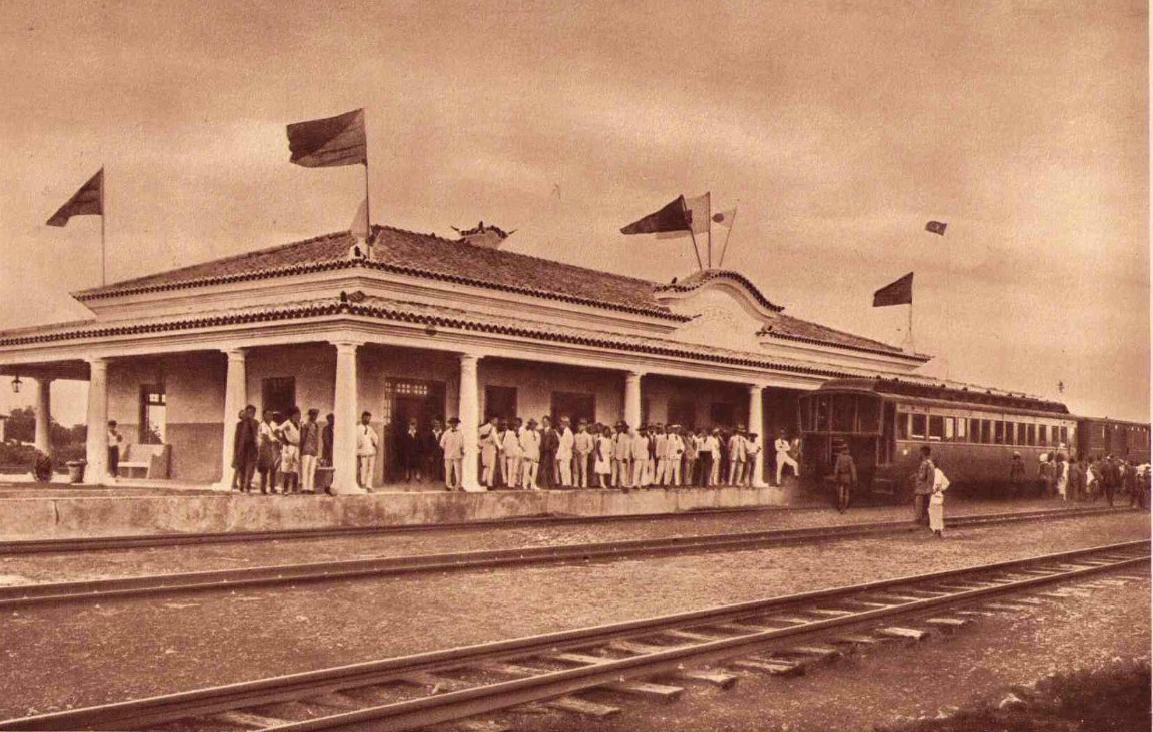
Moamba Railway Station, c. 1920.

The construction of a railway line to connect the Republic of Transvaal to the port of Lourenço Marques, in Portuguese East Africa, was preceded by a long planning phase. The Pretoria government tendered the project, winning the concession for a private railway company in 1870, promising areas of 850 farms as payment guarantee. The construction project had to be postponed because the licensed company was unable to obtain the capital initially required. After several years of preparation, the government decided to take control of the construction in 1876. The Portuguese engineer and officer Joaquim José Machado carried out a new survey of land in 1881 and 1882 to find an ideal route, as some gold fields on both sides of the Crocodile River should have easy access to a rail connection.

In 1872, the colonial administration of Mozambique granted, for the first time, a concession to build a railway line from Maputo to Pretoria. A corresponding agreement was concluded in 1875 between the government of the Republic of Transvaal and that of Portuguese East Africa. However, it was only on 1 March 1890 that the route from Maputo to the Mozambican border station Ressano Garcia was opened.

An obstacle to route planning on the South African side was the steep mountain positions and the deep valleys near Komatipoort, in the area of the Crocodile River. These terrain characteristics also delayed the construction of an efficient road. In addition, in the 1880s, a financing contract worth half a million pounds on the Amsterdam capital market was eventually lost. Construction began on 2 June 1887, and was completed after seven years on 20 October 1894, so that the entire route was opened to traffic on 2 November 1894. The official opening took place on 8 July 1895 in a ceremony chaired by the president of Transvaal Paul Kruger, attended by the Mozambican colonial administrator António Enes.

On the South African side the line was operated by the Netherlands–South African Railway Company - NZASM (Nederlandsch-Zuid-Afrikaansche Spoorweg Maatschappij). After the end of the Second Boer War, the railroad was transferred to the private company Central South African Railways and from 1910 to the state-owned company Railways of South Africa.

In the course of a government policy aimed at economic self-sufficiency under P. W. Botha, coupled with the changing political situation in South Africa (increasingly isolated due to apartheid), the construction of the Komatipoort railway began in 1983, passing through Eswatini; connecting with the Goba railway, another extension was made, giving rise to the Richards Bay railway, which connects to the Port of Richards Bay (then Natal Province). Products from Eastern South Africa could thus be disposed of in politically safe territory, in a specific sea port.

== Railway branches ==
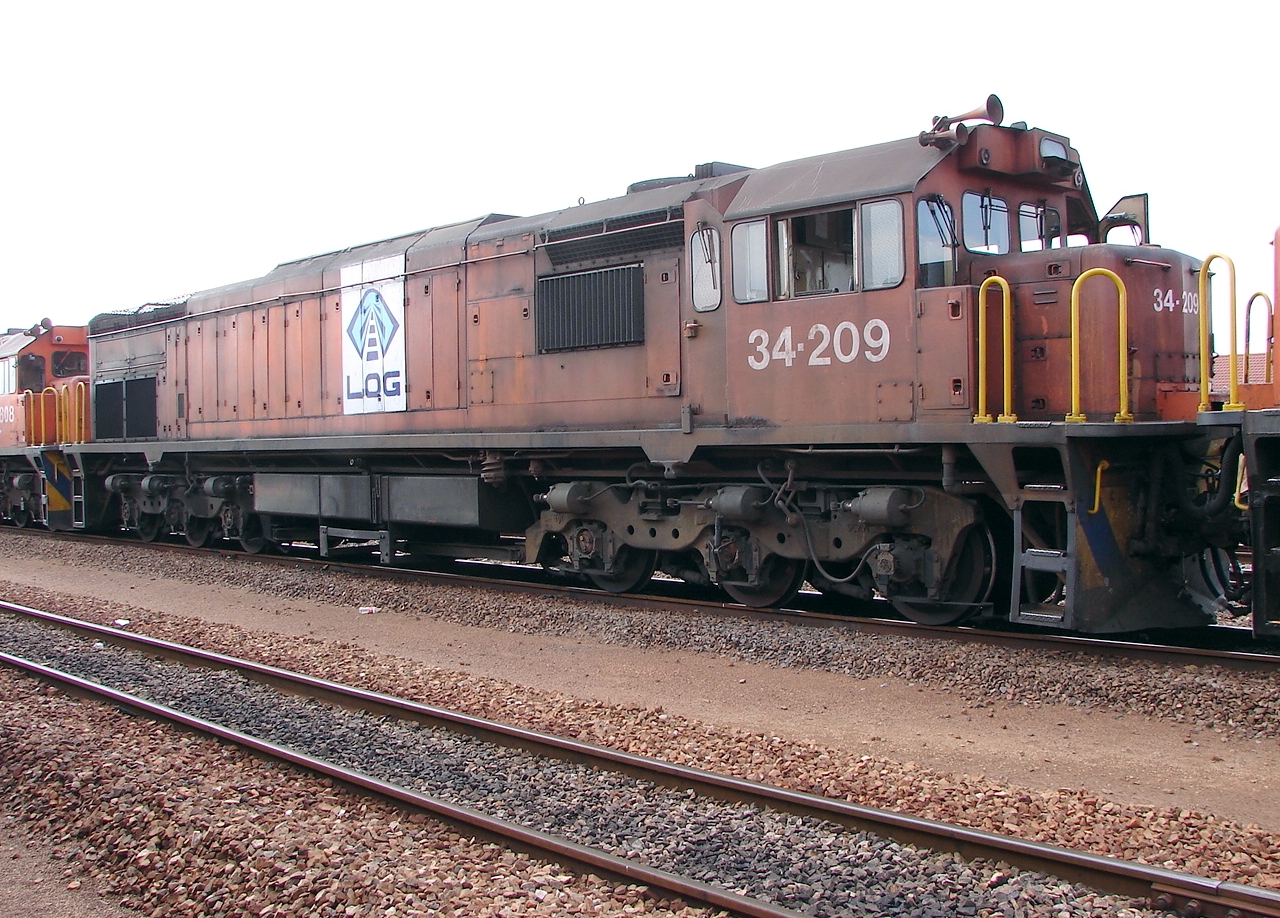
SAR Class 34-200 34-209, in Koedoespoort, Pretoria, 2009.

The Pretoria–Maputo railway has six important branches:

- Kaapmuiden–Barberton branch: connects the town of Kaapmuiden to the town of Barberton.
- Burgersfort branch: connects the town of Belfast to the mines of Tubatse Ferrochrome.
- Middelburg branch: connects the town of Middelburg to the town of Roossenekal (mines of Mapochs Magnetite Iron).
- Cullinan branch: connects the town of Rayton to the Cullinan Diamond Mine.
- Tshwane branch: in the city of Tshwane to the town of Ekangala.
- Koedoespoort maneuver and repair rail branch: in the city of Pretoria.

== Railway connections ==
In Maputo, the Pretoria–Maputo line connects with the Limpopo railway and the Goba railway.

In Komatipoort, the Pretoria–Maputo line connects with the Komatipoort railway.

In Matsulu/Kaapmuiden, the Pretoria–Maputo line connects with the Morebeng–Matsulu railway.

In Machadodorp, the Pretoria–Maputo line connects with the Machadodorp–Ermelo railway.

In Wonderfontein, the Pretoria–Maputo line connects with the Koornfontein railway.

In Witbank, the Pretoria–Maputo line connects with the Witbank-Klipspruit railway.

In Pretoria, the Pretoria–Maputo line connects with the Sentrarand railway (Pretoria-Johannesburg Railway Arch) and Cape to Cairo Railway (known in the city as Metrorail Gauteng, part of south-eastern section of the Cape to Cairo Railway).

== Main railway stations ==
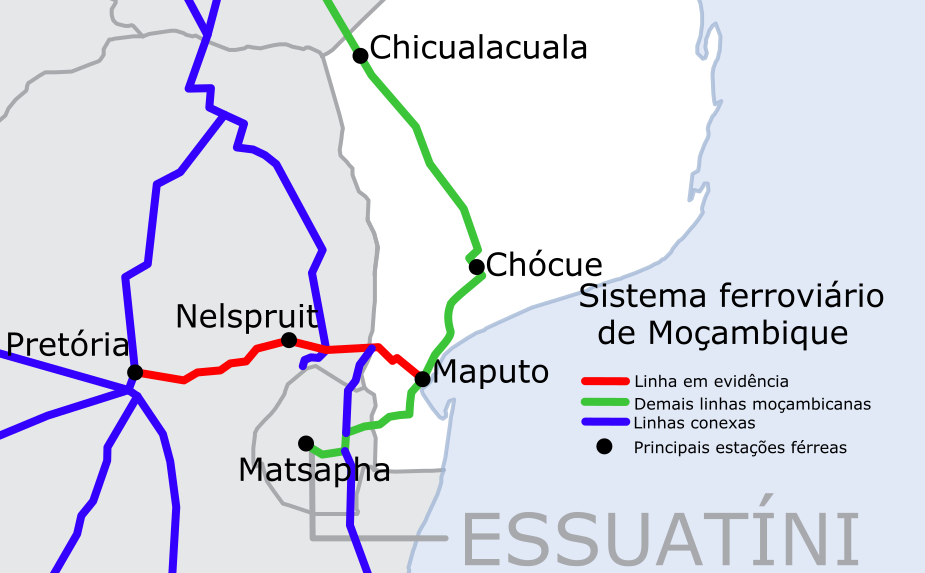
Pretoria–Maputo railway map (red line); railways with junction (in green); other railway routes (in blue).

The main railway stations of the Pretoria–Maputo railway are:

- Maputo
- Moamba
- Ressano Garcia
- Komatipoort
- Mbombela (Nelspruit)
- Machadodorp
- Belfast
- Middelburg
- Witbank
- Pretoria
