= Portuguese Mozambique =

1505–1975 Portuguese possession in East Africa

Coordinates: 25.9153°S 32.5764°E

Mozambique Moçambique (Portuguese) Names ↓
- 1505–1975
- Flag (1911–1975) Coat of arms (1951–1975)
- Anthem: Hymno Patriótico (1808–1834) (English: "Patriotic Anthem") Hino da Carta (1834–1910) (English: "Hymn of the Charter") A Portuguesa (1910–1975) (English: "The Portuguese")
- Location of Mozambique in Africa
- Status: Territory of the Portuguese Empire (1505–1951); Overseas province of Portugal (1951–1972); State of the Portuguese Empire (1972–1975)
- Capital: Cidade de Pedra (1507–1898); Lourenço Marques (1898–1975)
- Common languages: Portuguese
- Religion: Catholicism
- Head of state
  - 1505–1521: King Manuel I of Portugal and the Algarves
  - 1974–75: President Francisco da Costa Gomes
- Governor-General
  - 1505–1506: Pêro de Anaia (first)
  - 1974–75: Vítor Manuel Trigueiros Crespo (last)
- Historical era: Imperialism
  - Established: 1505
  - Independence of Mozambique: 25 June 1975

Population
  - 1967: 7,724,000
- Currency: Mozambican real (1852–1914); Mozambican escudo (1914–75)
- ISO 3166 code: MZ
Preceded by
Sultanate of Kilwa
Mutapa Empire
Maravi Empire
Kingdom of Barue
Gaza Empire
Angoche Sultanate
City-State of Inhambane
German East Africa
Succeeded by
People's Republic of Mozambique
- Today part of: Mozambique

Portuguese Mozambique (Portuguese: Moçambique Português) or Portuguese East Africa (África Oriental Portuguesa) were the common terms by which Mozambique was designated during the period in which it was a Portuguese overseas province. Portuguese Mozambique originally constituted a string of Portuguese possessions along the south-east African coast, and later became a unified province, which now forms the Republic of Mozambique.

Portuguese trading settlements—and later, territories—were formed along the coast and into the Zambezi basin from 1498 when Vasco da Gama first reached the Mozambican coast. Lourenço Marques explored the area that is now Maputo Bay in 1544. The Portuguese increased efforts to occupy the interior of the colony after the Scramble for Africa, and secured political control over most of its territory in 1918, facing the resistance of some Africans in the process. Some territories in Mozambique were handed over in the late 19th century for rule by chartered companies like the Mozambique Company (Companhia de Moçambique), which had the concession of the lands corresponding to the present-day provinces of Manica and Sofala, and the Niassa Company (Companhia do Niassa), which had controlled the lands of the modern provinces of Cabo Delgado and Niassa. The Mozambique Company relinquished its territories back to Portuguese control in 1942, unifying Mozambique under control of the Portuguese government.

The region as a whole was long termed "Portuguese East Africa", and was subdivided into a series of colonies extending from Lourenço Marques in the south to Niassa in the north. Cabo Delgado was initially merely a strip of territory along the Rovuma River, including Cape Delgado itself, which Portugal acquired out of German East Africa in 1919, but it was enlarged southward to the Lurio River to form what is now Cabo Delgado Province. In the Zambezi basin were the colonies of Quelimane (now Zambezia Province) and Tete (in the panhandle between Northern Rhodesia, now Zambia, and Southern Rhodesia, now Zimbabwe), which were for a time merged as Zambezia. The colony of Moçambique (now Nampula Province) had the Island of Mozambique as its capital. The island was also the seat of the Governor-General of Portuguese East Africa until the late 1890s, when that official was officially moved to the city of Lourenço Marques. Also in the south was the colony of Inhambane, which lay north-east of Lourenço Marques. Once these colonies were merged, the region as a whole became known as Moçambique.

According to the official policy of the Salazar regime, inspired by the concept of Lusotropicalismo, Mozambique was claimed as an integral part of the "pluricontinental and multiracial nation" of Portugal, as was done in all of its colonies to Europeanise the local population and assimilate them into Portuguese culture. This policy was largely unsuccessful, however, and African opposition to colonisation led to a ten-year independence war that culminated in the Carnation Revolution in Lisbon in April 1974 and the independence from Portugal in June 1975.

== Designation ==
During its history as a Portuguese colony, the present-day territory of Mozambique had the following formal designations:

- 1505–1569: Captaincy of Sofala (Portuguese: Capitania de Sofala); Dependency of the Portuguese State of India.
- 1569–1752: Captaincy of Mozambique and Sofala (Capitania de Moçambique e Sofala); Dependency of the Portuguese State of India.
- 1752–1836: Captaincy-General of Mozambique, Sofala and Rivers of Sena (Capitania-Geral de Moçambique, Sofala e Rios de Sena); Separate government, independent from that of the Portuguese State of India.
- 1836–1891: Province of Mozambique (Província de Moçambique)
- 1891–1893: State of Eastern Africa (Estado da África Oriental)
- 1893–1926: Province of Mozambique (Província de Moçambique)
- 1926–1951: Colony of Mozambique (Colónia de Moçambique)
- 1951–1972: Province of Mozambique (Província de Moçambique)
- 1973–1975: State of Mozambique (Estado de Moçambique)

== Overview ==
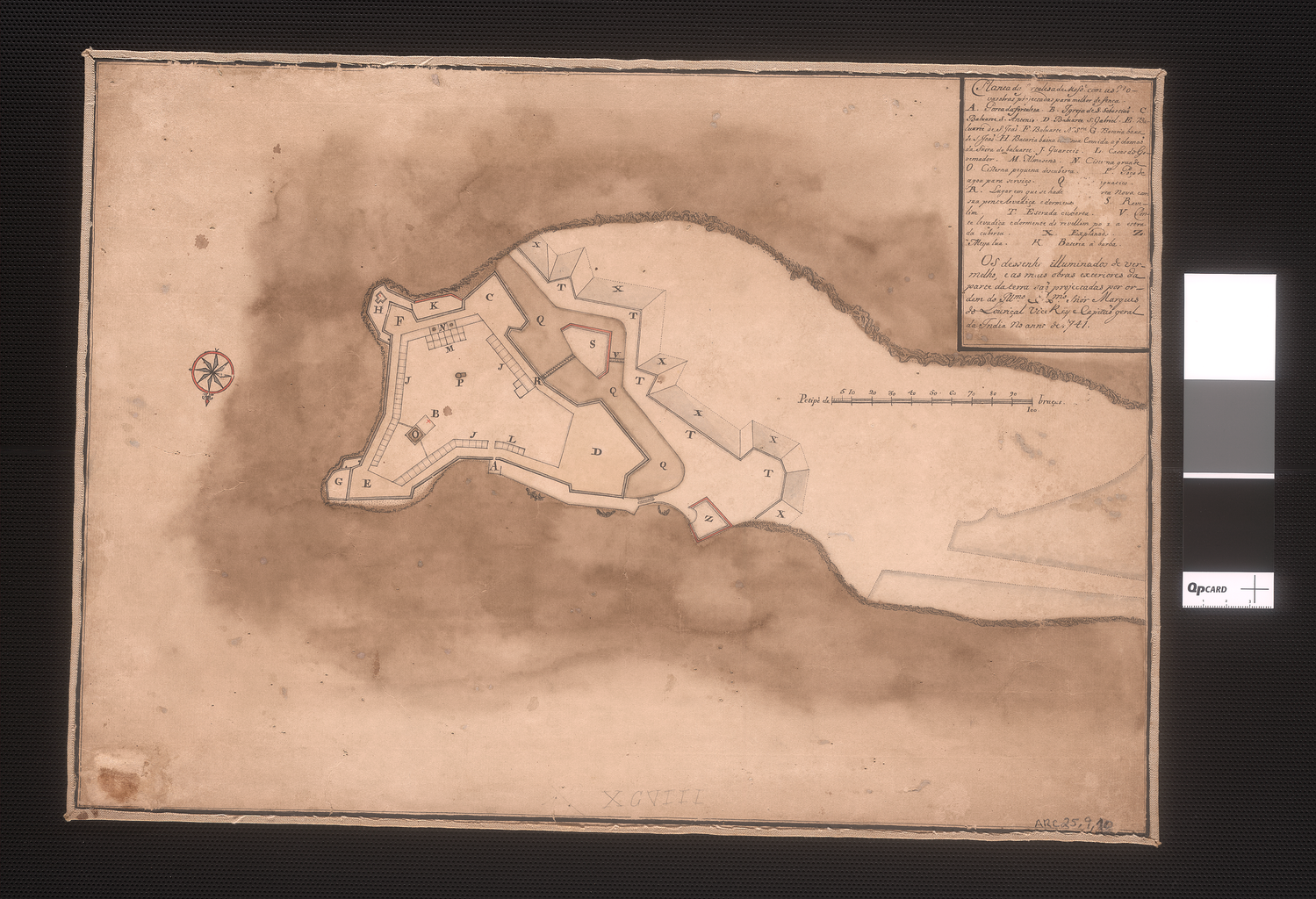
The Portuguese fortress São Sebastião on Mozambique Island.

Until the 20th century, the land and peoples of Mozambique were barely affected by the Europeans who came to its shores and entered its major rivers. As the Muslim traders, mostly Swahili, were displaced from their coastal centres and routes to the interior by the Portuguese, migrations of Bantu peoples continued and tribal federations formed and reformed as the relative power of local chiefs changed. For four centuries the Portuguese presence was meagre. Coastal and river trading posts were built, abandoned, and built again. Governors sought personal profits to take back to Portugal, and colonists were not attracted to the distant area with its relatively unattractive climate; those who stayed were traders who married local women and successfully maintained relations with local chiefs.

In Portugal, however, Mozambique was considered to be a vital part of a world empire. Periodic recognition of the relative insignificance of the revenues it could produce was tempered by the mystique which developed regarding the mission of the Portuguese to bring their civilisation to the African territory. It was believed that through missionary activity and other direct contact between Africans and Europeans, the Africans could be taught to appreciate and participate in Portuguese culture.

In the last decade of the 19th century and the first part of the 20th century, integration of Mozambique into the structure of the Portuguese nation was begun. After all of the area of the present province had been recognised by other European powers as belonging to Portugal, administrators waged wars against African polities to assert control over the territory. Civil administration was established throughout the area, the building of an infrastructure was begun, and agreements regarding the transit trade of Mozambique's land-locked neighbours to the west, such as Southern Rhodesia, Northern Rhodesia and Nyasaland, were made.

Colonial legislation discriminated against Africans on cultural grounds. Colonial legislation submitted Africans to forced labour, to pass laws and to segregation in schools. That most Africans were perceived to engage in "uncivilised behaviour" by the Portuguese created a low opinion of Africans as a group among Europeans. The uneducated Portuguese immigrant peasants in urban areas were frequently in direct competition with Africans for jobs and demonstrated jealousies and racial prejudice.

Between the urban and rural sectors of the society lied a steadily increasing group of Africans who were loosening their ties with rural villages and starting to participate in the urban economy, to settle in suburbs, and to adopt European customs. Members of this group would later become active participants in the independence movement.

== History ==
When Portuguese explorers reached East Africa in 1498, Swahili commercial settlements had existed along the Swahili Coast and outlying islands for several centuries. From about 1500, Portuguese trading posts and forts became regular ports of call on the new route to the east.

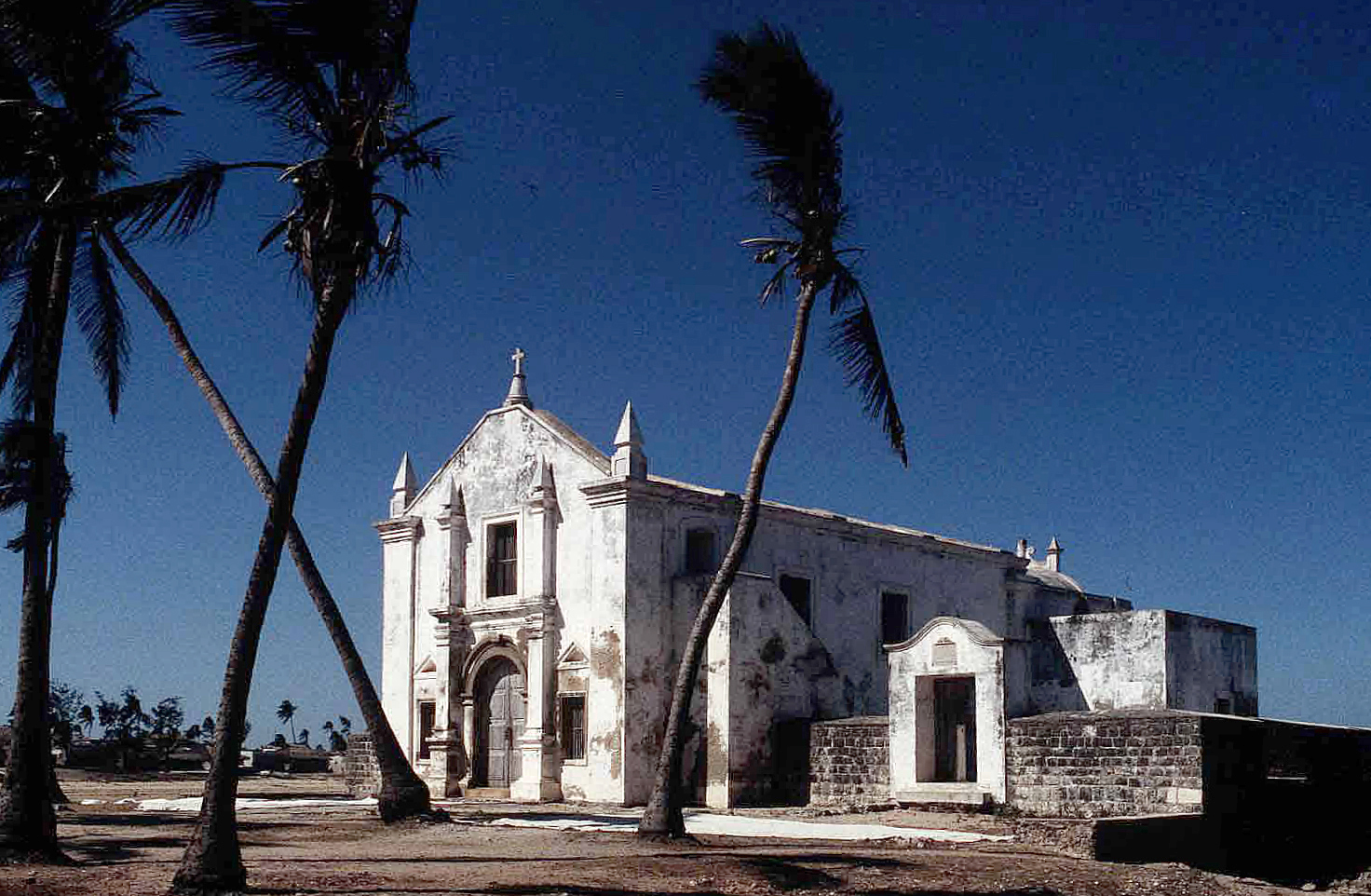
The Island of Mozambique was first occupied by Portuguese explorers in the late 15th century. They quickly established a fort there, and with time a community sprang up and achieved importance as port of call, missionary base and a trading centre. The island is now a UNESCO World Heritage Site.

The voyage of Vasco da Gama around the Cape of Good Hope into the Indian Ocean in 1498 marked the Portuguese entry into trade, politics, and society in the Indian Ocean world. The Portuguese gained control of the Island of Mozambique and the port city of Sofala in the early 16th century. Vasco da Gama having visited Mombasa in 1498 was then successful in reaching India thereby permitting the Portuguese to trade with the Far East directly by sea, thus challenging older trading networks of mixed land and sea routes, such as the spice trade routes that used the Persian Gulf, Red Sea and caravans to reach the eastern Mediterranean.

The Republic of Venice had gained control over much of the trade routes between Europe and Asia. After traditional land routes to India had been closed by the Ottoman Turks, Portugal hoped to use the sea route pioneered by da Gama to break the Venetian trading monopoly. Initially, Portuguese rule in East Africa focused mainly on a coastal strip centred in Mombasa. With voyages led by Vasco da Gama, Francisco de Almeida and Afonso de Albuquerque, the Portuguese dominated much of southeast Africa's coast, including Sofala and Kilwa, by 1515. Their main goal was to dominate trade with India. As the Portuguese settled along the coast, they made their way into the hinterland as sertanejos (backwoodsmen). These sertanejos lived alongside Swahili traders and even took up service among Shona kings as interpreters and political advisors. One such sertanejo managed to travel through almost all the Shona kingdoms, including the Mutapa Empire's (Mwenemutapa) metropolitan district, between 1512 and 1516.

By the 1530s, small groups of Portuguese traders and prospectors penetrated the interior regions seeking gold, where they set up garrisons and trading posts at Sena and Tete on the Zambezi River and tried to gain exclusive control over the gold trade. The Portuguese finally entered into direct relations with the Mwenemutapa in the 1560s.

Portuguese activity in Zimbabwe, Zambezia and adjacent regions, c. 1500-1700.

They recorded a wealth of information about the Mutapa kingdom as well as its predecessor, Great Zimbabwe. According to Swahili traders whose accounts were recorded by the Portuguese historian João de Barros, Great Zimbabwe was an ancient capital city built of stones of marvellous size without the use of mortar. And while the site was not within Mutapa's borders, the Mwenemutapa kept noblemen and some of his wives there.

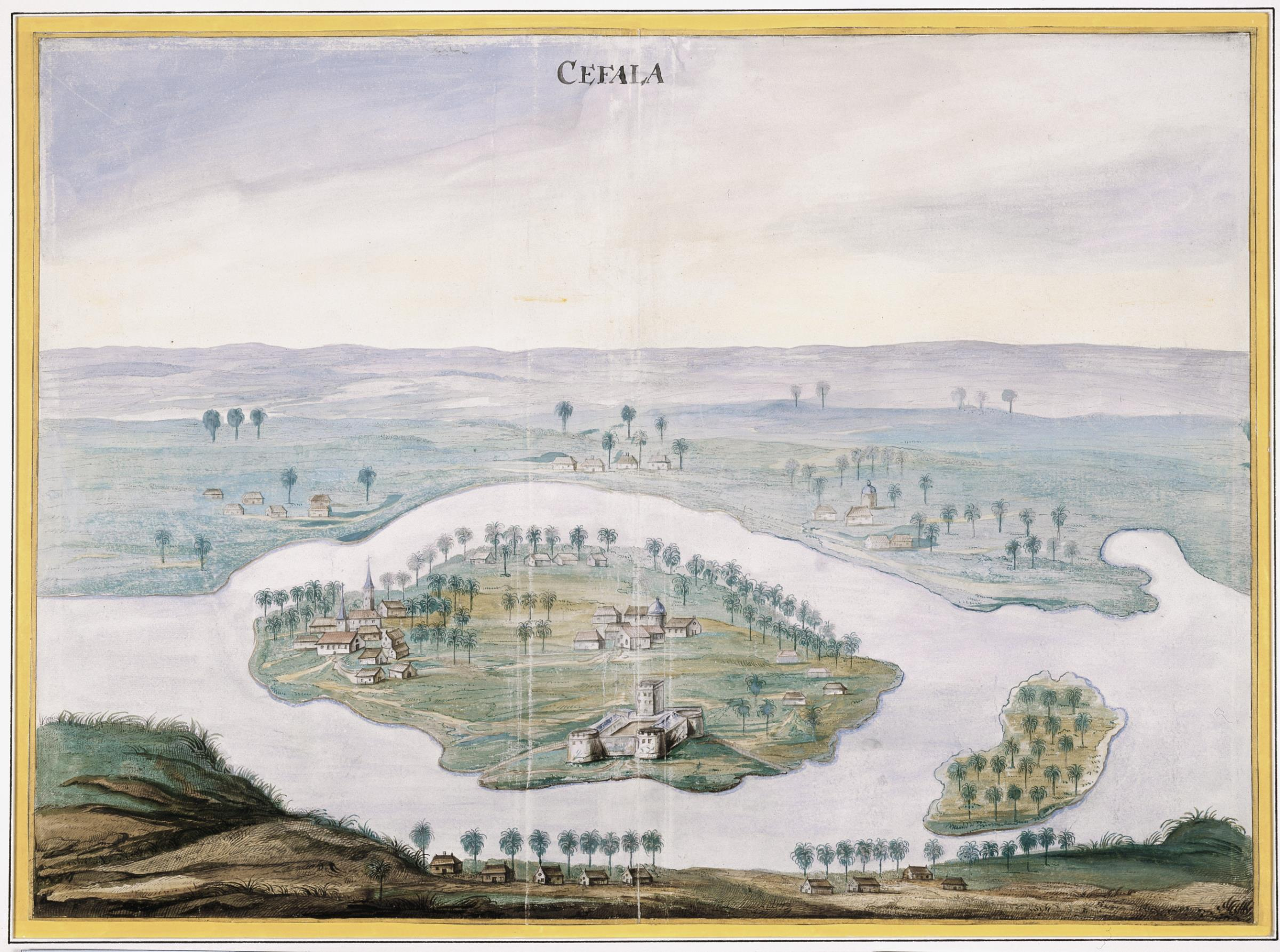
Painting by Johannes Vingboons of Sofala, c. 1665

The Portuguese attempted to legitimate and consolidate their trade and settlement positions through the creation of prazos (land grants) tied to Portuguese settlement and administration. While prazos were originally developed to be held by Portuguese, through intermarriage they became African Portuguese or African Indian centres defended by large African slave armies known as Chikunda. Historically, within Mozambique, there was slavery. Human beings were bought and sold by African tribal chiefs, Arab traders, and the Portuguese. Many Mozambican slaves were supplied by tribal chiefs who raided warring tribes and sold their captives to the prazeiros.

Although Portuguese influence gradually expanded, its power was limited and exercised through individual settlers and officials who were granted extensive autonomy. The Portuguese were able to wrest much of the coastal trade from Arabs between 1500 and 1700, but, with the Arab seizure of Portugal's key foothold at Fort Jesus on Mombasa Island (now in Kenya) in 1698, the pendulum began to swing in the other direction. As a result, investment lagged while Lisbon devoted itself to the more lucrative trade with India and the Far East and to the colonisation of Brazil. During the 18th and 19th centuries, the Mazrui and Omani Arabs reclaimed much of the Indian Ocean trade, forcing the Portuguese to retreat south. Many prazos had declined by the mid-19th century, but several of them survived.

During the 19th century, other European powers, particularly the British and the French, became increasingly involved in the trade and politics of the region. In the Island of Mozambique, the hospital, a majestic neo-classical building constructed in 1877 by the Portuguese, with a garden decorated with ponds and fountains, was for many years the biggest hospital south of the Sahara. The modern-day territory of Mozambique was formed during this century, with the Portuguese annexing or pacifying large swaths of land during the Portuguese campaigns of pacification and occupation. The Gaza Empire was annexed in 1895, and the pacification of the Zambezi valley followed, between 1895 and 1902, culminating in the Barue campaign. Northern Mozambique was the last part of the territory to be incorporated by the Portuguese. By the early 20th century the Portuguese had shifted the administration of part of Mozambique to private chartered companies, including the Mozambique Company, the Zambezia Company and the Niassa Company, which established several railroad lines to neighbouring countries. The companies, granted a charter by the Portuguese government to foster economic development and maintain Portuguese control in the territory's provinces, would lose their purpose when the territory was transferred to the control of the Portuguese colonial government between 1929 and 1942.

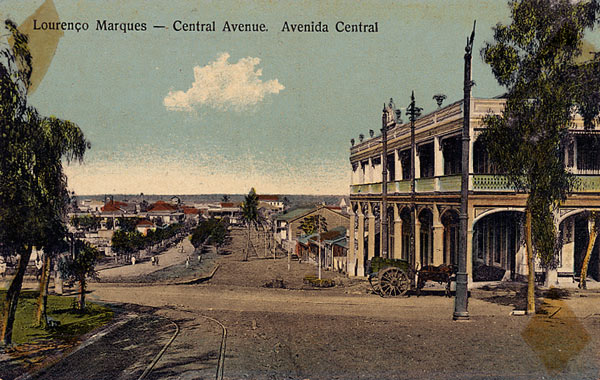
View of Lourenço Marques, ca. 1905

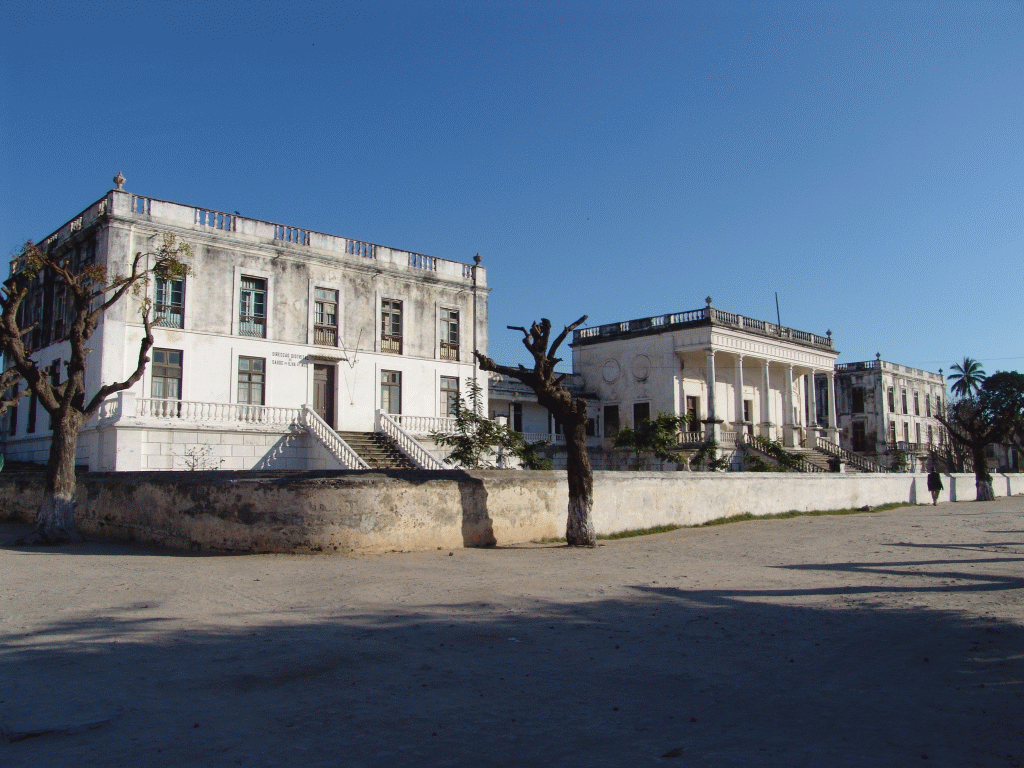
Former Portuguese administrative buildings and hospital, on Mozambique Island.

Although slavery had been legally abolished in Mozambique by the Portuguese colonial authorities, at the end of the 19th century the Chartered companies enacted a forced labour policy and supplied cheap – often forced – African labour to the mines and plantations of other European colonies in Africa. The Zambezia Company, the most profitable chartered company, took over a number of smaller prazeiro holdings and requested Portuguese military outposts to protect its property. The chartered companies and the Portuguese administration built roads and ports to bring their goods to market including a railway linking Southern Rhodesia with the Mozambican port of Beira. However, the development's administration gradually started to pass directly from the trading companies to the Portuguese government itself.

Because of their unsatisfactory performance and because of the shift, under the Estado Novo regime of Oliveira Salazar, towards a stronger Portuguese control of the Portuguese Empire's economy, the companies' concessions were not renewed when they ran out. This was what happened in 1942 with the Mozambique Company, which, however, continued to operate in the agricultural and commercial sectors as a corporation, and had already happened in 1929 with the termination of the Niassa Company's concession.

In the 1950s, the Portuguese overseas colony was rebranded an overseas province of Portugal, and by the early 1970s, it was officially upgraded to the status of Portuguese non-sovereign state, by which it would remain a Portuguese territory but with a wider administrative autonomy. The Front for the Liberation of Mozambique (FRELIMO), initiated a guerrilla campaign against Portuguese rule in September 1964. This conflict, along with the two others already initiated in the other Portuguese colonies of Angola and Guinea, became part of the so-called Portuguese Colonial War (1961–74). From a military standpoint, the Portuguese regular army held the upper hand during all of the conflicts against the independentist guerrilla forces, which created favourable conditions for social development and economic growth until the end of the conflict in 1974.

After ten years of sporadic warfare and after Portugal's return to democracy through a leftist military coup in Lisbon which replaced Portugal's Estado Novo regime in favour of a military junta (the Carnation Revolution of April 1974), FRELIMO took control of the territory. The talks that led to an agreement on Mozambique's independence, signed in Lusaka, were started. Within a year, almost the entire ethnic Portuguese population had left, many were killed or fleeing in fear of being killed (in mainland Portugal they were known as retornados); others were expelled by the ruling power of the newly independent territory. Mozambique became independent from Portugal on 25 June 1975.

== Government ==
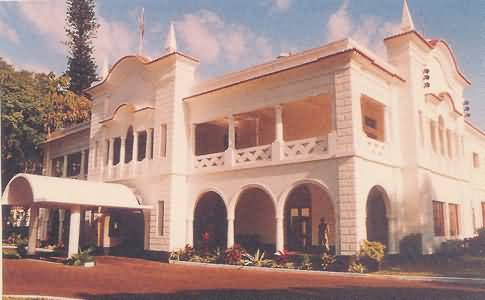
Ponta Vermelha Palace, former residence of the Portuguese governor and current presidential palace of Mozambique

Flag of the Portuguese governor of Mozambique.

At least since the early 19th century, the legal status of Mozambique always considered it as much a part of Portugal as Lisbon, but as a província ultramarina (overseas province) enjoyed special derogations to account for its distance from Europe.

From 1837, the highest government official in the province of Mozambique has always been the Governor-General, who reported directly to the Government in Lisbon, usually through the Minister of the Overseas. During some periods in the late 19th and the early 20th century, the governors-general of Mozambique received the status of royal commissioners or of high commissioners, which gave them extended executive and legislative powers, equivalent to those of a government minister.

In the 20th century, the province was also subject to the authoritarian Estado Novo regime that ruled Portugal from 1933 to 1974, until the military coup in Lisbon, known as the Carnation Revolution. Most members of the government of Mozambique were from Portugal, but a few were Africans. Nearly all members of the bureaucracy were from Portugal, as most Africans did not have the necessary qualifications to obtain positions.

The Government of Mozambique, like the Portuguese Government itself, was highly centralised. Power was concentrated in the executive branch, and all elections, where they occurred, were carried out using indirect methods. From the Prime Minister's office in Lisbon, authority extended down to the remotest posts and regedorias of Mozambique through a rigid chain of command. The authority of the government of Mozambique was residual, primarily limited to implementing policies already decided in Europe. In 1967, Mozambique also sent seven delegates to the National Assembly in Lisbon.

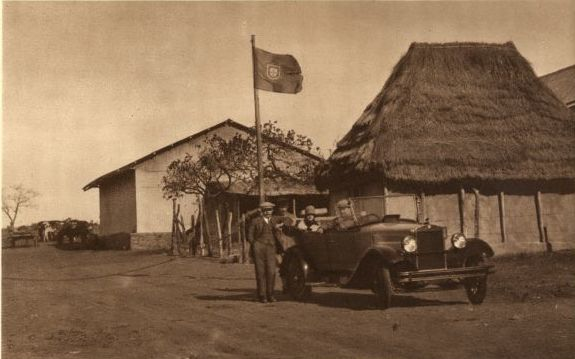
Goba border post between Portuguese East Africa (Mozambique) and British Swaziland.

The highest official in the province was the Governor-General, appointed by the Portuguese Council of Ministers on recommendation of the Overseas Minister. The Governor-General had both executive and legislative authority. A Government Council advised the Governor-General in the running of the province. The functional cabinet consisted of five secretaries appointed by the Overseas Minister on the advice of the Governor-General. A Legislative Council had limited powers and its main activity was approving the provincial budget. Finally, an Economic and Social Council had to be consulted on all draft legislation, and the Governor-General had to justify his decision to Lisbon if he ignored its advice.

Mozambique was divided into nine districts, which were further subdivided into 61 municipalities (concelhos) and 33 circumscriptions (circunscrições). Each subdivision was then made up of three or four individual posts, 166 in all with an average of 40,000 Africans in each. Each district, except Lourenço Marques which was run by the Governor-General, was overseen by a governor. Most Africans only had contact with the Portuguese through the post administrator, who was required to visit each village in his domain at least once a year.

The lowest level of administration was the regedoria, settlements inhabited by Africans living according to customary law. Each regedoria was run by a regulo, an African or Portuguese official chosen on the recommendation of local residents. Under the regulos, each village had its own African headman.

Each level of government could also have an advisory board or council. They were established in municipalities with more than 500 electors, in smaller municipalities or circumscriptions with more than 300 electors, and in posts with more than 20 electors. Each district also had its own board as well.

Two legal systems were in force — Portuguese civil law and African customary law. Until 1961, Africans were considered to be Natives (indígenas), rather than citizens. After 1961, the previous native laws were repealed and Africans gained de facto Portuguese citizenship.

== Geography ==
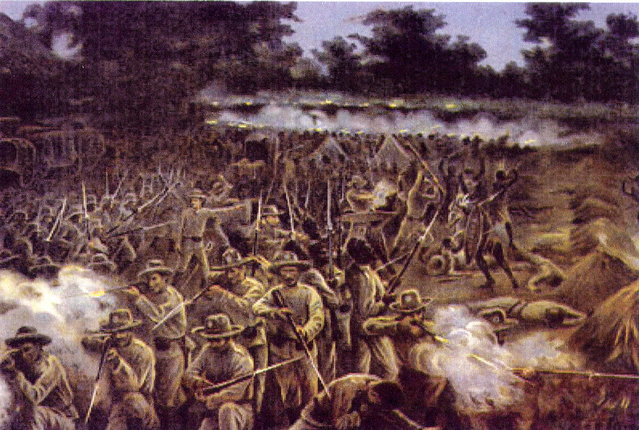
Marracuene was the site of a decisive battle between Portuguese and King Gungunhana of Gaza in 1895.

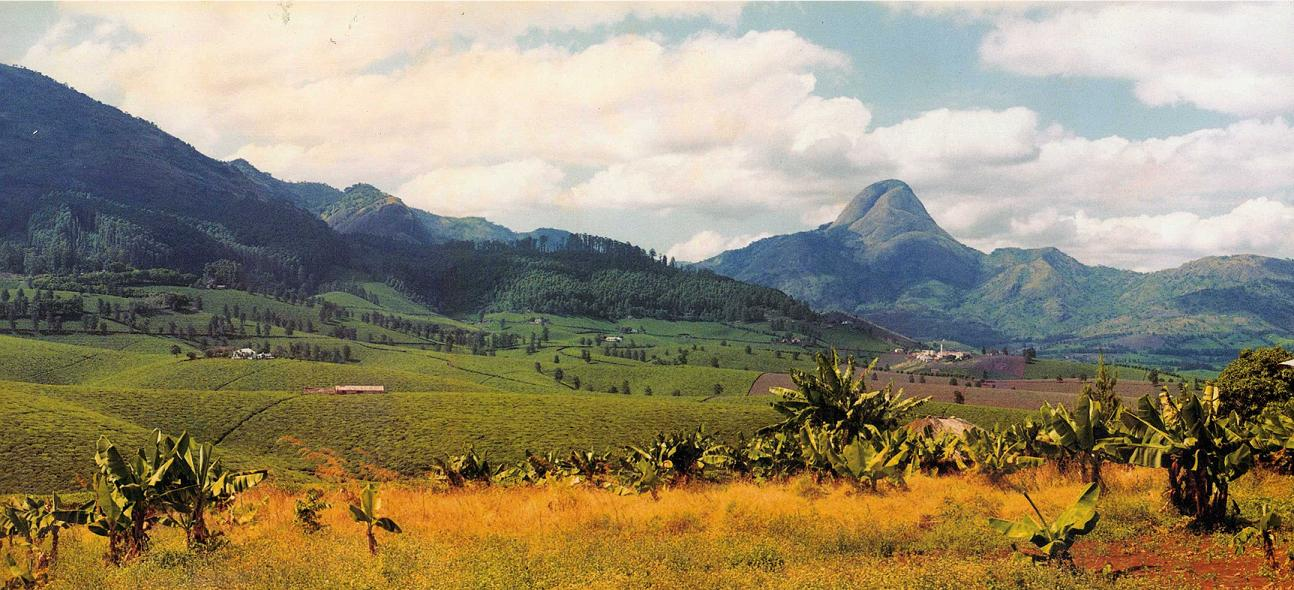
Mount Murresse in Gurué (tea plantation).

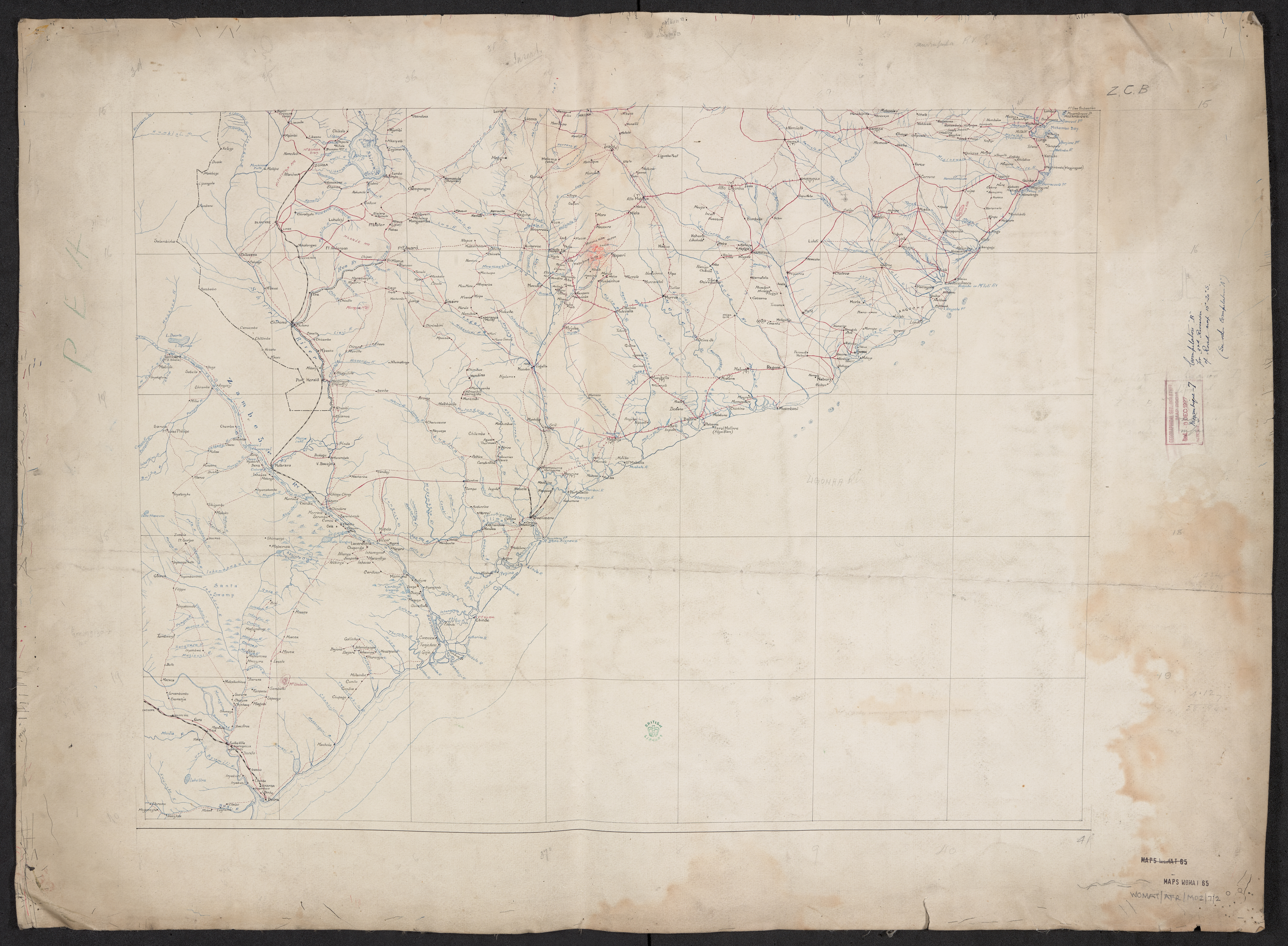
Military road map of Portuguese Mozambique

Portuguese East Africa was located in south-eastern Africa. It was a long coastal strip with Portuguese strongholds, from current day Tanzania and Kenya, to the south of current-day Mozambique.

In 1900, the part of modern Mozambique northwest of the Zambezi and Shire Rivers was called Moçambique; the rest of it was Lourenço Marques. Various districts existed, and even issued stamps, during the first part of the century, including Inhambane, Lourenço Marques, Mozambique Colony, Mozambique Company, Nyassa Company, Quelimane, Tete, and Zambésia. The Nyassa Company territory is now Cabo Delgado and Niassa.

In the early- and mid-20th century, a number of changes occurred. Firstly, on 28 June 1919, the Treaty of Versailles transferred the Kionga Triangle, a 1,000 km^{2} (390 sq mi) territory south of the Rovuma River from German East Africa to Mozambique.

During World War II, the Charter of the Mozambique Company expired, on 19 July 1942; its territory, known as Manica and Sofala, became a district of Mozambique. Mozambique was constituted as four districts on 1 January 1943 — Manica and Sofala, Niassa, Sul do Save (South of the Save River), and Zambézia.

On 20 October 1954, administrative reorganization caused Cabo Delgado and Mozambique districts to be split from Niassa. At the same time, the Sul do Save district was divided into Gaza, Inhambane and Lourenço Marques, while the Tete district was split from Manica and Sofala.

By the early 1970s, Mozambique was bordering the Mozambique Channel, bordering the countries of Malawi, Rhodesia, South Africa, Swaziland, Tanzania, and Zambia. Covering a total area of 801,590 km^{2}(309,500 square miles, about the size of Turkey). With a tropical to subtropical climate, the Zambezi flows through the north-central and most fertile part of the country. Its coastline had 2,470 km (1,530 miles), with 4,571 km (2,840 miles) of land boundaries, its highest point at Monte Binga (2,436 metres, 7,992 ft). The Gorongosa National Park, founded in 1920, was the main natural park in the territory.

The districts with their respective capitals were:

- Lourenço Marques — Lourenço Marques;
- Gaza — João Belo;
- Inhambane — Inhambane;
- Beira — Beira;
- Vila Pery — Vila Pery;
- Tete — Tete
- Zambézia — Quelimane;
- Moçambique — Nampula
- Cabo Delgado — Porto Amélia;
- Niassa — Vila Cabral

Other important urban centres included Sofala, Nacala, António Enes, Island of Mozambique and Vila Junqueiro.

== Demographics ==
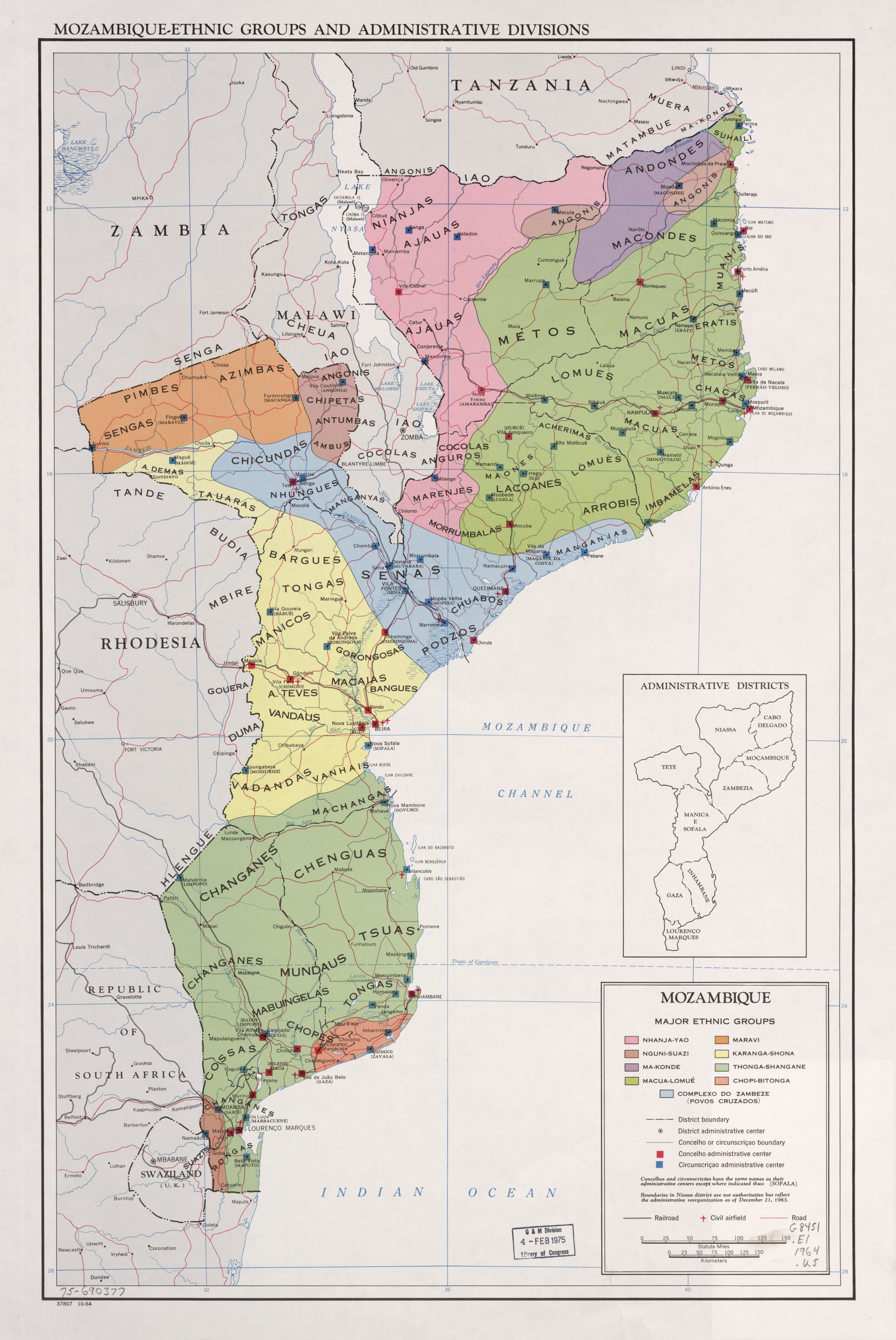
Administrative divisions and ethnic groups of Portuguese Mozambique, 1964

At close to the eve of independence in 1973 there were 200,000 white settlers in Mozambique making it smaller than Angola in terms of its settler population. The colony experienced a sizable level of growth in terms of its settler population in the 20th century which was during a period of sizable immigration for Portugal; with a small number of them coming to Mozambique.

By 1970, the Portuguese Overseas Province of Mozambique had about 8,168,933 inhabitants. Nearly 300,000 were white ethnic Portuguese. There was a number of mulattoes, from both European and African ancestry, living across the territory. However, the vast majority of the population belonged to local tribal groups which included the Makua–Lomwe, the Shona and the Tsonga. Other ethnic minorities included British, Greeks, Chinese and Indians. Most inhabitants were black indigenous Africans with a diversity of ethnic and cultural backgrounds, ranging from Tsonga and Makonde to Yao or Shona peoples. The Makua were the largest ethnic group in the north. The Sena and Shona were prominent in the Zambezi valley, and the Tsonga dominated in the south. In addition, several other minority groups lived a tribal lifestyle across the territory.

Mozambique had around 250,000 Europeans in 1974 that made up around 3% of the population. Mozambique was cosmopolitan as it had Indian, Chinese, Greek and Anglophone communities (over 25,000 Indians and 5,000 Chinese by the early 1970s). The capital of Portuguese Mozambique, Lourenço Marques (Maputo), had a population of 355,000 in 1970 with around 100,000 Europeans. Beira had around 115,000 inhabitants at the time with around 30,000 Europeans. Most of the other cities ranged from 10 to 15% in the number of Europeans, win contrast with Portuguese Angola, where cities had European majorities ranging from 50% to 60%.

== Society ==
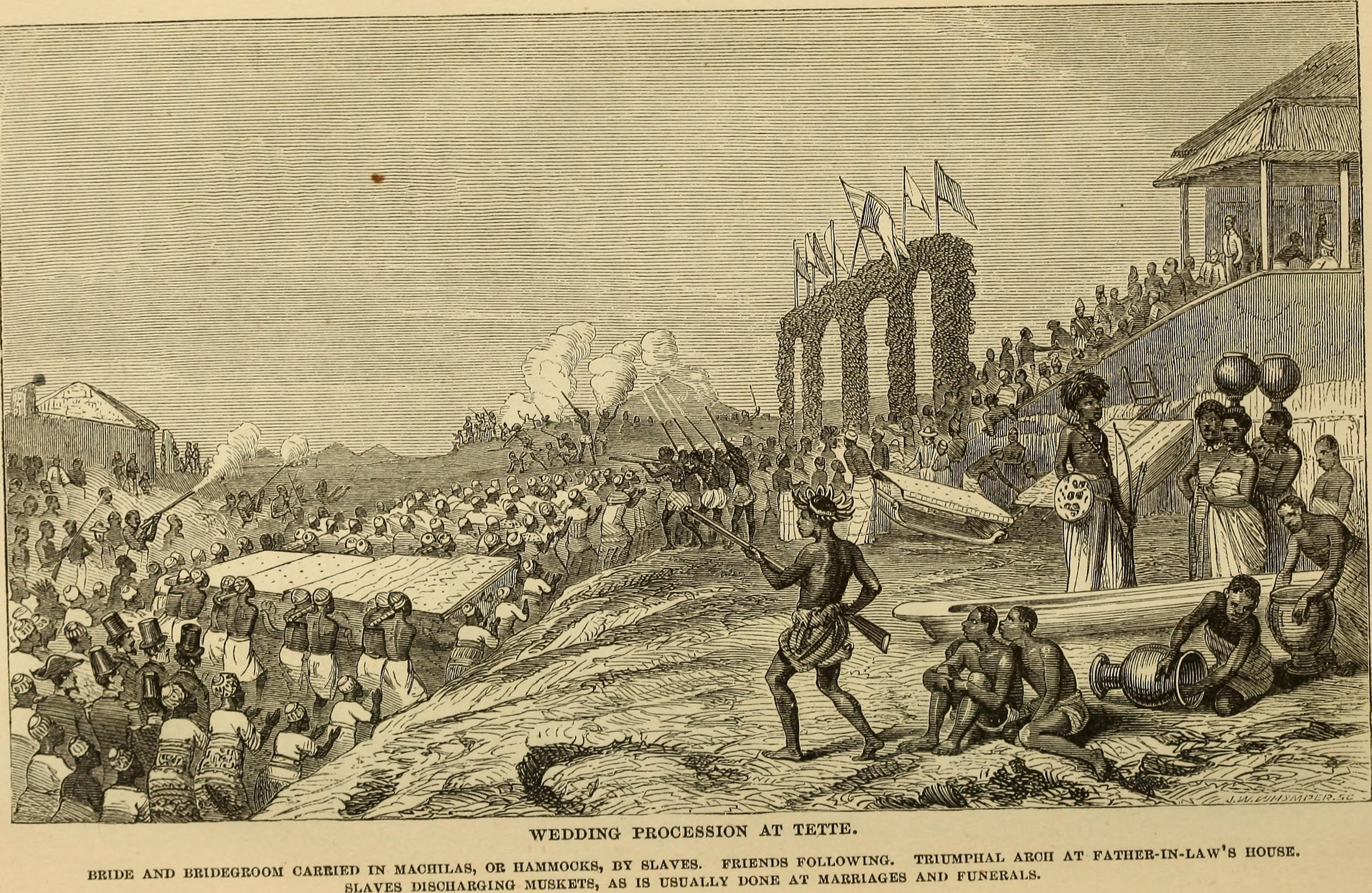
Wedding procession at Tete, from David Livingstone's Narrative of an Expedition to the Zambesi and its Tributaries

Starting in 1926, Portugal's colonial authorities abandoned conceptions of an innate inferiority of Africans, and set as their goal the development of a multiethnic society in its African colonies. The establishment of a dual, racialised civil society was formally recognised in Estatuto do Indigenato (The Statute of Indigenous Populations) adopted in 1929, which was based on the subjective concept of civilization versus tribalism. In the administration's view, the goal of civilising mission would only be achieved after a period of Europeanisation or enculturation of African communities.

The Estatuto established a distinction between the colonial citizens, subject to the Portuguese laws and entitled to all citizenship rights and duties effective in the metropole, and the indígenas (natives), subjected to colonial legislation and customary African laws. Between the two groups there was a third small group, the assimilados, comprising native blacks, mulatos, Asians, and mixed-race people, who had at least some formal education and not subjected to paid forced labour. They were entitled to some citizenship rights, and held a special identification card, used to control the movements of forced labour. The indígenas were subject to the traditional authorities, who were gradually integrated into the colonial administration and charged with solving disputes, managing the access to land, and guaranteeing the flows of workforce and the payment of taxes. As several authors have pointed out, the Indigenato regime was the political system that subordinated the immense majority of Africans to local authorities entrusted with governing, in collaboration with the lowest echelon of the colonial administration, the native communities described as tribes and assumed to have a common ancestry, language, and culture. The colonial use of traditional law and structures of power was thus an integral part of the process of colonial domination.

In the 1940s, the integration of traditional authorities into the colonial administration was deepened. The Portuguese colony was divided into concelhos (municipalities), in urban areas, governed by colonial and metropolitan legislation, and circunscrições (localities), in rural areas. The circunscrições were led by a colonial administrator and divided into regedorias (subdivisions of circunscrições), headed by régules (tribal chieftains), the embodiment of traditional authorities. Provincial Portuguese Decree No. 5.639, of July 29, 1944, attributed to régulos and their assistants, the cabos de terra, the status of auxiliares da administração (administrative assistants). Gradually, these traditional titles lost some of their content, and the régulos and cabos de terra came to be viewed as an effective part of the colonial state, remunerated for their participation in the collection of taxes, recruitment of the labour force, and agricultural production in the area under their control. Within the areas of their jurisdiction, the régulos and the cabos de terra also controlled the distribution of land and settled conflicts according to customary norms. To exercise their power, the régulos and cabos de terra had their own police force.

The indigenato regime was abolished in 1960. From then on, all Africans were de jure considered Portuguese citizens, and racial discrimination became a sociological rather than a legal feature of colonial society. In practice, however, citizenship for the African population did not materialise.

== Urban centres ==
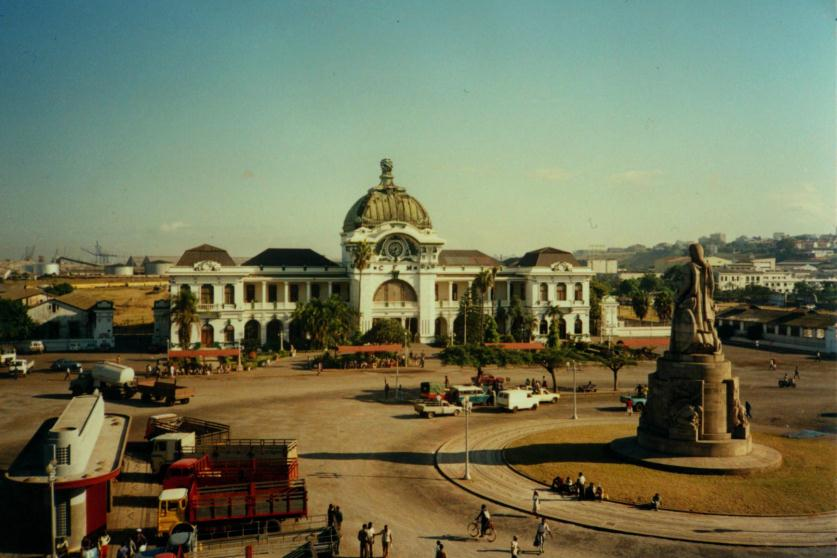
Central train station of Lourenço Marques (renamed as Maputo after independence from Portugal)

The largest coastal cities, the first founded or settled by Portuguese people since the 16th century, like the capital Lourenço Marques, Beira, Quelimane, Nacala and Inhambane, were modern cosmopolitan ports and a melting pot of several cultures, with a strong South African influence. The Southeast African and Portuguese cultures were dominant, but the influence of Arab, Indian, and Chinese cultures were also felt. The cuisine was diverse, owing especially to the Portuguese cuisine and Muslim heritage, and seafood was also quite abundant.

Lourenço Marques had always been a point of interest for artistic and architectural development since the first days of its urban expansion and this strong artistic spirit was responsible for attracting some of the world's most forward-thinking architects at the turn of the 20th century. The city was home to masterpieces of building work by, Pancho Guedes, Herbert Baker and Thomas Honney amongst others. The earliest architectural efforts around the city focused on classical European designs such as the Central Train Station (CFM) designed by architects Alfredo Augusto Lisboa de Lima, Mario Veiga and Ferreira da Costa and built between 1913 and 1916 (sometimes mistaken with the work of Gustav Eiffel), and the Hotel Polana designed by Herbert Baker.

Throughout the 1960s and early 1970s, Lourenço Marques was yet again at the centre of a new wave of architectural influences made most popular by Pancho Guedes. The designs of the 1960s and 1970s were characterised by modernist movements of clean, straight and functional structures. However, prominent architects such as Pancho Guedes fused this with local art schemes giving the city's buildings a unique Mozambican theme. As a result, most of the properties erected during the second construction boom take on these styling cues.

== Economy ==
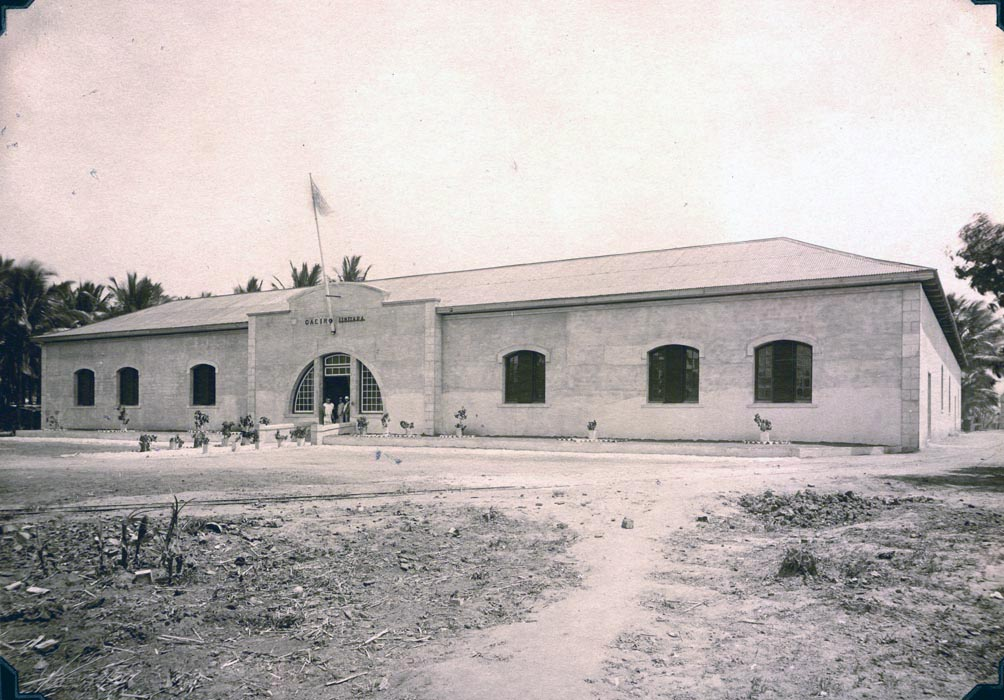
Caeiro Lda. Tobacco Factory.

Since the 15th century, Portugal founded settlements, trading posts, forts, and ports on the Sub-Saharan Africa's coast. Cities, towns, and villages were founded all over East African territories by the Portuguese, especially since the 19th century, like Lourenço Marques, Beira, Vila Pery, Vila Junqueiro, Vila Cabral and Porto Amélia. Others were expanded and developed greatly under Portuguese rule, like Quelimane, Nampula and Sofala. By this time, Mozambique had become a Portuguese colony, but the administration was left to the trading companies (like Mozambique Company and Niassa Company) who had received long-term leases from Lisbon.

Map of Portuguese East Africa, published and presented by The Lourenço Marques Port and Railways Administration, 1931.

By the mid-1920s, the Portuguese succeeded in creating a highly exploitative and coercive settler economy, in which African natives were forced to work on the fertile lands taken over by Portuguese settlers. Indigenous African peasants mainly produced cash crops designated for sale in the markets of the colonial metropole (the centre, i.e. Portugal). Major cash crops included cotton, cashews, tea and rice. This arrangement ended in 1932 after the takeover in Portugal by the new António de Oliveira Salazar's government — the Estado Novo. Thereafter, Mozambique, along with other Portuguese colonies, was put under the direct control of Lisbon. In 1951, it became an overseas province. The economy expanded rapidly during the 1950s and 1960s, attracting thousands of Portuguese settlers to the country. It was around this time that the first nationalist guerrilla groups began to form in Tanzania and other African countries. The strong industrial and agricultural development that did occur throughout the 1950s, 1960s and early 1970s was based on Portuguese development plans, and also included British and South African investment.

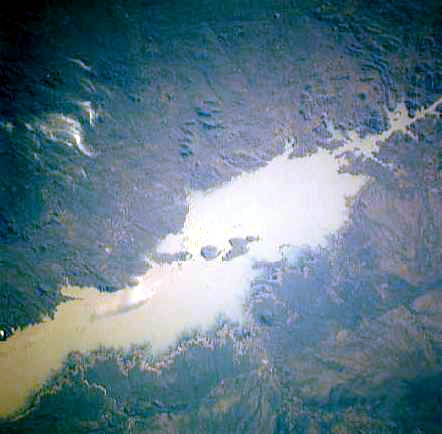
Cahora Bassa Dam reservoir — the dam began construction in 1969 and was at the time one of the biggest in all of Africa.

In 1959–60, Mozambique's major exports included cotton, cashew nuts, tea, sugar, copra and sisal. Other major agricultural productions included rice and coconut. The expanding economy of the Portuguese overseas province was fuelled by foreign direct investment, and public investment which included ambitious state-managed development plans. British capital owned two of the large sugar concessions (the third was Portuguese), including the famous Sena states. The Matola Oil Refinery, Procon, was controlled by Britain and the United States. In 1948 the petroleum concession was given to the Mozambique Gulf Oil Company. At Maotize, coal was mined; the industry was chiefly financed by Belgian capital. 60% of the capital of the Compagnie de Charbons de Mozambique was held by the Société Minière et Géologique Belge, 30% by the Mozambique Company, and the remaining 10% by the Government of the territory. Three banks were in operation, the Banco Nacional Ultramarino, Portuguese, Barclays Bank, D.C.O., British, and the Banco Totta e Standard de Moçambique (a partnership between Standard Bank of South Africa and mainland's Banco Totta & Açores). Nine out of the twenty-three insurance companies were Portuguese, which included insurance companies related to Fidelidade throughout its history. 80% of life assurance was in the hands of foreign companies which testifies to the openness of the economy.

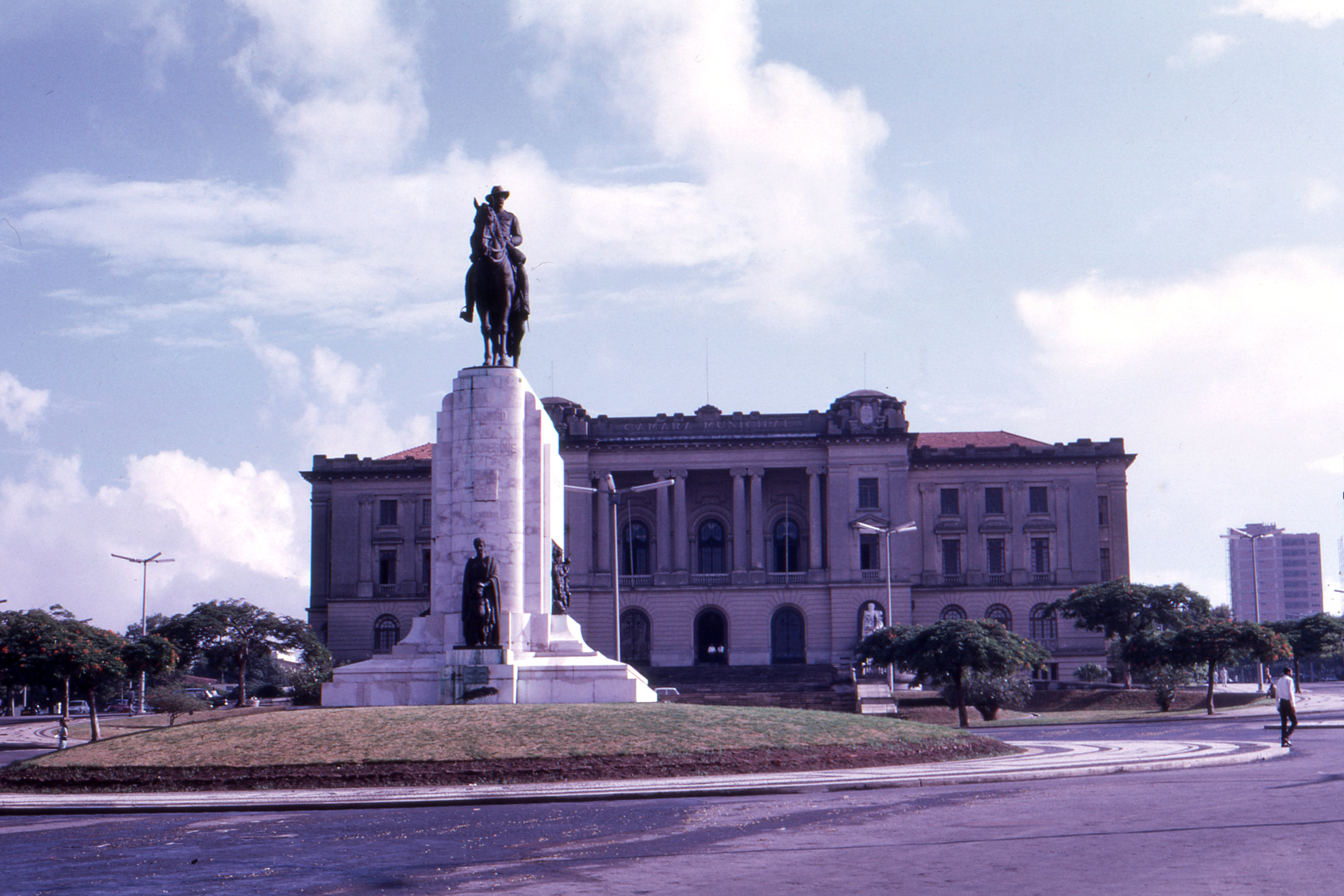
Mouzinho de Albuquerque Square (today Independence Square), Lourenço Marques (today Maputo), Portuguese Mozambique, 1971. The City Hall is in the background, and in front of it is the statue of Mouzinho de Albuquerque.

The Portuguese overseas province of Mozambique was the first territory of Portugal, including the European mainland, to distribute Coca-Cola. Lately the Lourenço Marques Oil Refinery was established by the Sociedade Nacional de Refinação de Petróleo (SONAREP) — a Franco-Portuguese syndicate. In the sisal plantations Swiss capital was invested, and in copra concerns, a combination of Portuguese, Swiss and French capital was invested. The large availability of capital from both Portuguese and international origin, allied to the wide range of natural resources and the growing urban population, lead to an impressive growth and development of the economy.

From the late stages of this notable period of high growth and huge development effort started in the 1950s, was the construction of Cahora Bassa dam by the Portuguese, which started to fill in December 1974 after construction was commenced in 1969. In 1971 construction work of the Massingir Dam began. At independence, Mozambique's industrial base was well-developed by Sub-Saharan Africa standards, thanks to a boom in investment in the 1960s and early 1970s. Indeed, in 1973, value added in manufacturing was the sixth highest in Sub-Saharan Africa.

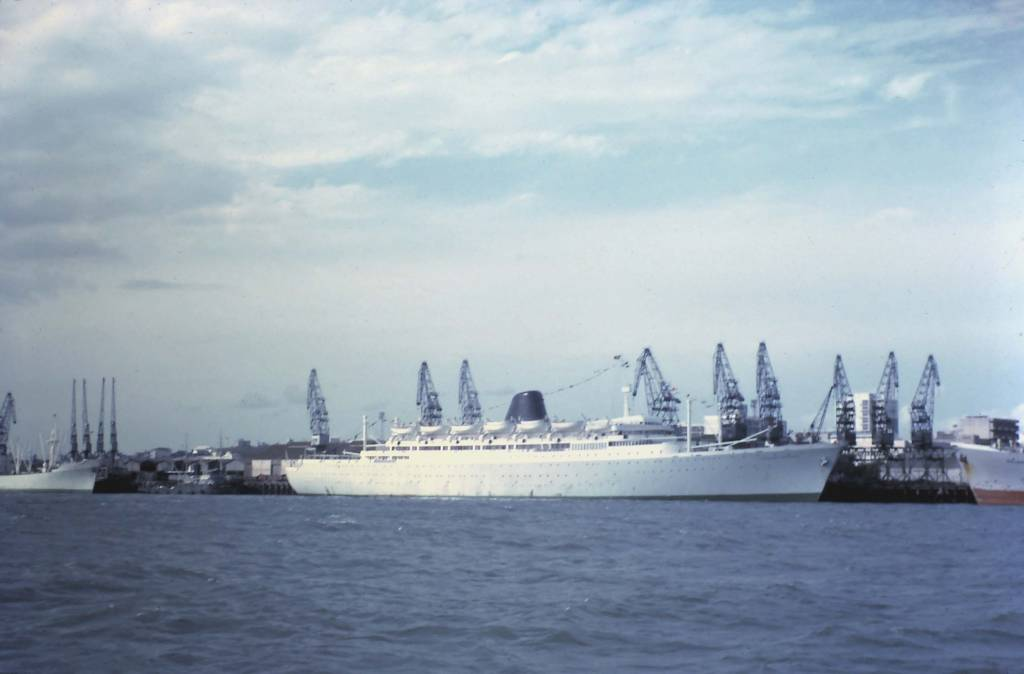
The Portuguese liner Príncipe Perfeito moored at Lourenço Marques, Portuguese Mozambique on December 25, 1967.

Economically, Mozambique was a source of agricultural raw materials and an earner of foreign exchange. It also provided a market for Portuguese manufacturers which were protected from local competition. Transportation facilities had been developed to exploit the transit trade of South Africa, Swaziland, Southern Rhodesia (which became Rhodesia in November 1965), Malawi, and Zambia, agricultural production for export purposes had been encouraged, and profitable arrangements for the export of labour had been made with neighbouring countries. Industrial production had been relatively insignificant but did begin to increase in the 1960s. The economic structure generally favoured the taking of some profits to Portugal rather than their total reinvestment in Mozambique because counterterrorism campaigns were expensive. The Portuguese economic interests in its overseas province, which dominated in banking, industry, and agriculture, exerted a powerful influence on policy and by early 1974 were fostering good levels of economic growth and development.

== Education ==
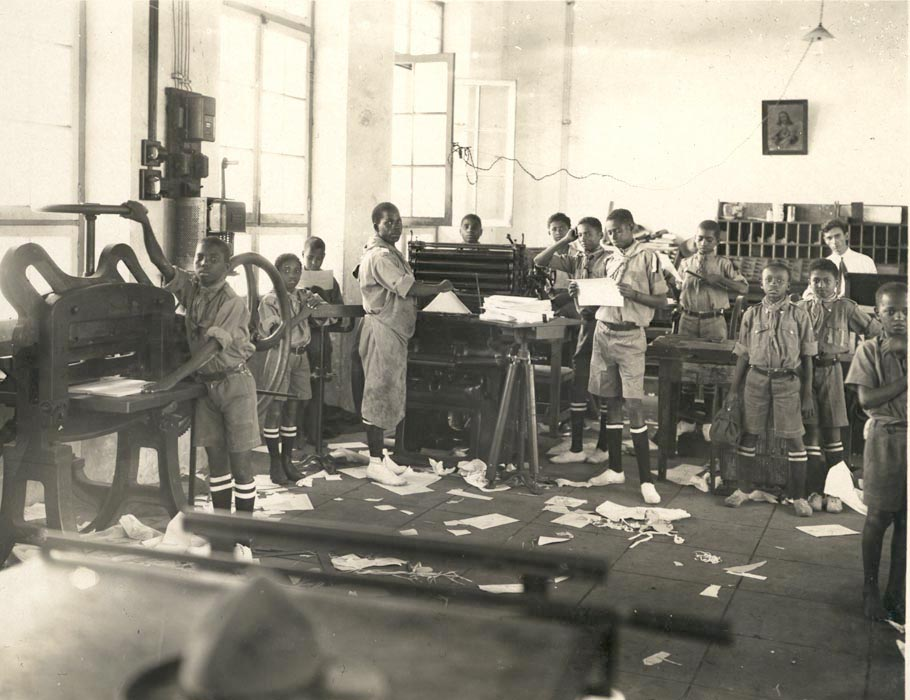
Portuguese language printing and typesetting class, 1930

Mozambique's rural population was largely illiterate. However, some thousands of Africans were educated in religion, the Portuguese language, and Portuguese history by Catholic and Protestant missionary schools established in cities and in the countryside.

In 1930, primary schooling became racially segregated. Africans who did not hold assimilated status had to enroll in "rudimentary schools," whereas whites and the few thousand assimilated Africans had access to "primary schools" of better quality.

Starting in the early 1940s, access to education was expanded in all levels. Nevertheless, "rudimentary schools" retained their poor quality. In 1956, there were 292,199 African students enrolled in first grade. Of these, only 9,486 had successfully passed third grade in 1959. By 1970, only 7.7% of Mozambique's population was literate.

A comprehensive network of secondary schools (the Liceus) and technical or vocational education schools were implemented across the cities and main towns of the territory. However, access to these institutions was largely limited to whites. In 1960, only 30 out of 1,000 students of the Liceu Salazar were Africans, in spite of whites making up only 2% of the Mozambican population.

In 1962, the first Mozambican university was founded by the Portuguese authorities: the Universidade de Lourenço Marques.

== Sports ==
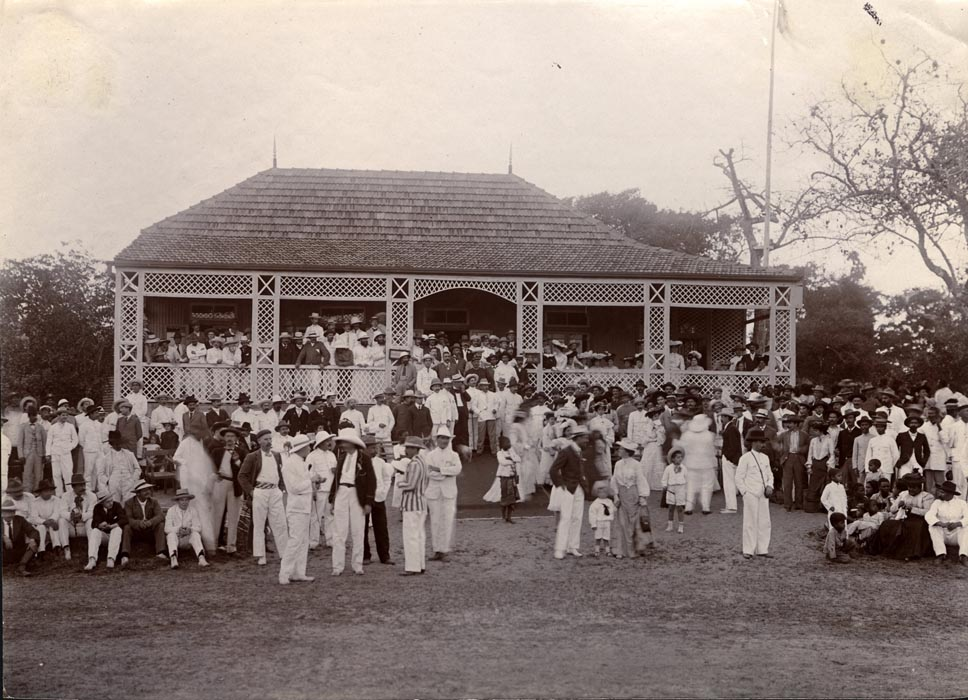
The Clube Sport da Beira in the city of Beira.

The Portuguese-ruled territory was introduced to several popular European and North American sports disciplines since the early urbanistic and economic booms of the 1920s and 1940s. This period was a time of city and town expansion and modernization that included the construction of several sports facilities for football, rink hockey, basketball, volleyball, handball, athletics, gymnastics, and swimming. Several sports clubs were founded across the entire territory, among them were some of the largest and oldest sports organizations of Mozambique like Sporting Clube de Lourenço Marques, that was established in 1920 and became the branch number 6 of Lisbon-based Sporting Clube de Portugal (Sporting CP). Other major sports clubs were founded in the following years like Grupo Desportivo de Lourenço Marques (1921), Clube Ferroviário de Lourenço Marques (1924), Sport Club de Vila Pery (1928), Clube Ferroviário da Beira (1943), Grupo Desportivo da Companhia Têxtil do Punguè (1943), Sport Lourenço Marques e Benfica (1955) and Grupo Desportivo e Recreativo Textáfrica (1957). Several sportsmen, especially football players, that achieved wide notability in Portuguese sports were from Mozambique and excelled in the Portugal national football team.

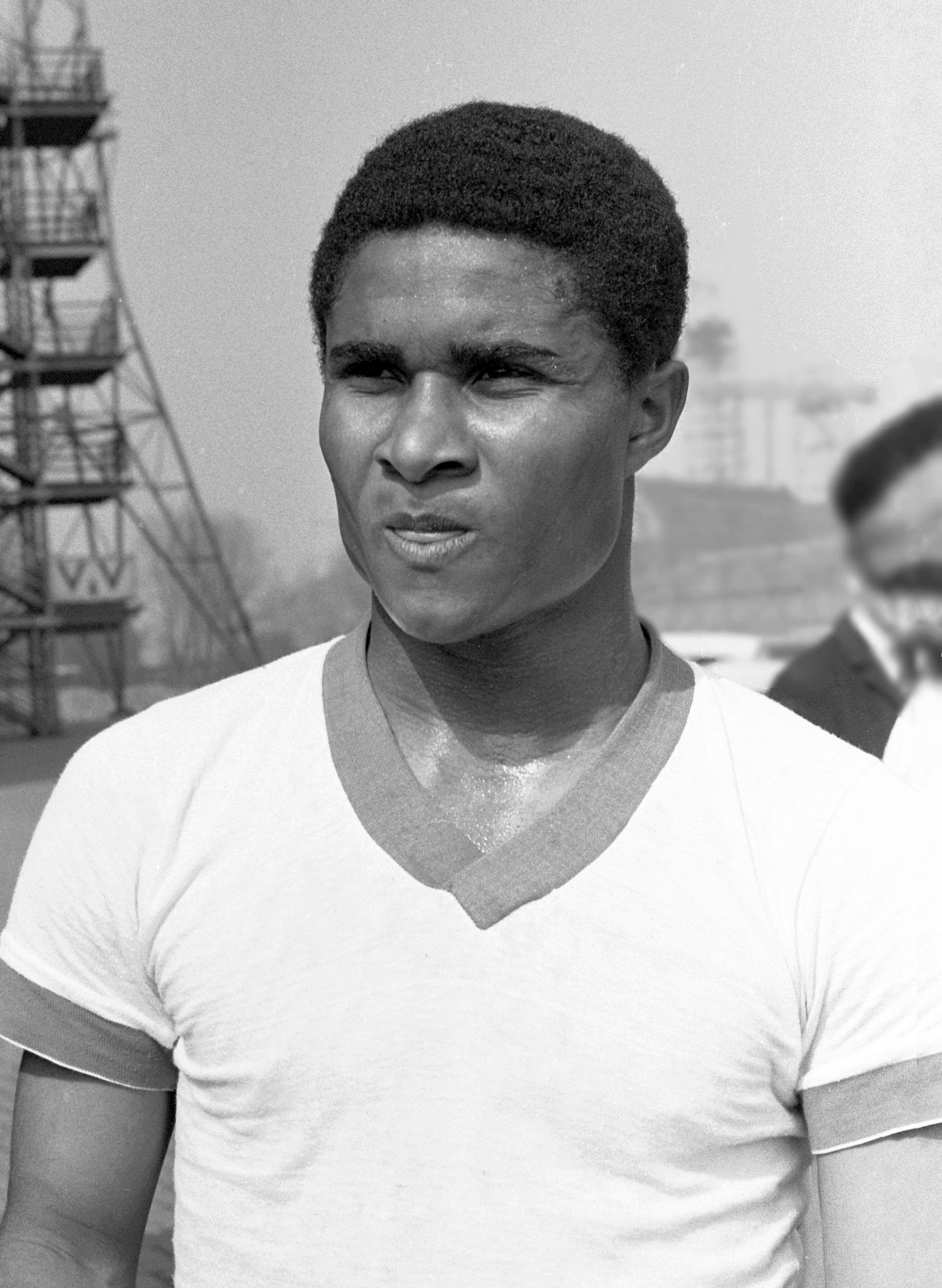
Eusébio da Silva Ferreira, a man born in Portuguese Mozambique who graduated as a footballer and played for Sporting Clube de Lourenço Marques at both youth level and the main squad between the ages of 15 and 18, became the most famous Portuguese sports star during the Estado Novo.

Football was a very popular sport in Portuguese Mozambique. The Portuguese enthusiasm for football led to the spread of the sport into its overseas territories. Eventually, Portugal would attempt to integrate their colonies, which would lead to them having many African players in the teams on the mainland. Introduced in the colonies as early as the 19th century, football became increasingly popular. Mozambique saw a sizable population of white Portuguese people immigrate there during the 20th century. This was a byproduct of the policies of the Estado Novo and how they saw their colonies. There was widespread infrastructure in Mozambique to prepare the players to play football professionally. This would allow many players from the colonies to easily play for the national teams. Starting in the 1950s, many black Africans from Portuguese Africa would sign for football teams on the mainland. The popularity of the game in the colonies also meant that there were many people who wanted to play it professionally. Many top players from Portuguese Mozambique represented Portugal at the international level, as well as playing for many clubs in the various tiers of the local, national and international leagues, most notably the likes of Matateu, Hilário, Costa Pereira, Coluna and Eusébio became highly regarded in the history of football in Portugal. But Eusébio's impact in Portuguese football stood out among them all to such an extent that when Eusébio arrived in Lisbon in December 1960 still as a player of Sporting Lourenço Marques, Lisbon-based Sporting CP had won ten league titles, which was as many as its rival SL Benfica's, and when, 15 years later, Eusébio, recognised as Benfica's best player of all time, left Benfica, Benfica had won 21 championships to just 14 for Sporting CP. Although being a black player from Mozambique, he is considered one of the greatest Portuguese football players ever. Eusébio's contribution to Portuguese football was tremendous, and his role in the 1966 FIFA World Cup is still remembered today as a significant milestone in Portugal's football history.

Since the 1960s, with the latest developments on commercial aviation, the highest ranked football teams of Mozambique and the other African overseas provinces of Portugal, started to compete in the Taça de Portugal (the Portuguese Cup) in football. This became also true for other sports, like basketball and rink hockey. Before the independence of Mozambique, Sporting Clube de Lourenço Marques won the Liga Portuguesa de Basquetebol three times, in 1968, 1971 and 1973, and the Desportivo de Lourenço Marques won the 1969, 1971 and 1973 Portuguese Roller Hockey First Division.

There were also several facilities and organizations for golf, tennis and wild hunting. The nautical sports were also well developed and popular, especially in Lourenço Marques, home to the Clube Naval de Lourenço Marques. The largest stadium was the Estádio Salazar, located near Lourenço Marques. Opened in 1968, it was at the time the most advanced in Mozambique conforming to standards set by both FIFA and the Union Cycliste Internationale (UCI). The cycling track could be adjusted to allow for 20,000 more seats.

Beginning in the 1950s, motorsport was introduced to Mozambique. At first race cars would compete in areas around the city, Polana and along the marginal but as funding and interest increased, a dedicated race track was built in the Costa Do Sol area along and behind the marginal with the ocean to the east with a length of 1.5 kilometres (0.93 miles). The initial surface of the new track, named Autódromo de Lourenço Marques did not provide enough grip and an accident in the late 1960s killed 8 people and injured many more. Therefore, in 1970, the track was renovated and the surface changed to meet the highest international safety requirements that were needed at large events with many spectators. The length then increased to 3,909 kilometres (2,429 miles). The city became host to several international and local events beginning with the inauguration on 26 November 1970.

== Carnation Revolution and independence ==
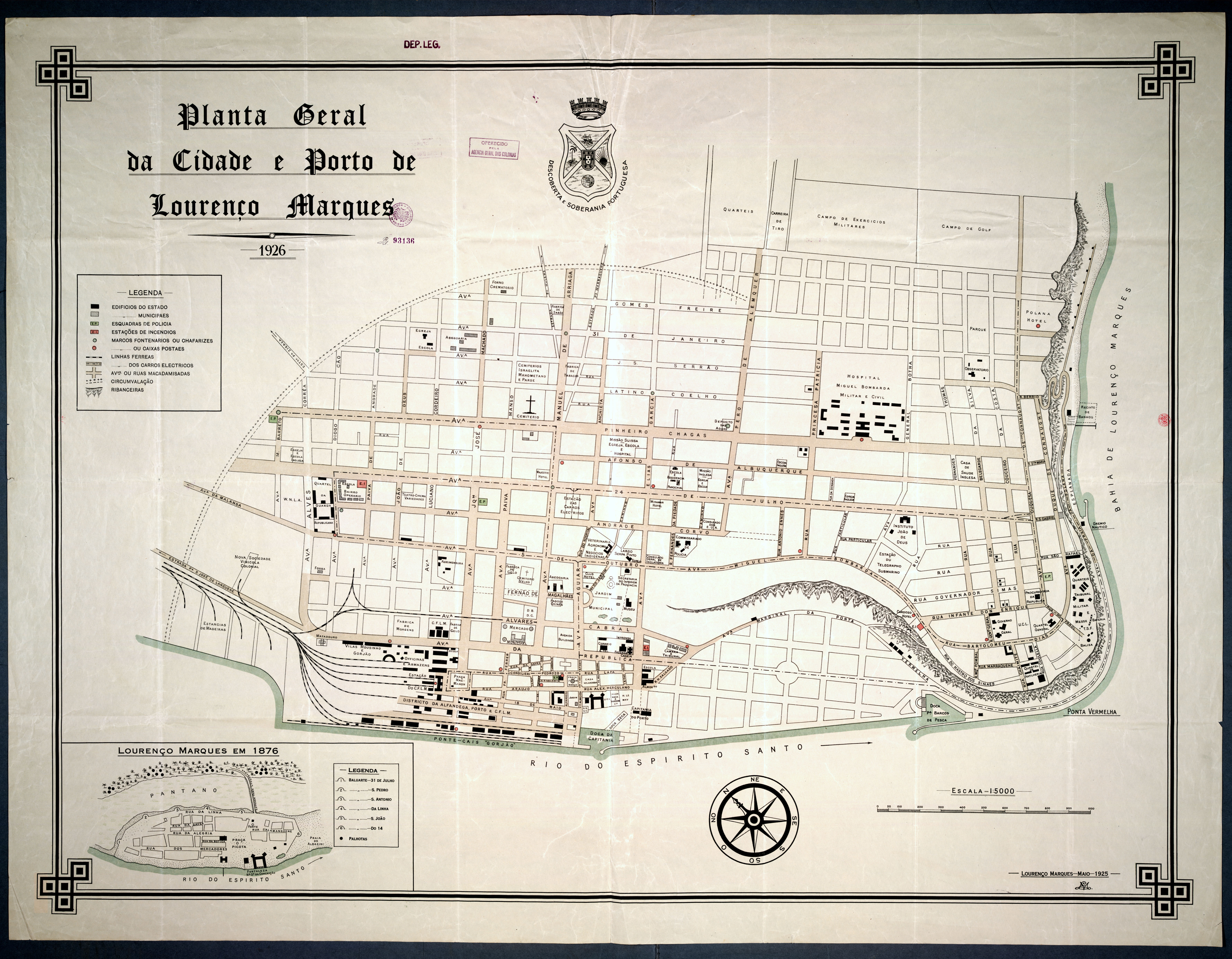
Lourenço Marques (nowadays Maputo) in 1925.

As communist and anti-colonial ideologies spread out across Africa, many clandestine political movements were established in support of Mozambique's independence. These movements claimed that policies and development plans were primarily designed by the ruling authorities for the benefit of the ethnic Portuguese population, affecting a majority of the indigenous population who suffered both state-sponsored discrimination and enormous social pressure. Many felt they had received too little opportunity or resources to upgrade their skills and improve their economic and social situation to a degree comparable to that of the Europeans. Statistically, Portuguese Mozambique's whites were indeed wealthier and more skilled than the black indigenous majority, in spite of decreasing legal discrimination of Africans starting in the 1960s.

The Front for the Liberation of Mozambique (FRELIMO), headquartered in Tanzania, initiated a guerrilla campaign against Portuguese rule in September 1964. This conflict, along with the two others already initiated in the other Portuguese overseas territories of Angola and Portuguese Guinea, became part of the Portuguese Colonial War (1961–74). Several African territories under European rule had achieved independence in recent decades. Oliveira Salazar attempted to resist this tide and maintain the integrity of the Portuguese empire. By 1970, the anti-guerrilla war in Africa was consuming an important part of the Portuguese budget and there was no sign of a final solution in sight. This year was marked by a large-scale military operation in northern Mozambique, the Gordian Knot Operation, which displaced the FRELIMO's bases and destroyed much of the guerrillas' military capacity. At a military level, a part of Portuguese Guinea was de facto independent since 1973, but the capital and the major towns were still under Portuguese control. In Angola and Mozambique, independence movements were only active in a few remote countryside areas from where the Portuguese Army had retreated. However, their impending presence and the fact that they wouldn't go away dominated public anxiety. Throughout the war period Portugal faced increasing dissent, arms embargoes and other punitive sanctions imposed by most of the international community. For the Portuguese society the war was becoming even more unpopular due to its length and financial costs, the worsening of diplomatic relations with other United Nations members, and the role it had always played as a factor of perpetuation of the Estado Novo regime. It was this escalation that would lead directly to the mutiny of members of the FAP in the Carnation Revolution in 1974 – an event that would lead to the independence of the former Portuguese colonies in Africa. A leftist military coup in Lisbon on 24 April 1974 by the Movimento das Forças Armadas (MFA), overthrew the Estado Novo regime headed by Prime Minister Marcelo Caetano.

As one of the objectives of the MFA, all the Portuguese overseas territories in Africa were offered independence. FRELIMO took complete control of the Mozambican territory after a transition period, as agreed in the Lusaka Accord which recognized Mozambique's right to independence and the terms of the transfer of power.

Within a year of the Portuguese military coup at Lisbon, almost all of the Portuguese population had left the African territory as refugees (in mainland Portugal they were known as retornados) – some expelled by the new ruling power of Mozambique, some fleeing in fear. A parade and a state banquet completed the independence festivities in the capital, which was expected to be renamed Can Phumo, or "Place of Phumo", after a Tsonga chief who lived in the area before the Portuguese navigator Lourenço Marques founded the city in 1545 and gave his name to it. Most city streets, named for Portuguese heroes or important dates in Portuguese history, had their names changed.

== Famous people ==
- Al Bowlly (singer)
- Alexandre Quintanilha (science)
- António de Almeida Santos (politics and law)
- António José Enes (politics)
- Armando Guebuza (politics and business)
- Artur Ivens Ferraz (military and politics)
- Carlos Cardoso (journalism)
- Eduardo Mondlane (politics)
- Francisco Barreto (exploration)
- Graça Machel (politics)
- Guilherme de Melo (journalism and literature)
- Gungunhana (military and politics)
- Henrique Mitchell de Paiva Cabral Couceiro (military and politics)
- João Carqueijeiro (visual arts)
- João de Deus Pinheiro (university teaching, engineering, politics)
- João Maria Tudela (music)
- Joaquim Augusto Mouzinho de Albuquerque (military and politics)
- Joaquim Chissano (politics)
- José Craveirinha (poetry)
- José Rodrigues dos Santos (journalism and literature)
- Lourenço Marques (exploration and navigation)
- Luis de Matos (magic)
- Malangatana (painting and poetry)
- Marcelino dos Santos (poetry and politics)
- Mário Crespo (journalism)
- Mário Simões Dias (music)
- Mariza (music)
- Mia Couto (literature)
- Noémia de Sousa (poetry)
- Orlando da Costa (literature)
- Otelo Saraiva de Carvalho (military and politics)
- Pancho Guedes (architecture)
- Paulo Furtado (music)
- Ricardo Rangel (photojournalism)
- Samora Machel (politics)
- Sancho de Tovar (exploration and navigation)
- Soshangane (military and politics)
- Tasha de Vasconcelos, (actress and model)
- Teresa Heinz (philanthropy)
- Yasuke (samurai)
- Zeca Afonso (music)

=== Association football ===
- Alberto da Costa Pereira (association football)
- Carlos Queiroz (association football)
- Carlos Xavier (association football)
- Daúto Faquirá (association football)
- Eusébio da Silva Ferreira (association football)
- Jorge Cadete (association football)
- Matateu (association football)
- Mário Coluna (association football)
- Mário Wilson (association football)
- Pedro Xavier (association football)
- Shéu (association football)

== Gallery ==
=== Society ===
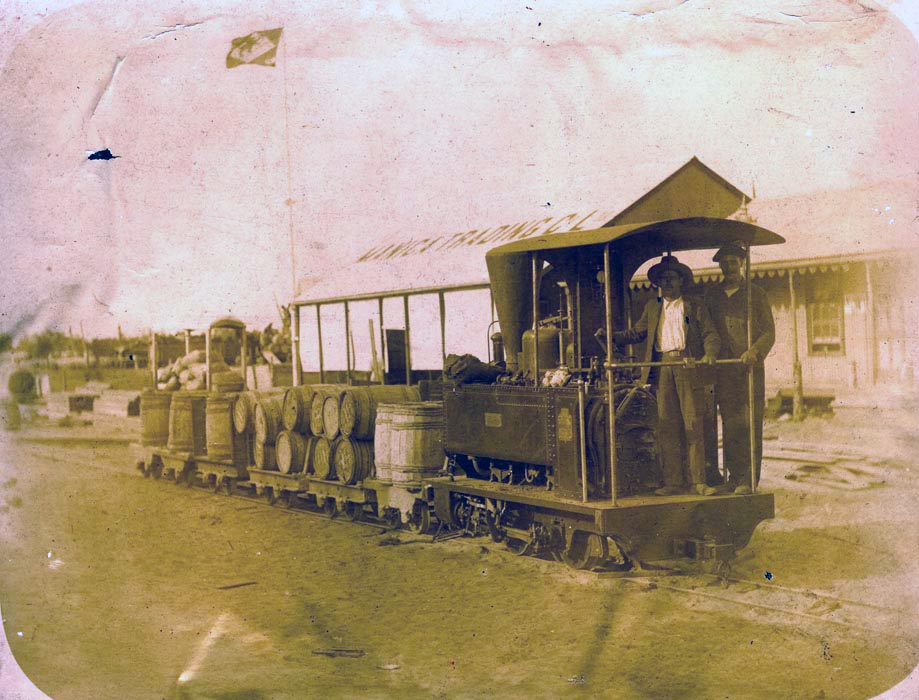
Narrow-gauge rail in Beira. 1897.

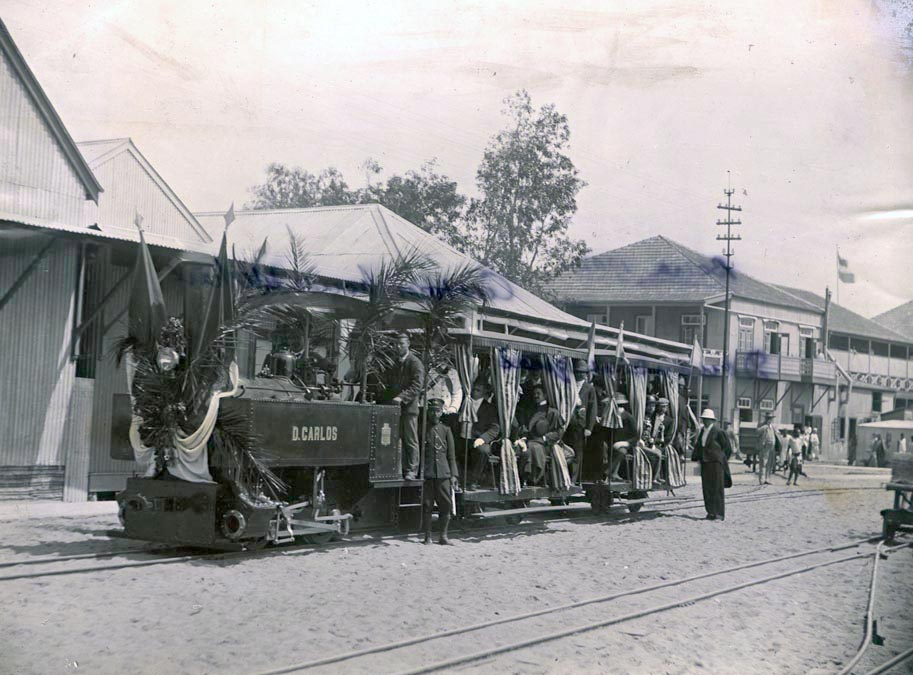
Inauguration of the "tramuei" (Tramway). Beira, 1901.

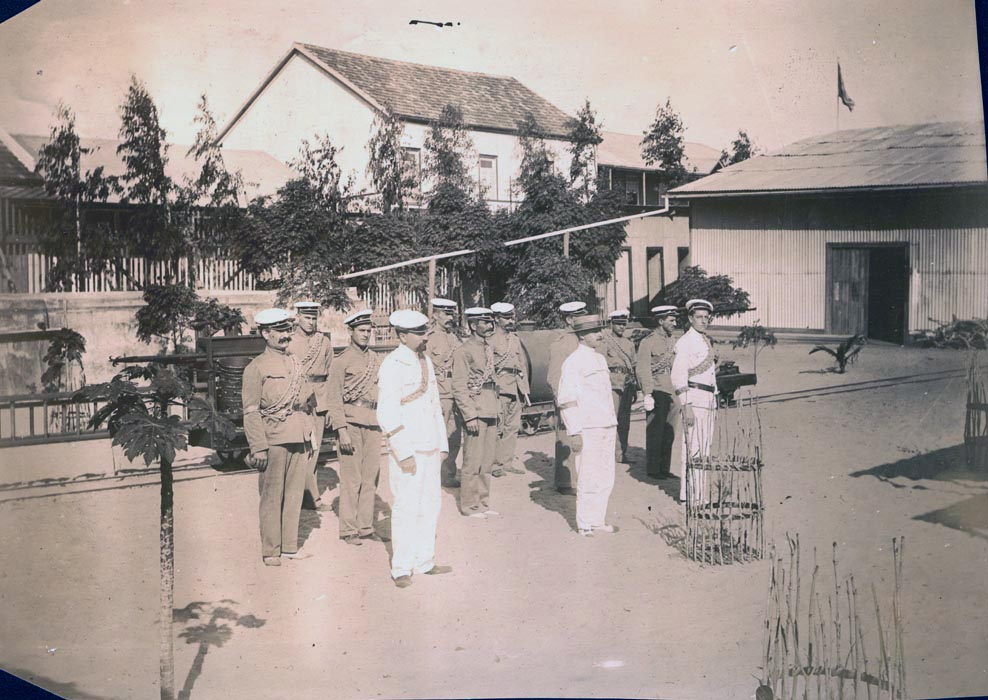
Volunteer firemen, 1903.

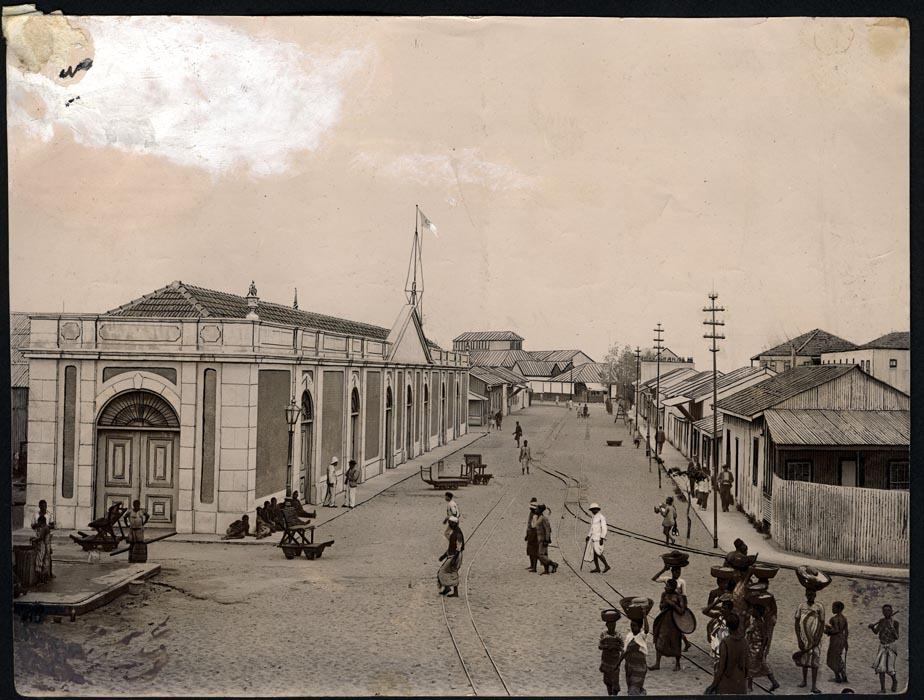
Beira, 1901.

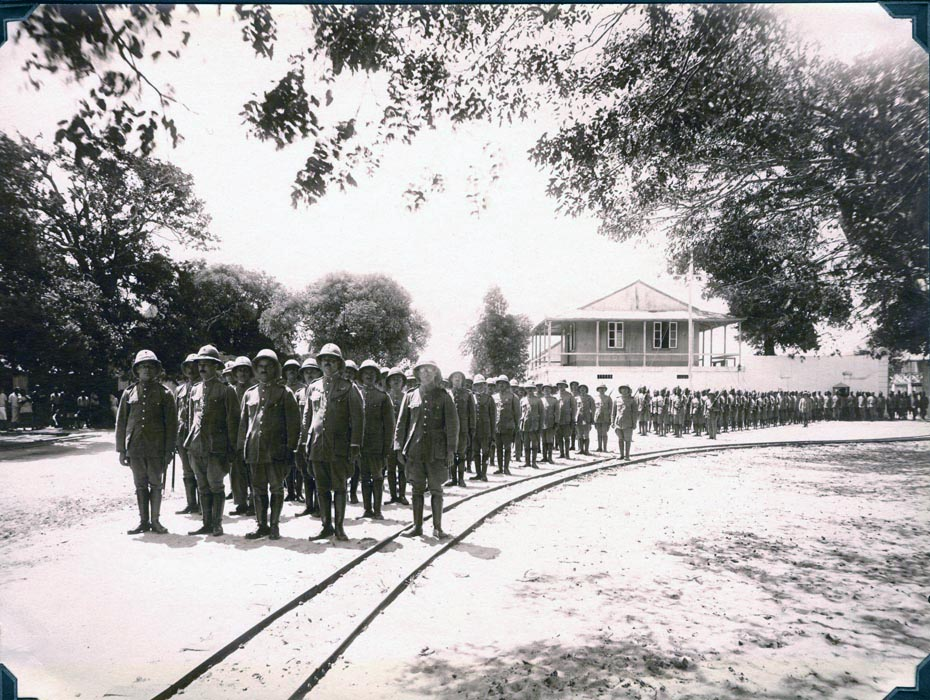
Portuguese police force in 1925.

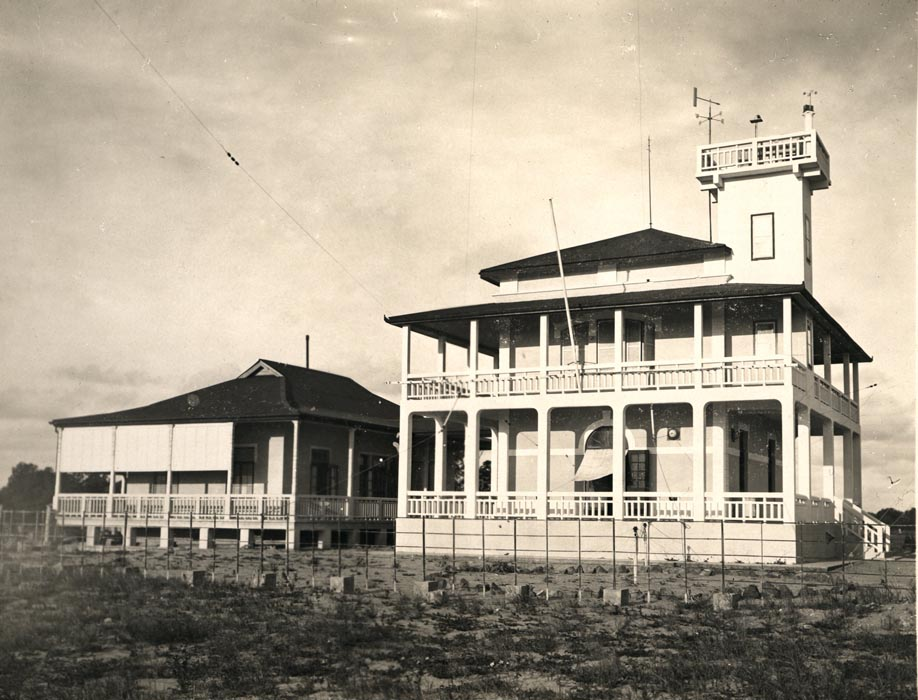
Observatory. 1930.

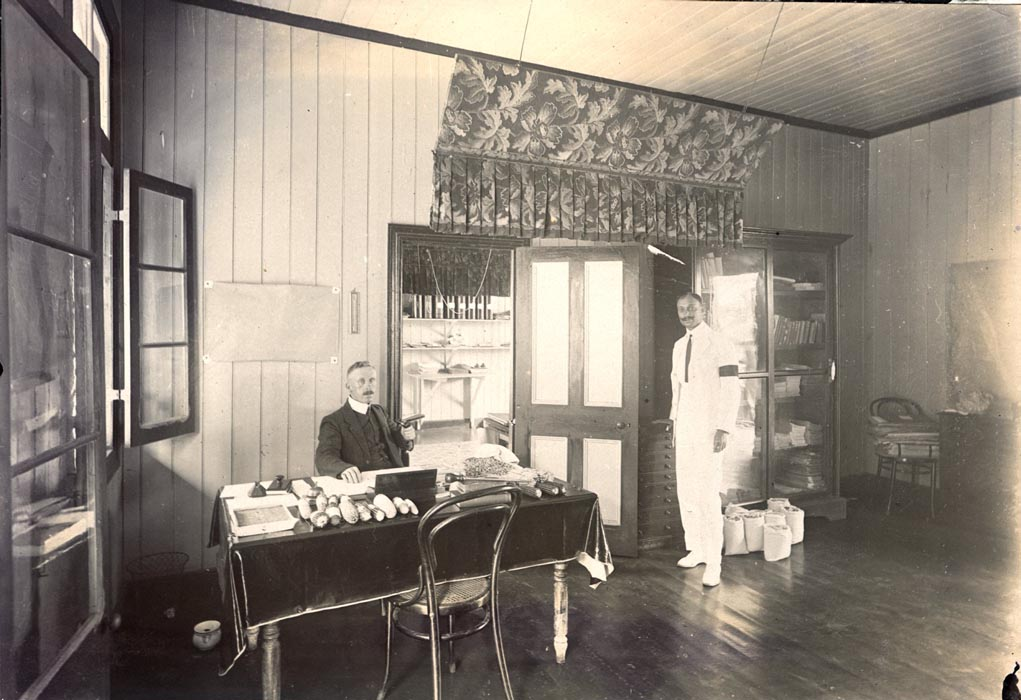
Agronomist office.

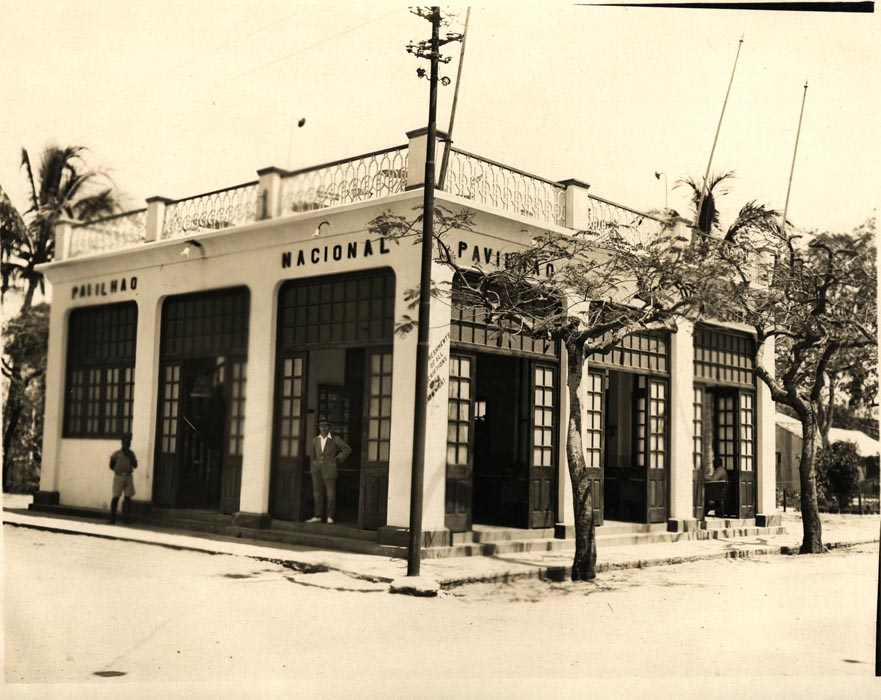
Brewery. Beira, 1930.

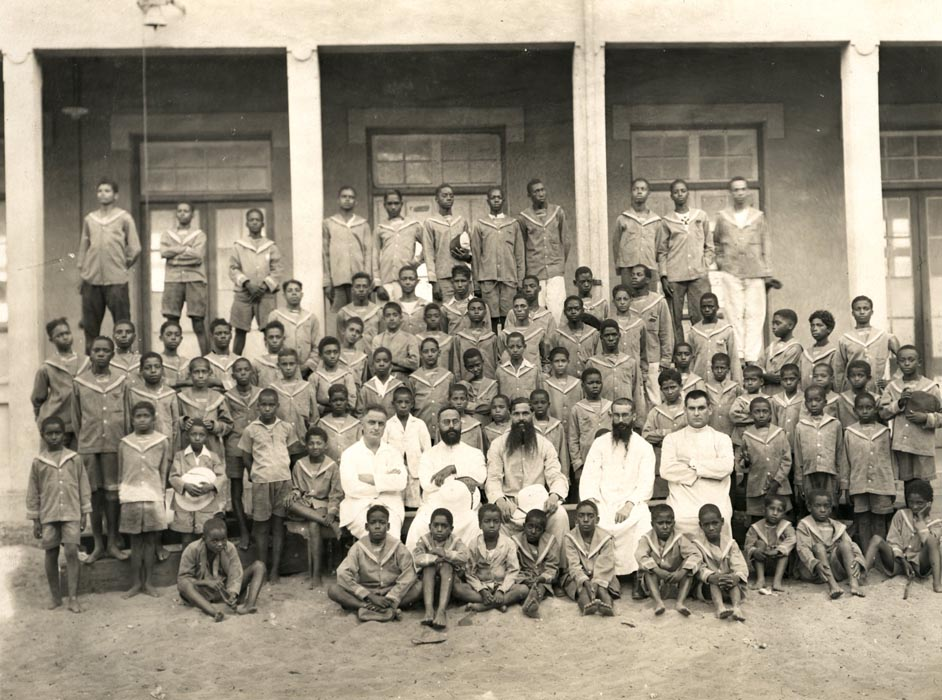
Teachers and students of the "School of Arts and Trades".

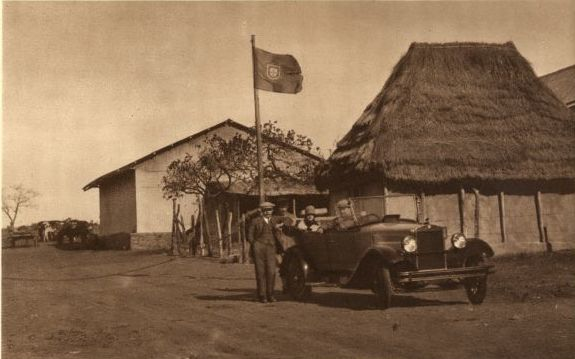
Border post between Portuguese Mozambique and British-Swaziland, 1929.

=== Colonial architecture ===
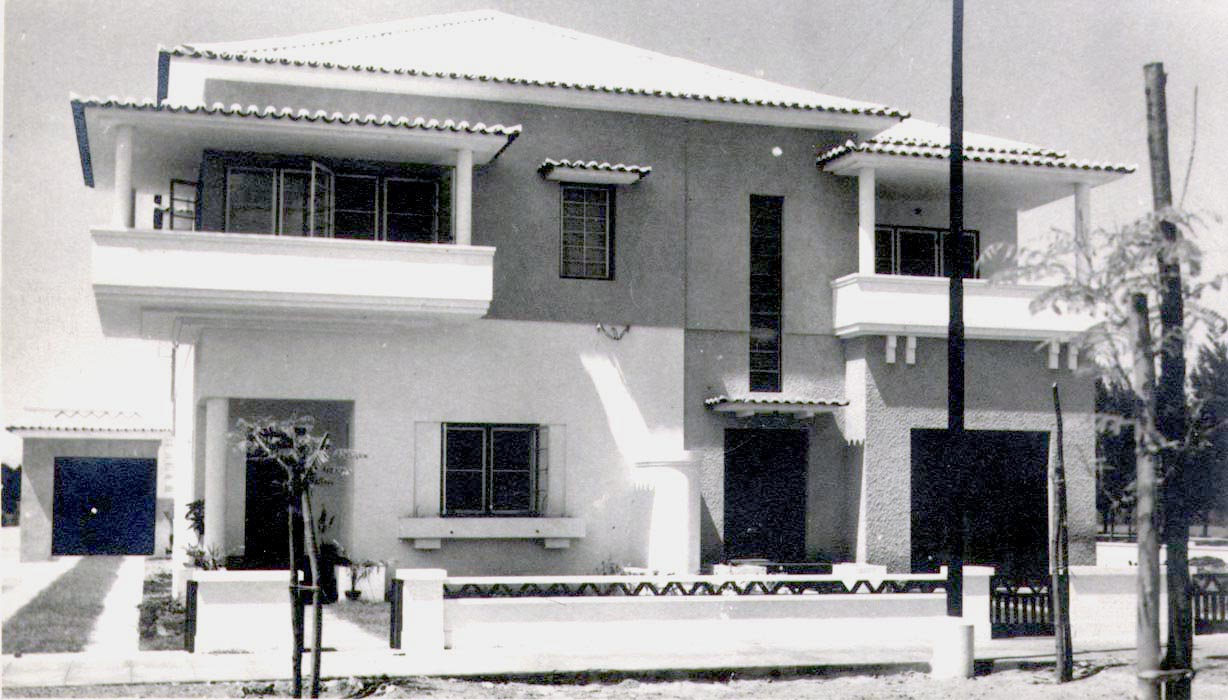
Beachfront double estate. Beira, 1939.

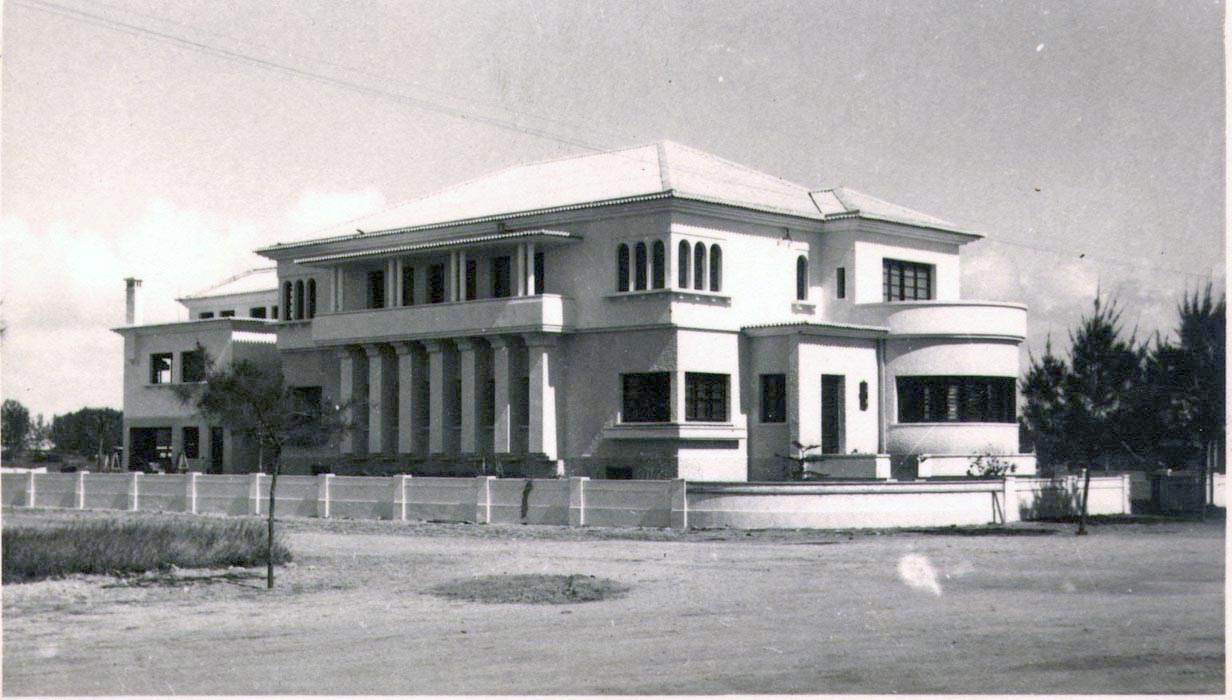
Large beachfront estate in Beira.

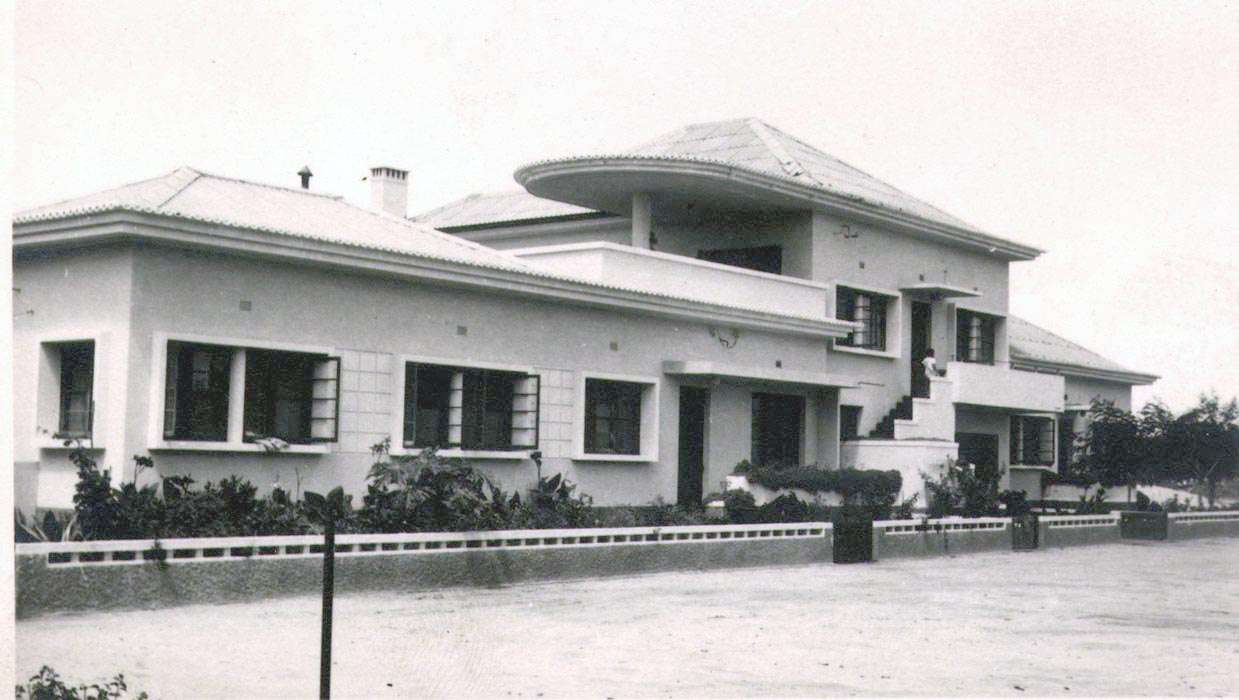
Beachfront estate in Beira, 1939.

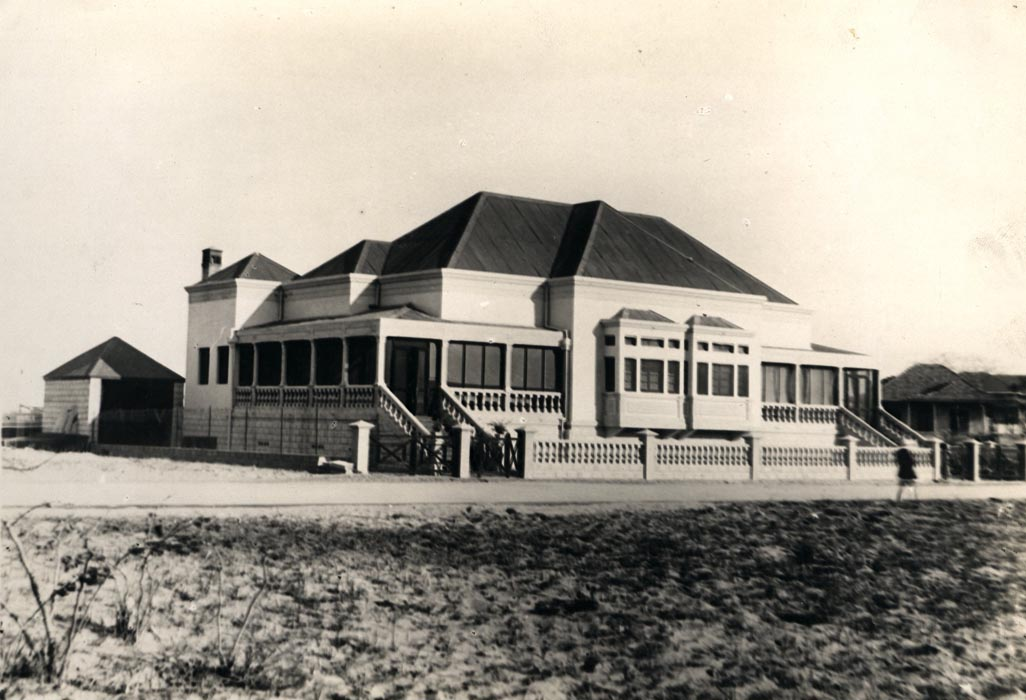
Private residence in Beira. 1930.

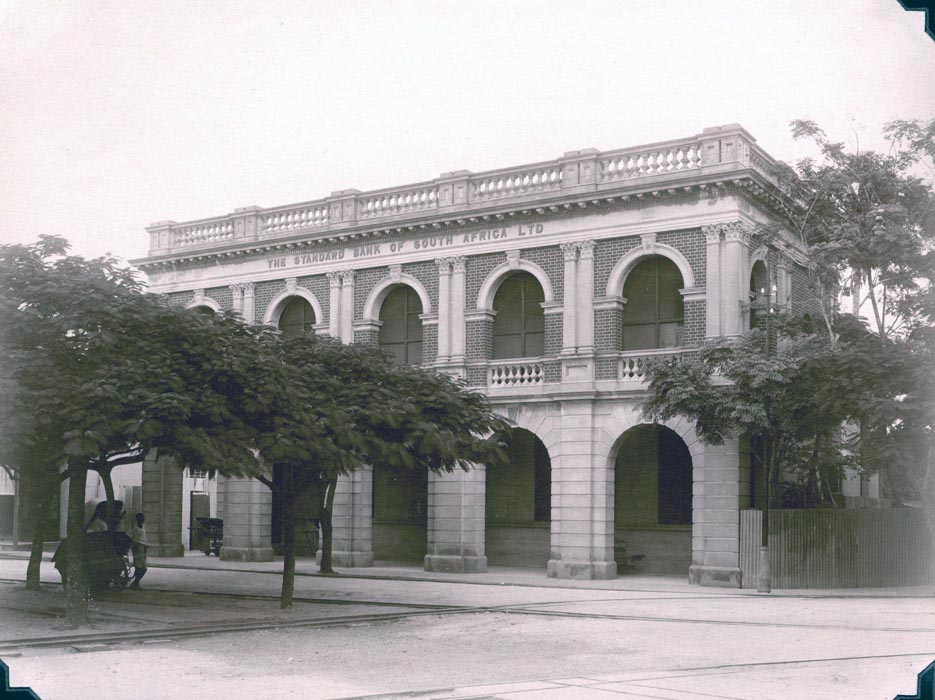
Standard Bank building, Beira. 1925.

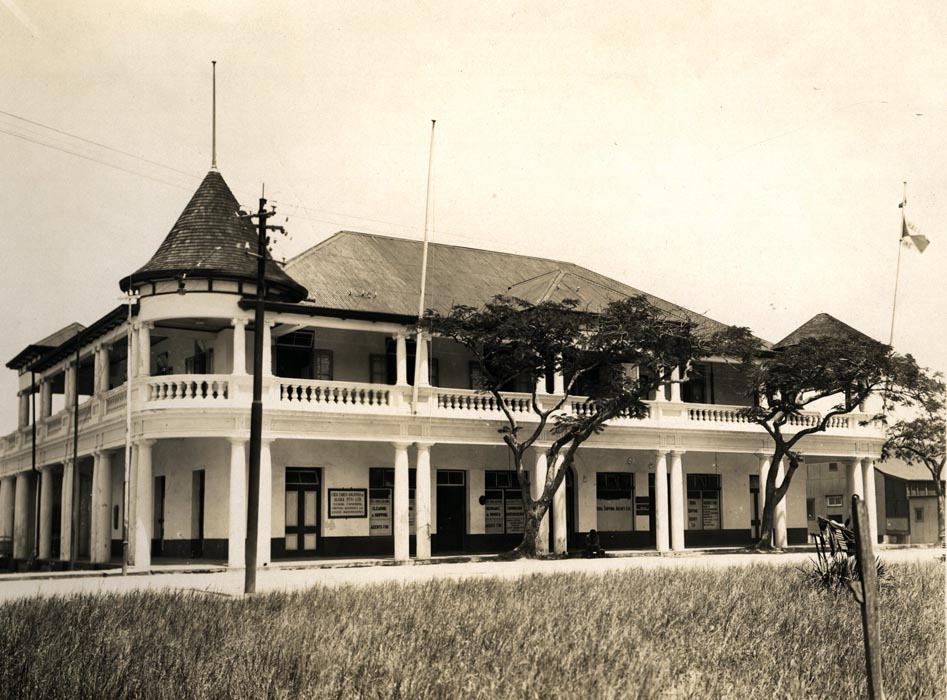
Beira Clube. Beira, 1930.

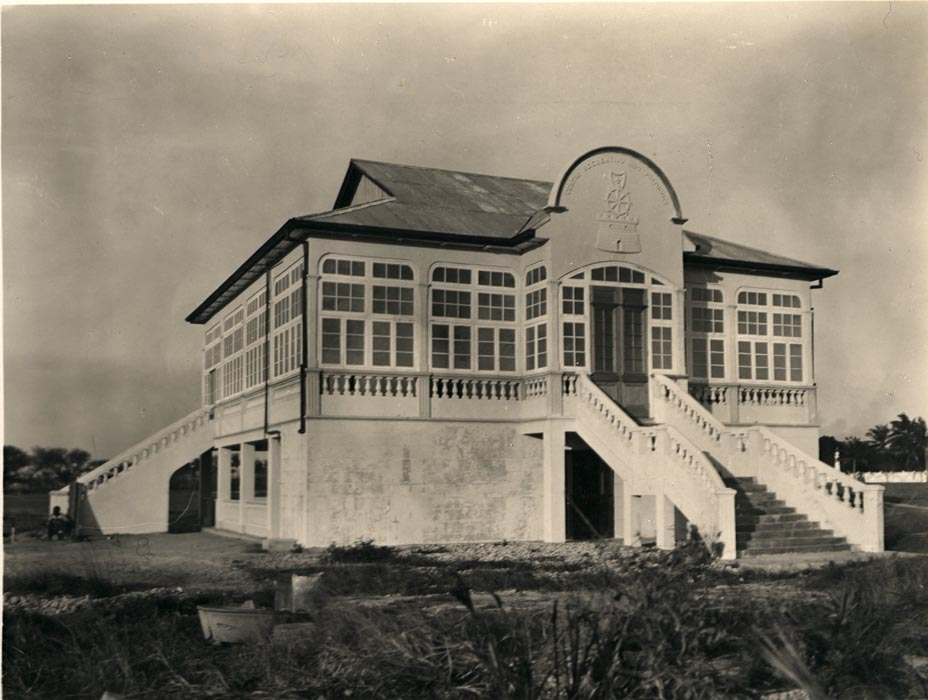
"Indo-Portuguese recreational center". Beira.

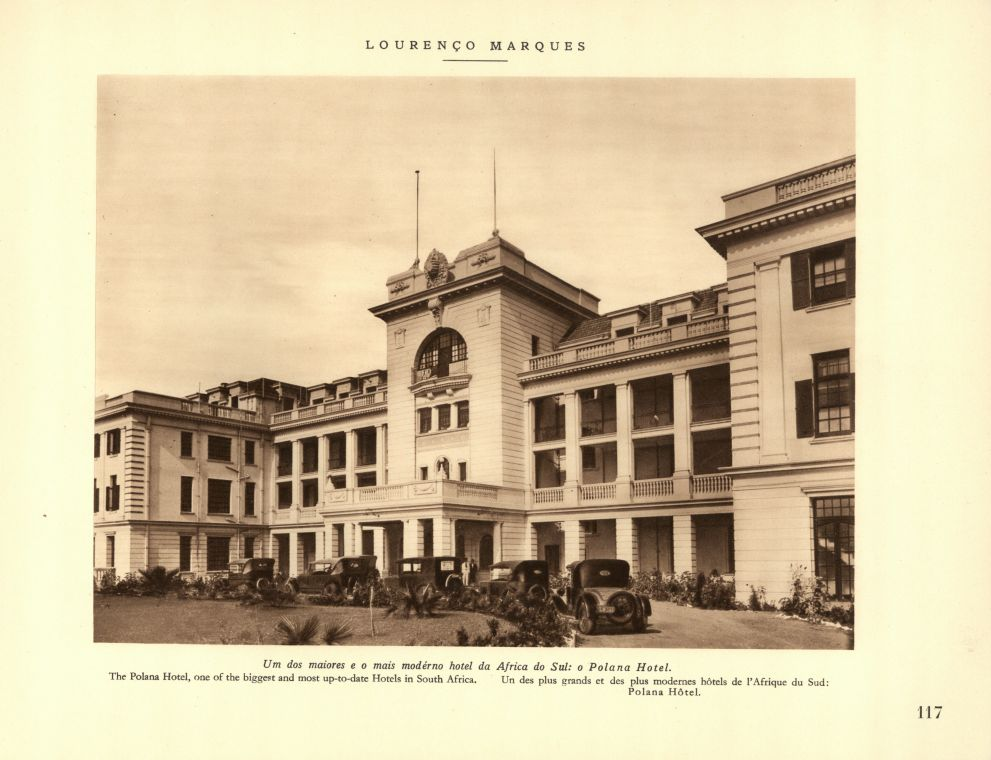
Hotel Polana 1929, once one of the largest and most luxurious in southern Africa.

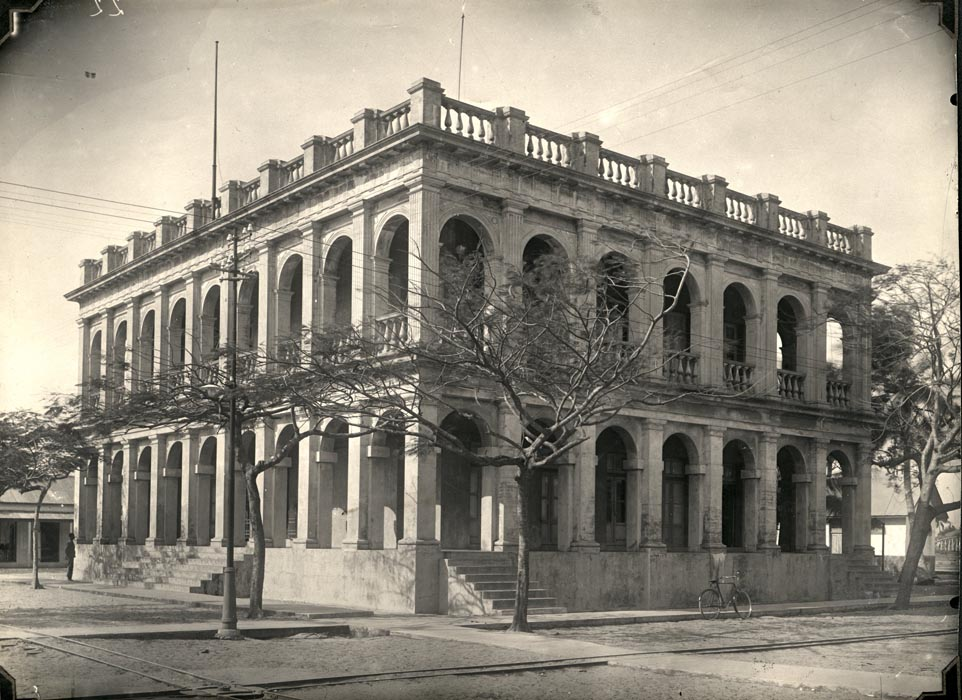
Courtroom. Beira, 1925.

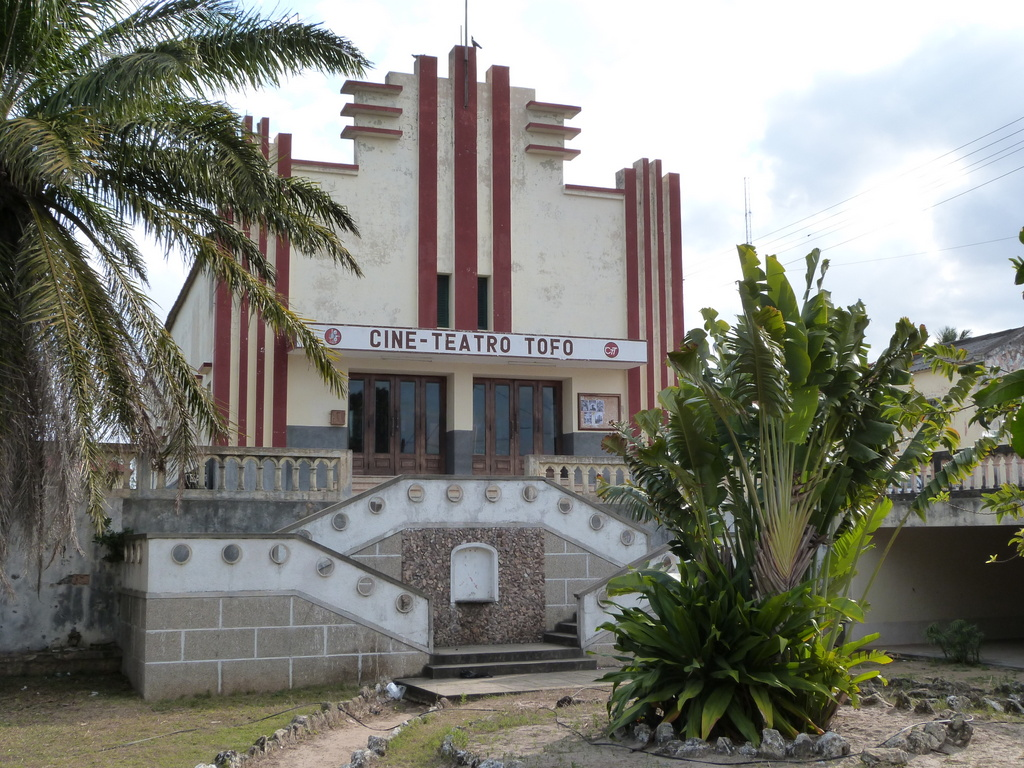
Cine-Theater. Inhambane.

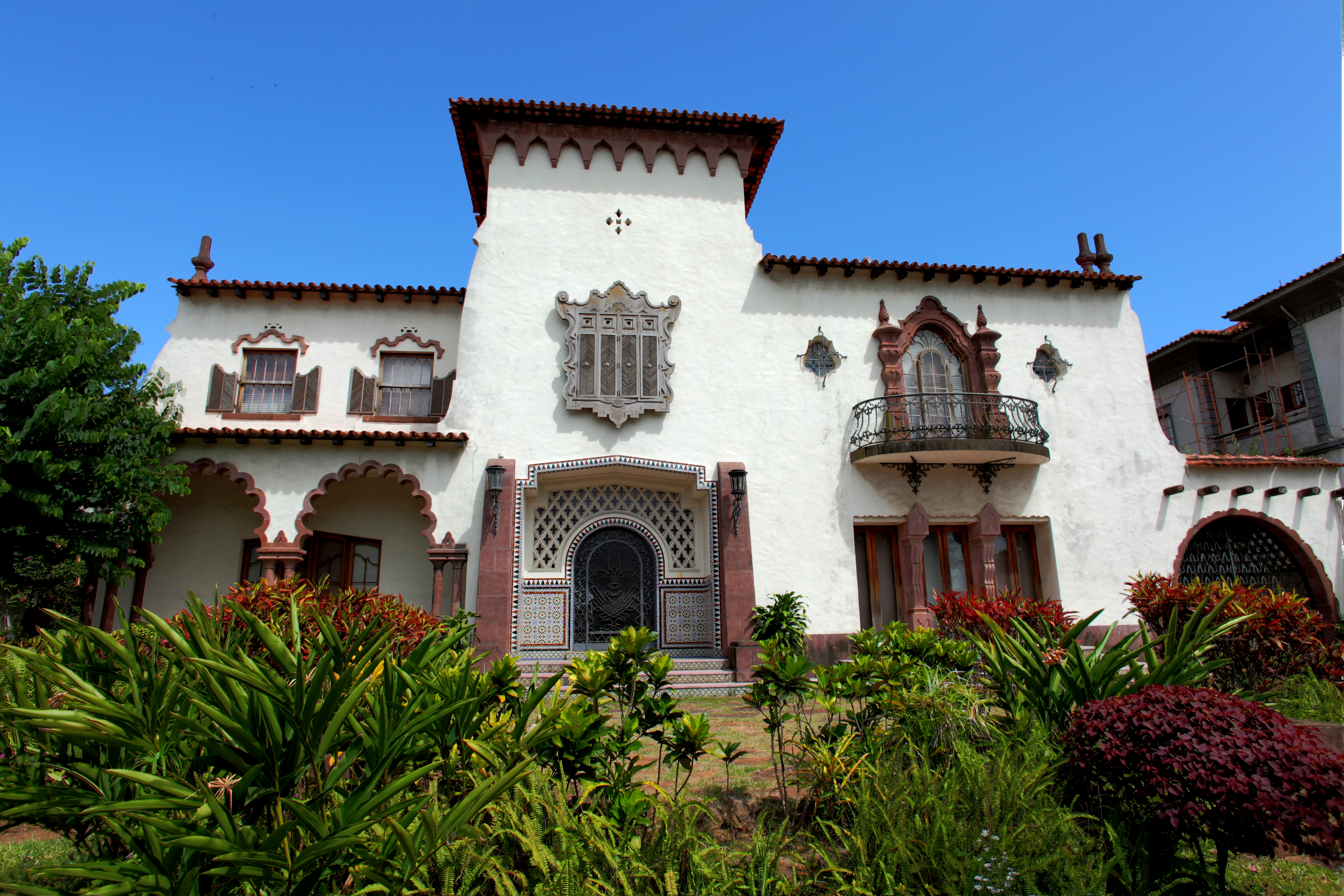
Colonial residence, Maputo.

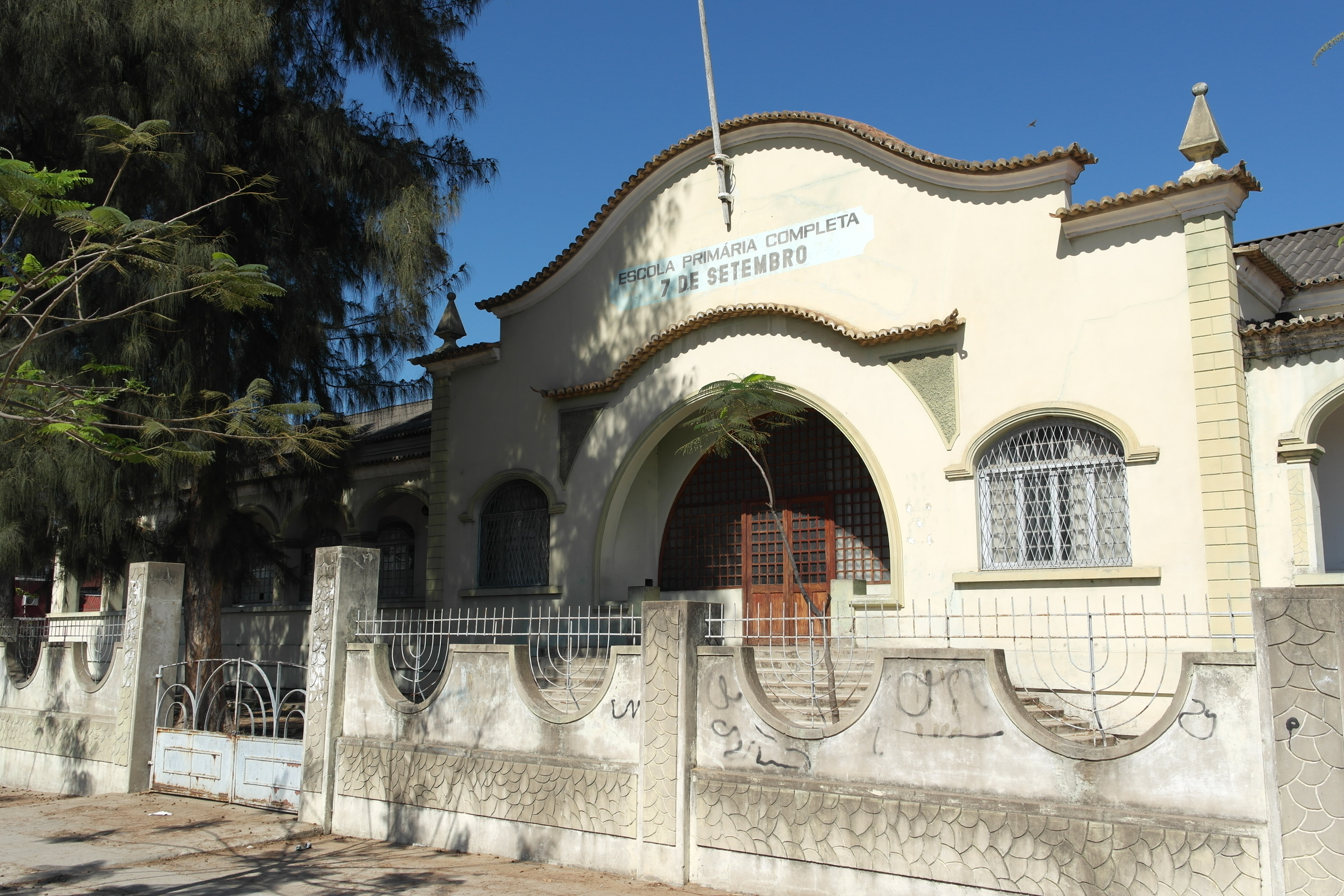
Primary school, Maputo.

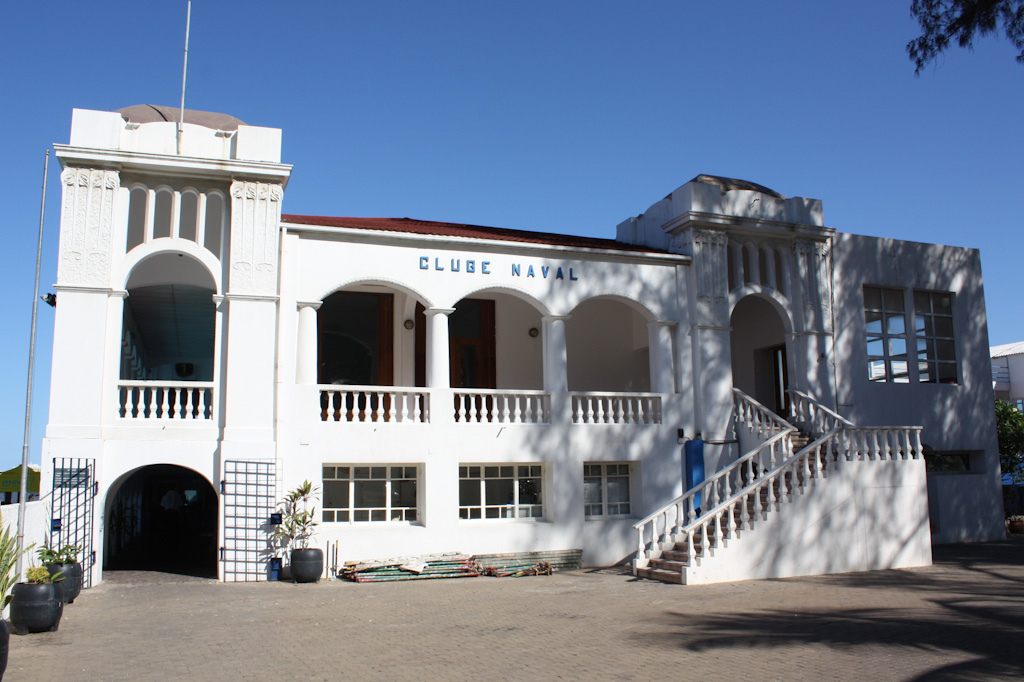
Maputo Naval Club

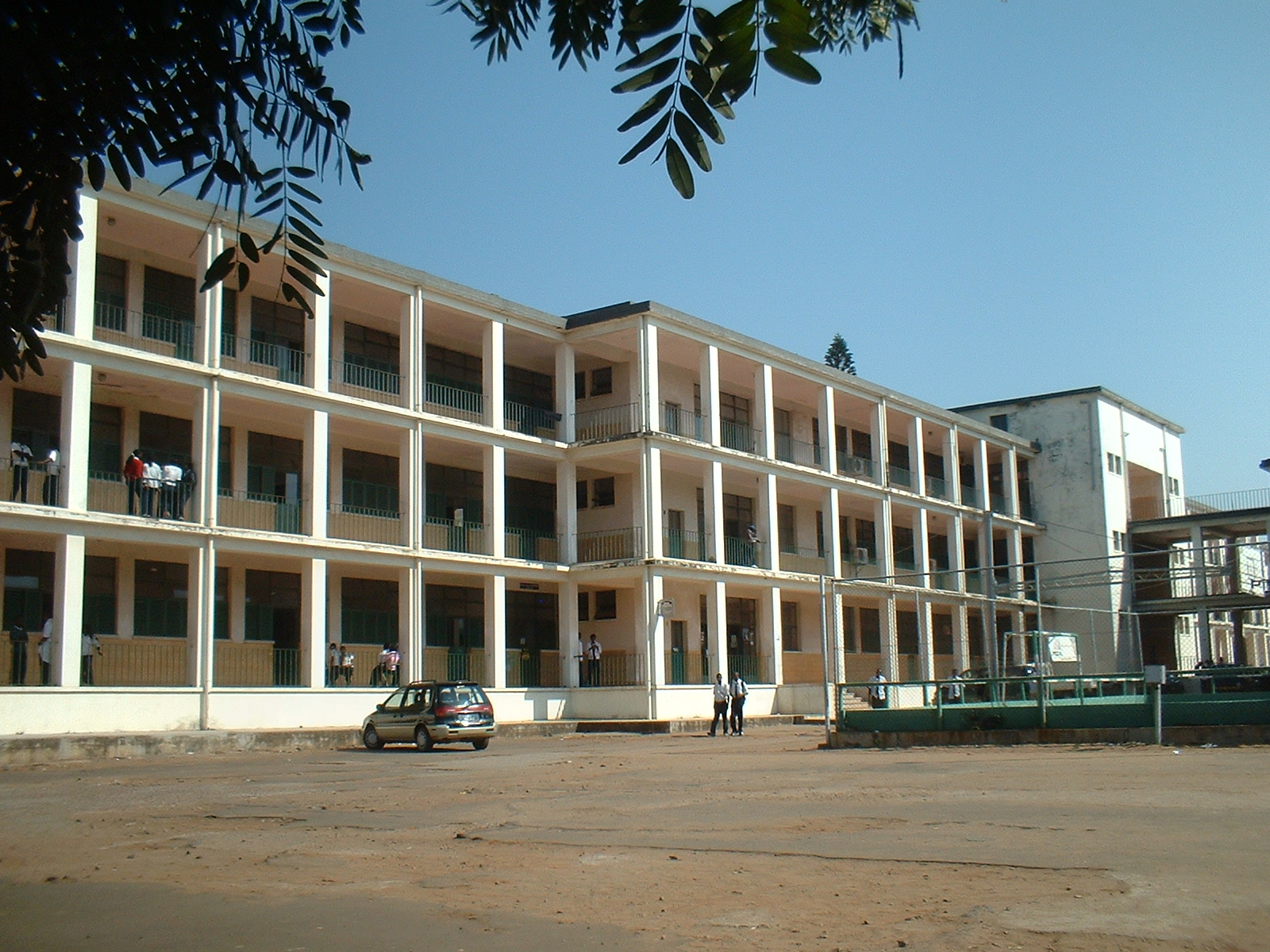
Maputo High School

=== Postage ===
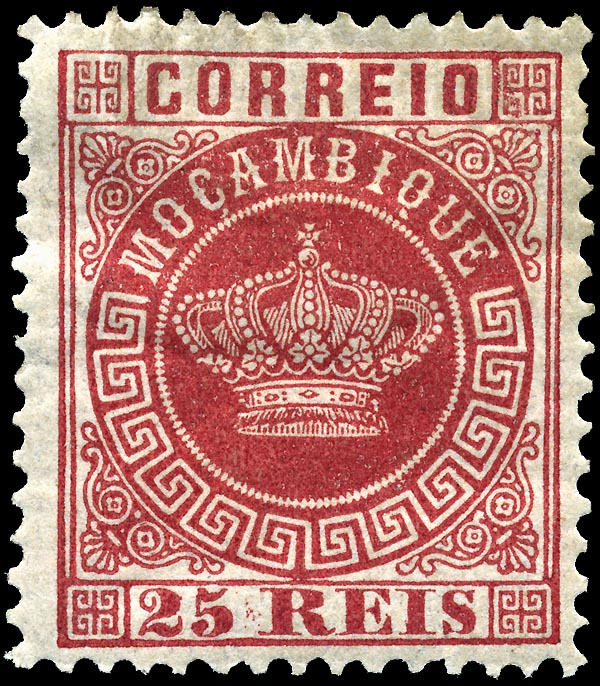
25 reis 1877

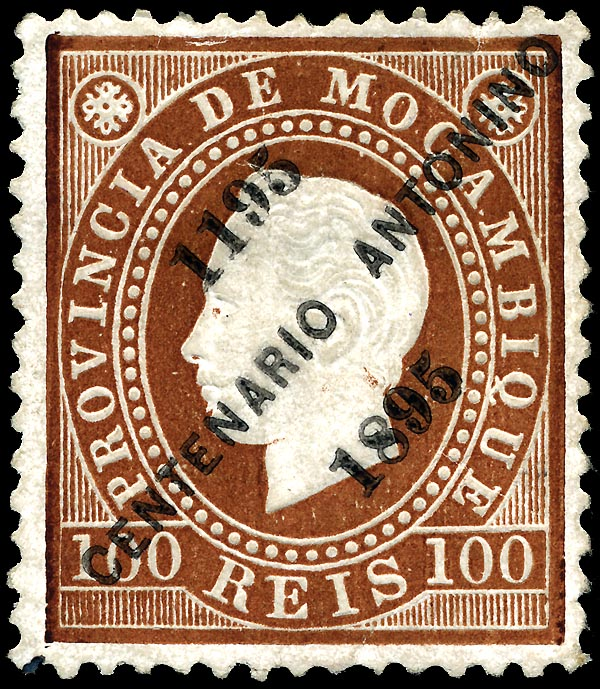
100 reis 1895

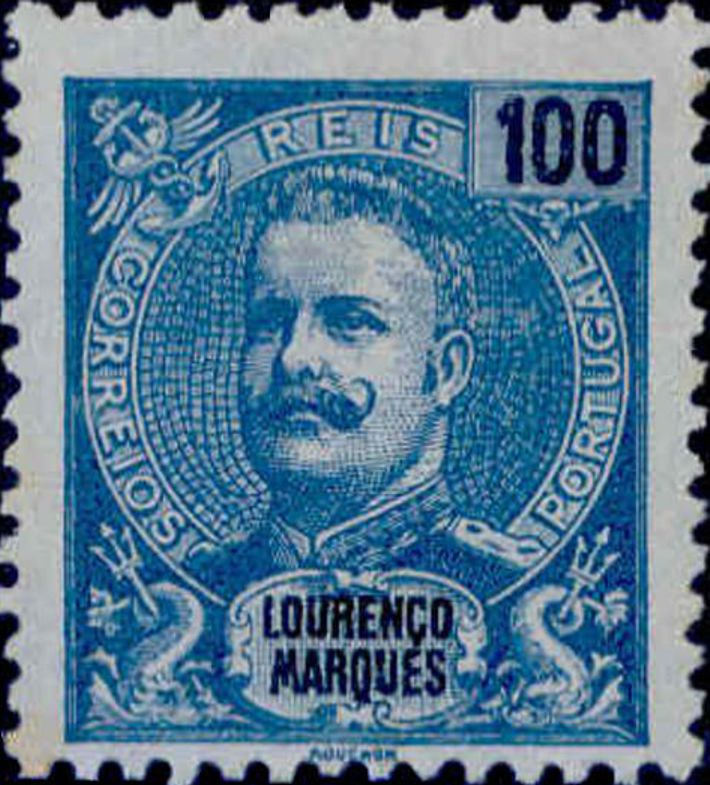
100 reis 1898.

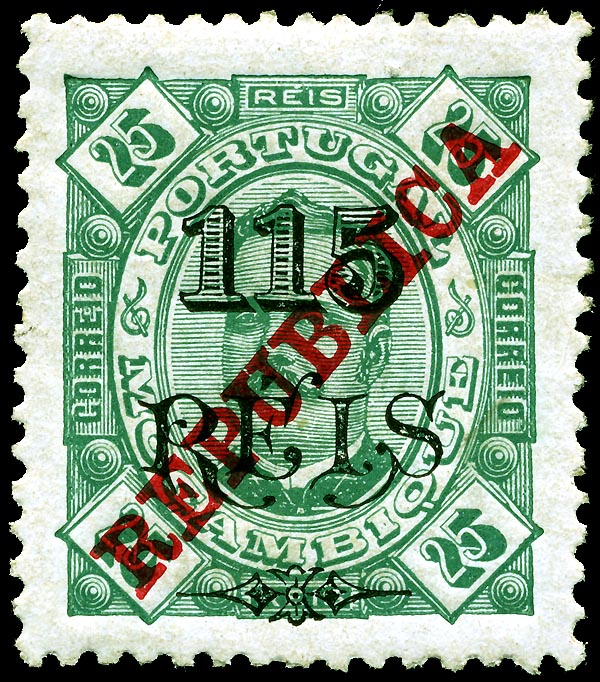
115 reis 1915

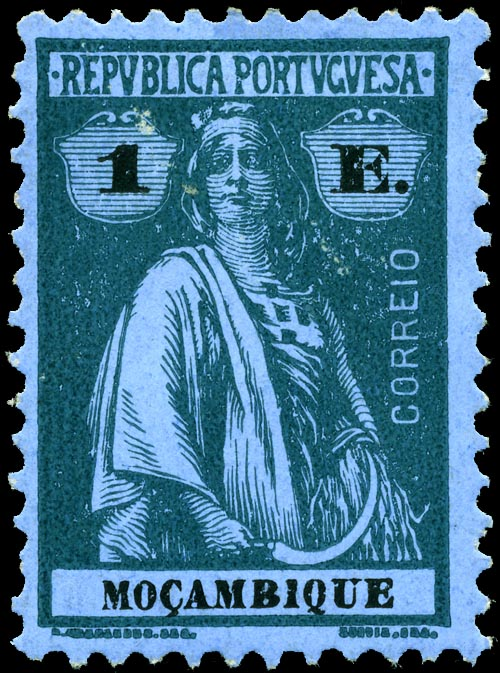
1 escudo 1921

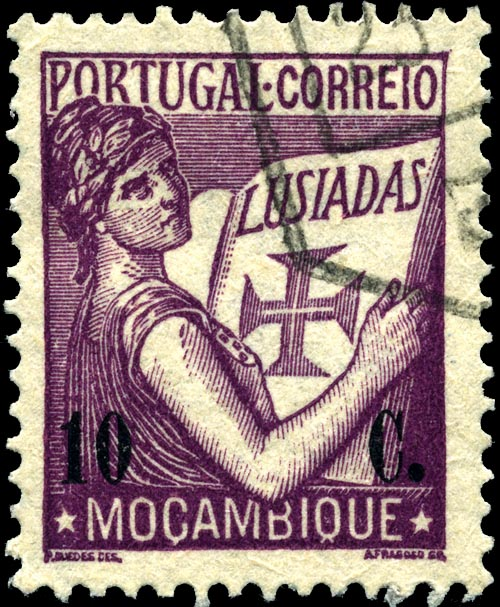
10 centavos 1933

=== Military ===
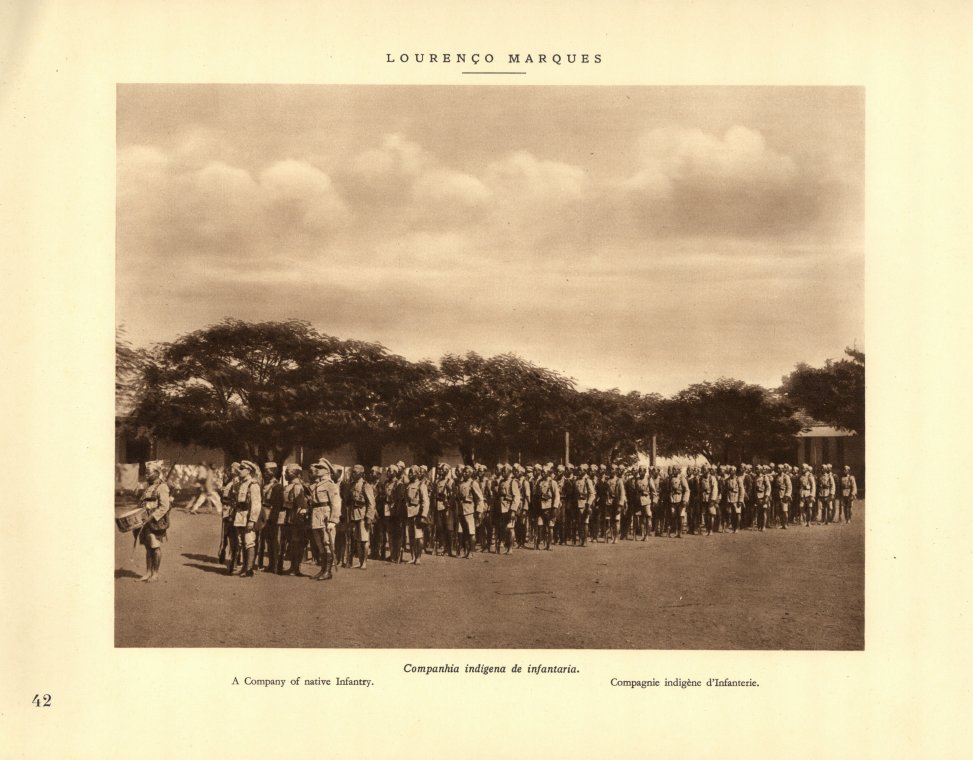
Native infantry company

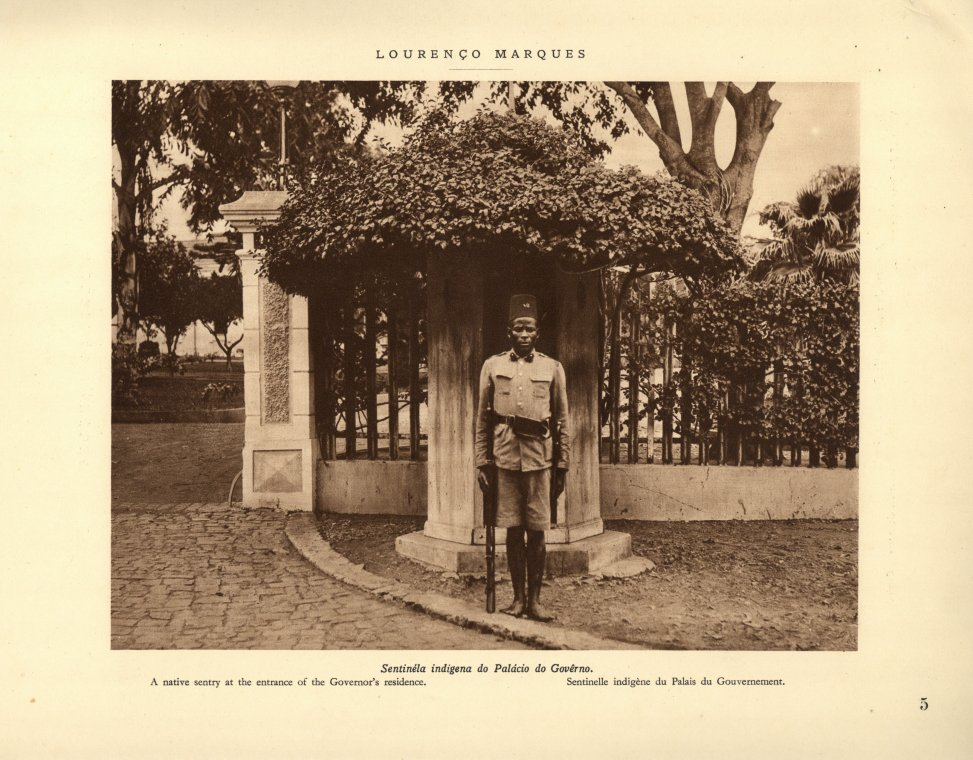
Native sentry at the governors residence

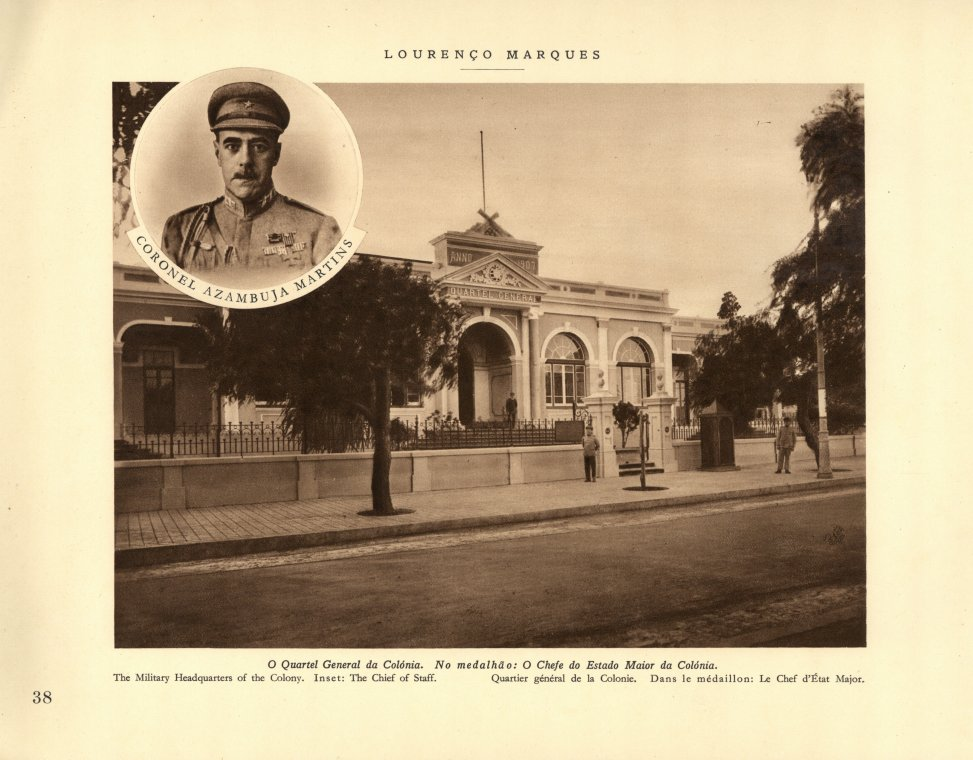
The military headquarters of Portuguese Mozambique and chief of staff Azambuja Martins.

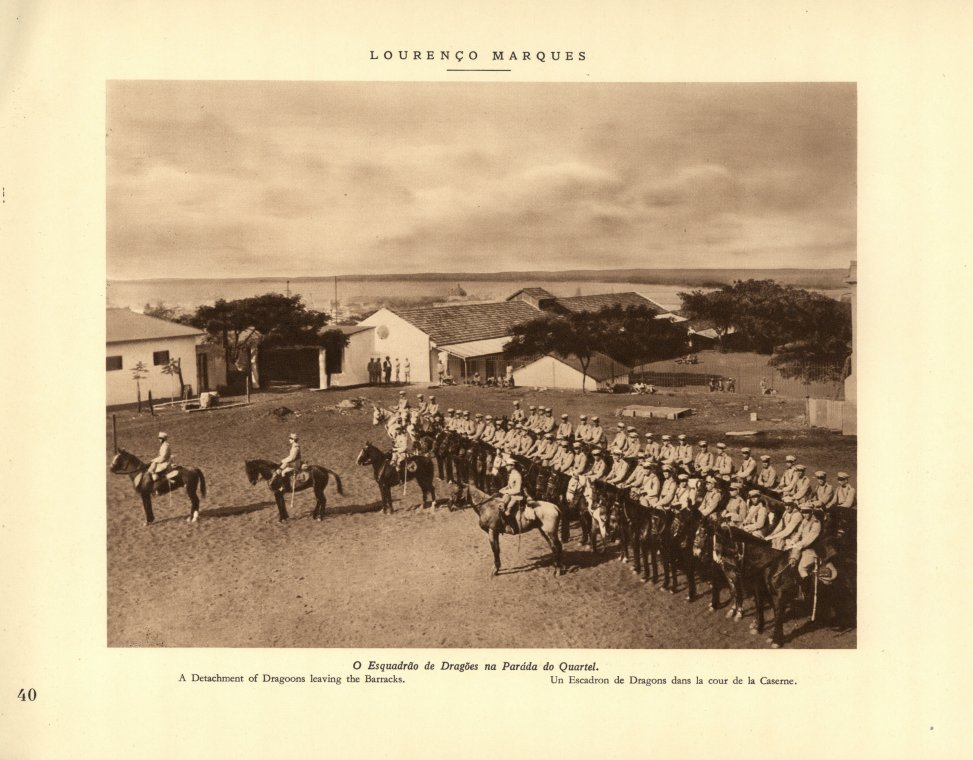
A detachment of dragoons

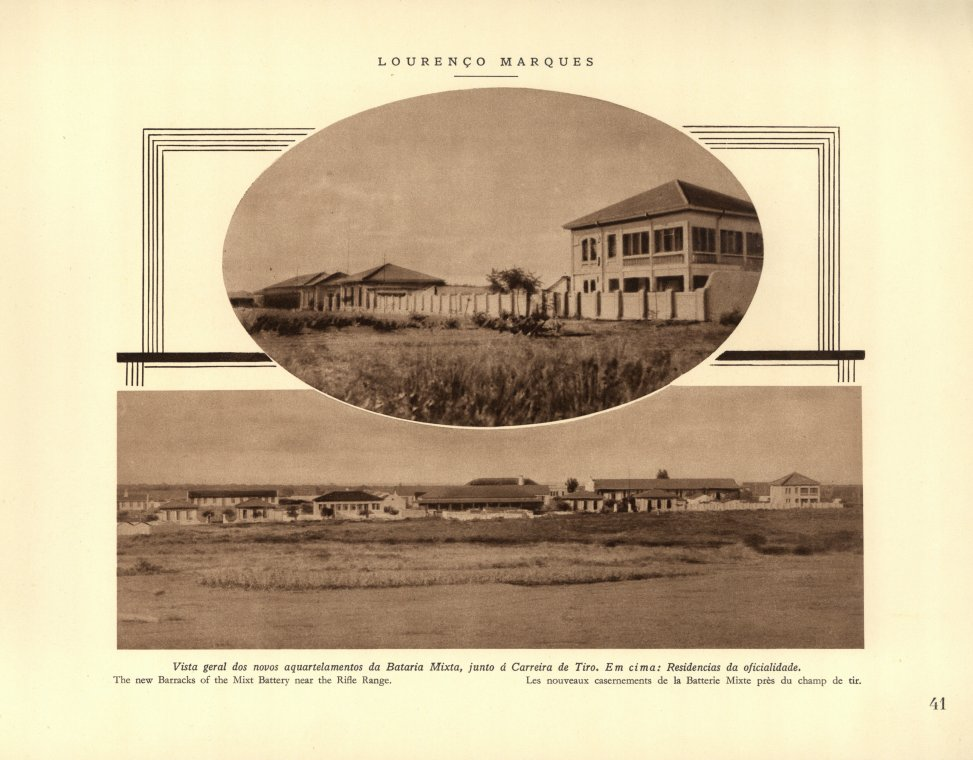
Mixed artillery battery barracks in Lourenço Marques.

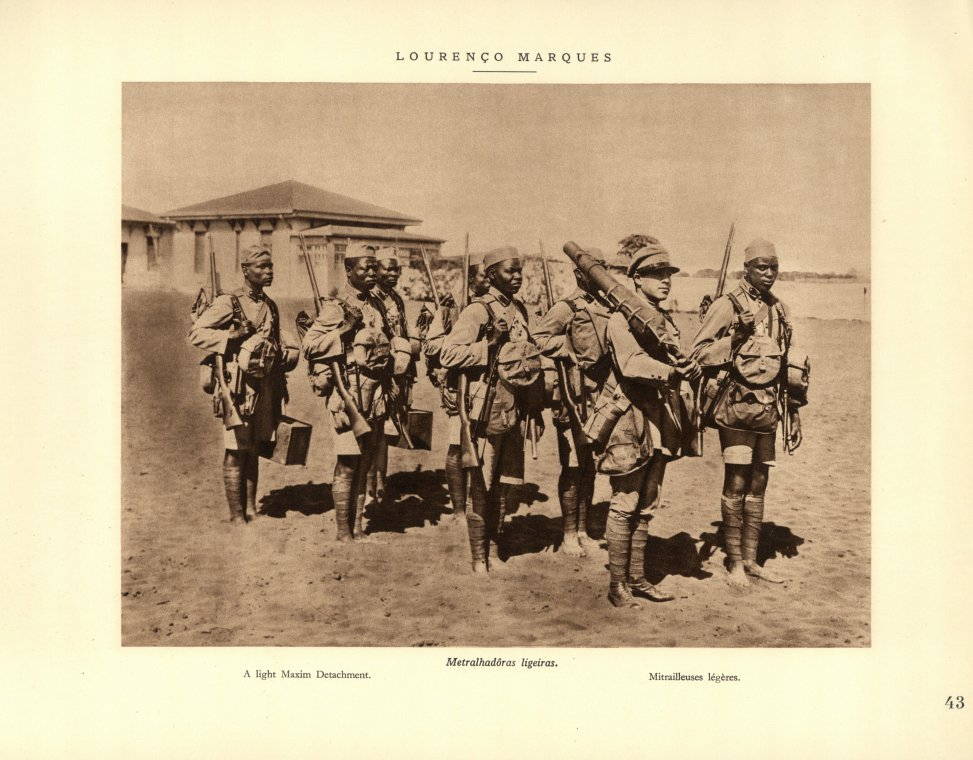
Light machinegun detachment.

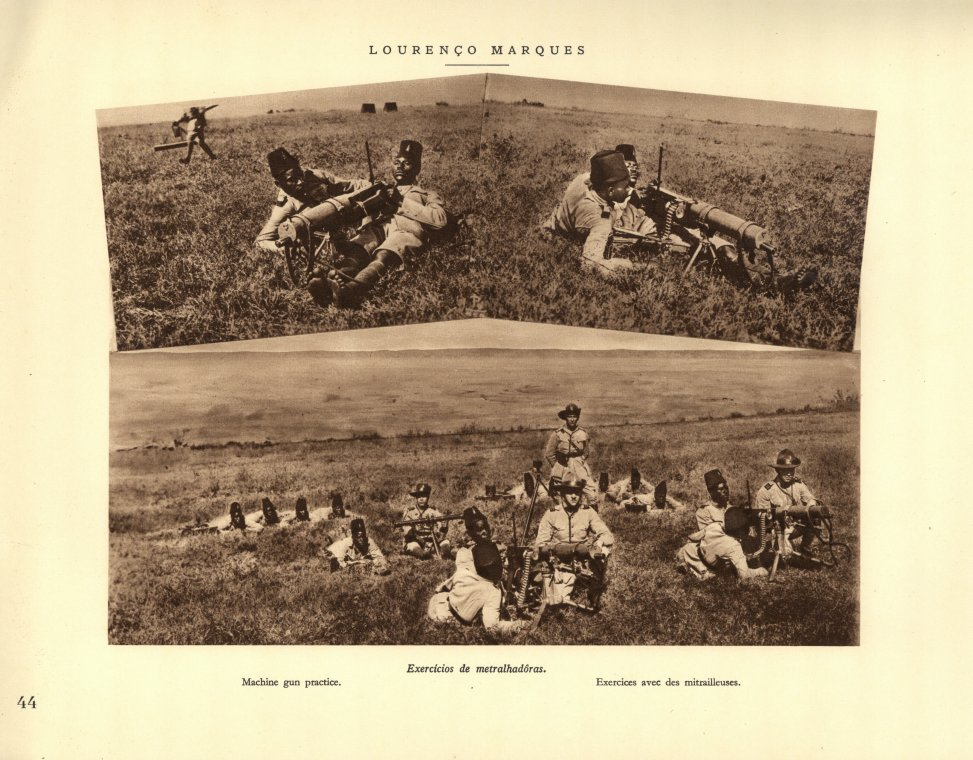
Machinegun practice

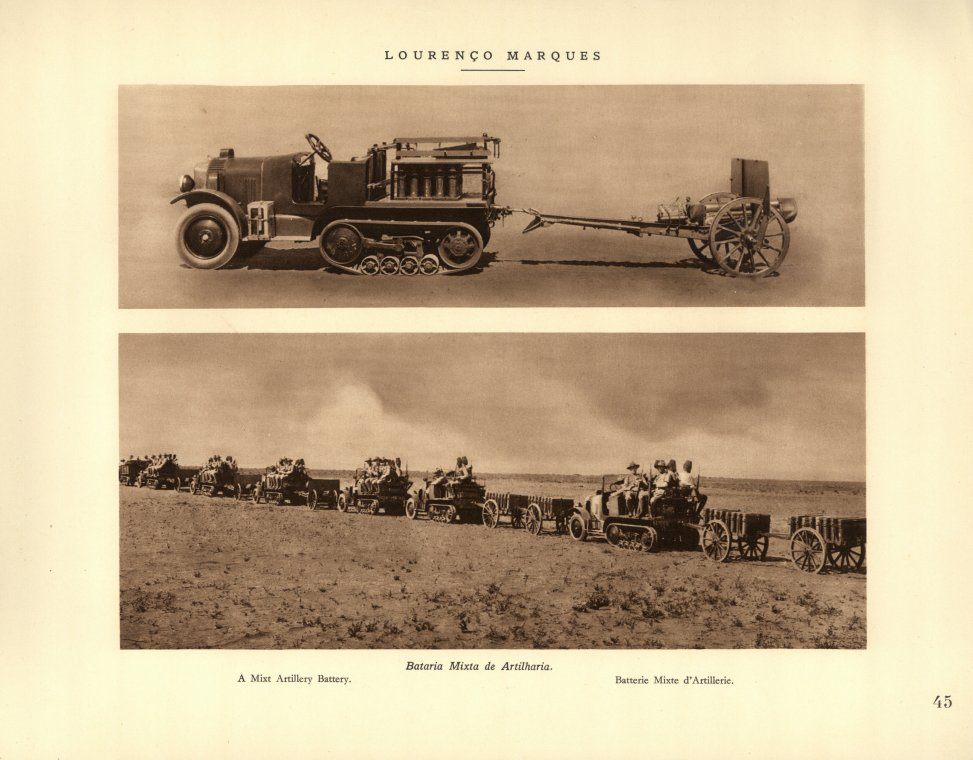
Mixed artillery battery kegresses.

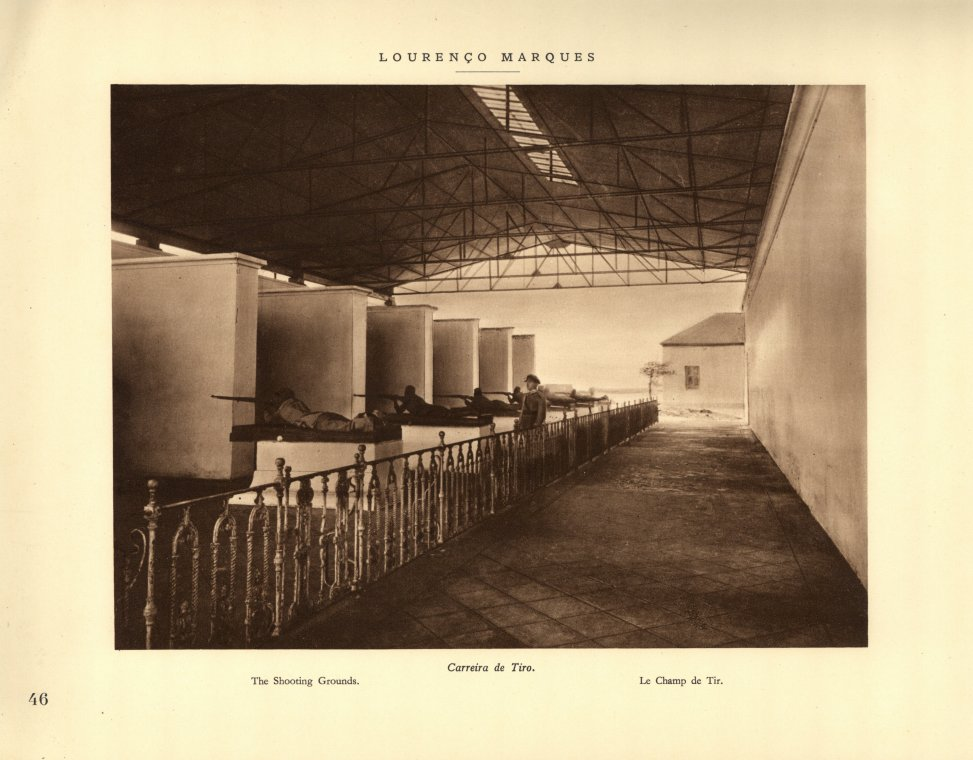
Shooting range at Lourenço Marques.

== See also ==
Proposed flag for Portuguese Mozambique (1932)

Proposed flag for Portuguese Mozambique (1965)

- Arquivo Histórico Ultramarino (archives in Lisbon documenting Portuguese Empire, including Mozambique)
- Estado Novo (Portugal)
- History of Mozambique
- List of colonial governors of Mozambique
- Portuguese Angola
- Portuguese Cape Verde
- Portuguese Guinea
- Portuguese São Tomé and Príncipe
- Campaigns of Pacification and Occupation
- Pink Map 19th century attempt to connect Angola and Mozambique

== Bibliography ==
- Gerardo Augusto Pery, ed. (1875). "Mocambique". Geographia e estatistica geral de Portugal e colonias (in Portuguese). Lisbon: Imprensa Nacional.
- "Portuguese East Africa" in the Catholic Encyclopedia (1913)
- Cana, Frank Richardson (1911). "Portuguese East Africa" . Encyclopædia Britannica. Vol. 22 (11th ed.). pp. 163–168.
- Herrick, Allison and others (1969). "Area Handbook for Mozambique", US Government Printing Office.
