= People's Republic of Mozambique =

1975–1990 Mozambican self-described socialist state in southeast Africa

People's Republic of Mozambique República Popular de Moçambique
- 1975–1990
- Flag; Top (1975–1983); Bottom (1983–1990) Emblem; Top (1975–1982); Bottom (1982–1990)
- Motto: Unidade, Trabalho, Vigilância ("Unity, Work, Vigilance")
- Anthem: Viva, Viva a FRELIMO (English: "Long Live, Long Live FRELIMO") (1975–2002) (Note: "Pátria Amada" ('Beloved Homeland') is the national anthem of Mozambique, approved by law in 2002 under Article 295 of the Constitution of Mozambique. It was written by Salomão J. Manhiça and replaced "Viva, Viva a FRELIMO" on 30 April 2002. In 1992, the song's lyrics were removed, with the political changes that then took place. The parliament then held a contest to choose a lyrics. The result is the current anthem, Pátria Amada.)
- Capital and largest city: Maputo
- Official languages: Portuguese
- Religion: State atheism (de facto); Roman Catholicism, Islam
- Demonym: Mozambican
- Government: Unitary socialist republic
- President
  - 1975–1986: Samora Machel
  - 1986: Political Bureau
  - 1986–1990: Joaquim Chissano
- Prime Minister
  - 1986–1990: Mário da Graça
- Legislature: People's Assembly
- Historical era: Cold War
  - Lusaka Accord: 7 September 1974
  - Independence: 25 June 1975
  - Mozambican Civil War begins: 30 May 1977
  - Constitutional reform: 30 November 1990

Area
  - Total: 801,590 km^{2} (309,500 sq mi)
  - Water (%): 2.2
- HDI (1990): 0.227 low
- Currency: Escudo (MZE) (1975–1980); Metical (MZM) (1980–1990)
- Calling code: +258
- ISO 3166 code: MZ
| Preceded by | Succeeded by |
| Portuguese Mozambique | Republic of Mozambique |

The People's Republic of Mozambique (Portuguese: República Popular de Moçambique) was the Mozambican socialist state that existed in present-day Mozambique from 1975 to 1990. It was established when the country gained independence from Portugal in June 1975 and the Mozambican Liberation Front ("FRELIMO") established a socialist state led by President Samora Machel. The state enjoyed close political and military ties with the Soviet Union, which was one of the first nations to provide diplomatic recognition and financial support to the fledgling FRELIMO government. For the duration of its history, the People's Republic of Mozambique remained heavily dependent on Soviet aid, both in financial terms as well as with regard to food security, fuel, and other vital economic necessities. From 1977 to 1992, the country was devastated by a deadly civil war which pitted the armed forces against the anti-communist Mozambique National Resistance (RENAMO) insurgency, backed by neighbouring Rhodesia and South Africa.

The People's Republic of Mozambique enjoyed close relations with the People's Republic of Angola, Cuba, and the German Democratic Republic (East Germany), all of which were socialist states at the time. The People's Republic of Mozambique was also an observer of the COMECON ("Council for Mutual Economic Assistance"), an economic organization of socialist and communist states. Mozambique made a bid to formally join COMECON as a member state in the early 1980s but was rebuffed, despite East German sponsorship and endorsements. Following the decline of Soviet and COMECON economic influence in the 1980s, the People's Republic of Mozambique sought rapprochement with the United States, the International Monetary Fund and West Germany after the death of Samora Machel and the beginning of economic reforms under Joaquim Chissano.

Geographically the People's Republic of Mozambique is exactly the same as the present-day Republic of Mozambique, located on the southeast coast of Africa. It bordered Swaziland to the south, South Africa to the southwest, Rhodesia (later Zimbabwe) to the west, Zambia and Malawi to the northwest, and Tanzania to the north.

== History ==
=== Background ===
Portugal fought a long and bitter counter-insurgency campaign in Mozambique from 1964 to 1974 against the Frente de Libertação de Moçambique (FRELIMO), an anti-colonial African nationalist movement which initially operated out of external sanctuaries in neighbouring Tanzania. FRELIMO had begun forming a guerrilla army to resist Portuguese rule by early 1963, with most of the insurgents being trained in Algeria and provided with arms by both the Soviet Union and the People's Republic of China. The Soviet Union supplied FRELIMO with small arms, fuel, food, logistical vehicles, and financial contributions ranging from $85,000 to $100,000 annually, while the Chinese government supplied FRELIMO with over 10,000 tonnes of weaponry in 1971 alone. FRELIMO also soon gained a monopoly on support and recognition from the Organisation of African Unity (OAU), which plied it with financial assistance as well as arms funnelled through the sympathetic Tanzanian government. In response to the FRELIMO insurgency, the Portuguese resorted to a villagisation campaign modelled after the Strategic Hamlet Program implemented by the United States in the Vietnam War, sealing thousands of Mozambican civilians in fortified settlements in an attempt to isolate the insurgents from their popular bases of support. It also launched general offensives to close FRELIMO's infiltration routes into Tanzania and recruited more indigenous counter-insurgency units. Despite these measures, the Portuguese had lost control of vast segments of the country by early 1973. FRELIMO not only controlled much of northern Mozambique, but its penetration of the territory's central and southern provinces, and even the peripheries of major cities, was substantial.

The Carnation Revolution of April 1974 toppled Portugal's right-wing government and ushered in a junta managed by the Armed Forces Movement (MFA). The MFA soon announced that it would divest itself of the country's remaining colonies and end the costly colonial wars. FRELIMO responded that it would only pursue peace talks on the following conditions: Portuguese recognition of FRELIMO as the sole legitimate representative of the Mozambican people, recognition of the country's right to "complete independence", and the immediate transfer of power to FRELIMO. By September the MFA had confirmed it would comply with these conditions and effect a transition of power directly to FRELIMO, without a local referendum or elections. This alarmed Portugal's Western allies, the anti-communist white minority regimes in South Africa and Rhodesia, and the considerable population of white settlers in Mozambique. The MFA's announcement led to an attempted coup d'état by right-wing white Mozambicans, which was forcibly crushed by Portuguese troops. A report by the United States consulate there found "there is no doubt in our mind that post-independence FRELIMO-run Mozambique will be heavily influenced by Soviets and Chinese". The South African and Rhodesian governments feared that a sympathetic FRELIMO regime in Mozambique would likely provide a conduit for African nationalist insurgencies to launch raids into their own countries. For example, a South African military intelligence report at the time claimed that domestic insurgents "will enjoy much greater freedom of movement through...Mozambique while they will receive more direct and indirect moral and material support...the timescale according to which events will likely develop will be defined chiefly by the USSR and China: the two powers who have the greatest incentive to create and manipulate tension in southern Africa".

On 7 September, FRELIMO and Portugal signed the Lusaka Accord, which ended the country's war of independence. The Lusaka Accord set the date for formal independence: 25 June 1975. It also granted FRELIMO effective political ascendancy in Mozambique during the interim period as Portuguese administrators, civil servants, and military personnel departed. FRELIMO soon began a crackdown on its political opponents: FRELIMO defectors and members of the Partido de Coligação Nacional (PCN), a rival nationalist party, were rounded up and sent to re-education camps. Defectors living in exile were persuaded to return home with promises of receiving political amnesty, only to be arrested at the airport by FRELIMO security officials. A large number of FRELIMO defectors had taken refuge in Kenya, including former students and militants who refused to return home. Since the independence war was over, the United Nations High Commissioner for Refugees (UNHCR) stripped them of their refugee status and recommended they be involuntarily repatriated. Fearful of FRELIMO reprisals upon their return, the defectors staged demonstrations outside the UNHCR offices in Nairobi, prompting the Kenyan government to review their case and allow them to remain in that country.

=== Independence and early post-colonial era ===
The People's Republic of Mozambique was proclaimed upon independence in an elaborate ceremony on 25 June 1975. The initial independence day celebrations were held at Estádio da Machava; these were proceeded by a symbolic journey by newly appointed president and FRELIMO party chairman Samora Machel across Mozambique, beginning in the north where FRELIMO had first launched its armed struggle and culminating in the southern provinces. The new constitution of the People's Republic, which was completed by 20 June and took effect immediately upon independence, vested absolute power in the workers and peasants, "united and led by FRELIMO and by the organs of people's power". The constitution enshrined FRELIMO's ascendancy in a one-party socialist republic, declaring that FRELIMO was "the governing force of the state and society....FRELIMO outlines the basic orientation of the state and directs and supervises the action of state organs in order to ensure compliance with state policy with the interests of the people". The constitution also established a planned economy, although it made provision for the respect of personal property. Anti-social practices, such as discrimination or any act which the state deemed jeopardised social harmony, were made punishable offences under law.

Executive, legislative, and judiciary powers were vested in the ruling party. The party chairman of FRELIMO was also granted the role of state president, chief justice of the nation's courts, commander in chief of the armed forces, and the speaker of parliament. The national legislature was known as the People's Assembly and convened for four-day sessions twice a year. It was made up of 210 unelected representatives appointed to each seat by FRELIMO's political leadership. Due to the fact the legislature only met once a year, most legislation was proposed and in fact preemptively implemented by the executive branch; the People's Assembly merely ratified the president's decision upon convening. This permitted the president of the People's Republic to rule essentially by decree. With regard to the judiciary, the government banned all private law practice and called for a national legal consultancy to provide public defenders for those in court. No national legal consultancy was actually established until 1986, meaning those being tried in court had no recourse to legal counsel. Until the legal consultancy could be established, FRELIMO ruled that the organs of state were empowered to administer "people's justice", or otherwise extrajudicial and often arbitrary judgments without the use of the court system.

The first months of Samora Machel's presidency were marked by a series of sweeping reforms: the new government nationalised healthcare, education, and land. All forms of production and retail enterprise were nationalised shortly afterwards. FRELIMO also dictated that all broadcasting services must be brought under the control of a single state-owned broadcasting network, and instituted strict government control of the press. Machel declared that it was the responsibility of the state to impose the will of the peasant and worker majority, "even if it meant forcing those who refuse to accept such an imposition, and to repress those who oppose such a will". Attacks were also launched against the Mozambican intelligentsia. Although typically quite progressive and pro-FRELIMO prior to independence, intellectual and academic associations also had a longstanding democratic tradition, promoted free debate, and were open to diverse political ideas, all of which were regarded with suspicion by the new political establishment. A pervasive form of censorship was imposed; Machel announced that all "manifestations and influences of the bourgeoisie's decadent subculture would be purged". Elements of Western pop culture and music, for example, were banned for their "self-evident elitism".

FRELIMO began a campaign of mass politicisation: it attempted to organise every segment of the population into a local party chapter that also functioned as a workplace union. Unions were created for women, schoolchildren, teachers, journalists, writers, and workers. Party cells were established at all workplaces and in every residential area. Cities were divided into communal wards, which in turn were divided into blocs made up of units of ten families each. FRELIMO officials were appointed to politicise each bloc in that ward, which meant ensuring every resident was registered at the local FRELIMO cell and monitoring their respective incomes, lifestyles, and day-to-day activities. Family units were required to report guests and visitors to the official responsible for their bloc. Their movements were heavily restricted; to ensure compliance with the communal ward and bloc system, only registered persons were permitted to use hospitals, clinics, schools, and shops. Bloc registration also entitled residents to ration cards, without which they were prohibited from buying food. An internal passport granted by FRELIMO was required to travel outside one's residential area.

Following the Portuguese withdrawal, many rural Mozambicans moved out of the fortified settlements established as part of the wartime villagisation programme, returning to their ancestral homesteads. However, FRELIMO revived the villagisation campaign and forcibly herded large sections of the peasantry into collectivised agricultural co-operatives. By concentrating the rural population in these large collectivised settlements, FRELIMO insisted it could better provide the peasants with basic services and ideological indoctrination.

As part of their politicisation campaign, FRELIMO cells constantly reminded Mozambicans that the permanent enemies of the state were the abstract concepts of colonialism, imperialism, and capitalism. However, in the party's ideology, enemies closer to home were constantly being decoded and identified locally and were thus, potentially everywhere. Such enemies were defined as those who displayed anti-social behavior aimed at obstructing the government. Even the smallest deviance from the planned realities of collective blocs in the cities and collective villages in rural areas could be decoded as a sign of obstruction or resistance. To identify potential enemies of the state, the security services established an official network of informants, which eventually grew to number 17,000 in the Maputo area and 150,000 nationwide. Neighbours were encouraged to inform on each other and report on those who spoke positively about the new society's enemies.

== Climate ==
The People's Republic of Mozambique had a tropical climate with two seasons, a wet season from October to March and a dry season from April to September. Climatic conditions varied depending on altitude. Rainfall was typically heavy along the coast and decreased in the north and south. Annual precipitation varied from 500 to 900 mm (20 to 35 in) depending on the region, with an average of 590 mm (23 in). Cyclones were common during the wet season. Average temperature ranges in Maputo were from 13 to 24 °C (55 to 75 °F) in July and from 22 to 31 °C (72 to 88 °F) in February.

The People's Republic of Mozambique experienced numerous extreme weather events, most notable were Tropical Storm Domoina in 1984 and an extensive drought and famine from 1985 to 1987.

== Foreign relations ==
The People's Republic of Mozambique enjoyed close military, political, and economic ties with the member states of COMECON during its brief history, particularly the Soviet Union and Cuba. Both countries deployed military missions in Mozambique during the civil war to advise, train, and equip the People's Forces for the Liberation of Mozambique (FPLM). In 1978, there were up to 1,000 Soviet and Cuban military personnel deployed in the country. There were also large civilian technical contingents deployed; up to 600 Cuban and 650 Soviet technicians were in the country during the late 1980s, working on developing mining and rail infrastructure and fisheries. Both countries also provided vocational training and university scholarships to Mozambican nationals on especially generous terms. In 1987, for example, 4,000 Mozambicans received scholarships to study in Cuba, and 800 were receiving vocational instruction there. Between 1977 and 1990, the Soviet Union provided Mozambique with $105 million in financial aid. During the 1980s, it was the country's largest overseas trading partner, supplying a plurality of Mozambique's imported goods and all of its oil on credit. Many of the Soviet imports were directly bartered for agricultural goods produced by Mozambique's peasant farmers.

Despite the frosty diplomatic relations between the People's Republic of Mozambique and South Africa's avowedly anti-communist National Party government, economic realities ensured that certain practical ties were always retained. Throughout the civil war, Mozambique sold power from its hydroelectric complex on Cahora Bassa to South Africa, and South African investors always held a notable stake in the country's port facilities.

In the late 1980s, with Soviet economic influence waning, the People's Republic of Mozambique concluded its first major agreement with the International Monetary Fund (IMF), joined the Lomé Convention, and opened diplomatic relations with a number of states outside the Soviet bloc, namely West Germany.

== Armed forces ==
Upon independence in 1975 the guerilla forces of FRELIMO, the People's Forces for the Liberation of Mozambique (Forças Populares de Libertação de Moçambique - FPLM) was reorganised into the Armed Forces of Mozambique (Forças Armadas de Moçambique - FAM), the official designation being "Forças Armadas de Moçambique - FPLM."

The FAM was initially organised along similar lines to its predecessor, with no formal ranks besides from a system of "comandantes" who were elected to the position by fellow soldiers. FRELIMO and the FAM/FPLM were virtually indistinguishable from each other following their close relationship through the independence war. In December 1975 Mozambique was rocked by an abortive rebellion in Lourenço Marques (Maputo) when 400 troops of the FAM occupied strategic positions in Machava before being forced back by loyal police, military and civilians. The rebellion was in response to a crackdown and purge on corruption within the military and party.

== Education ==
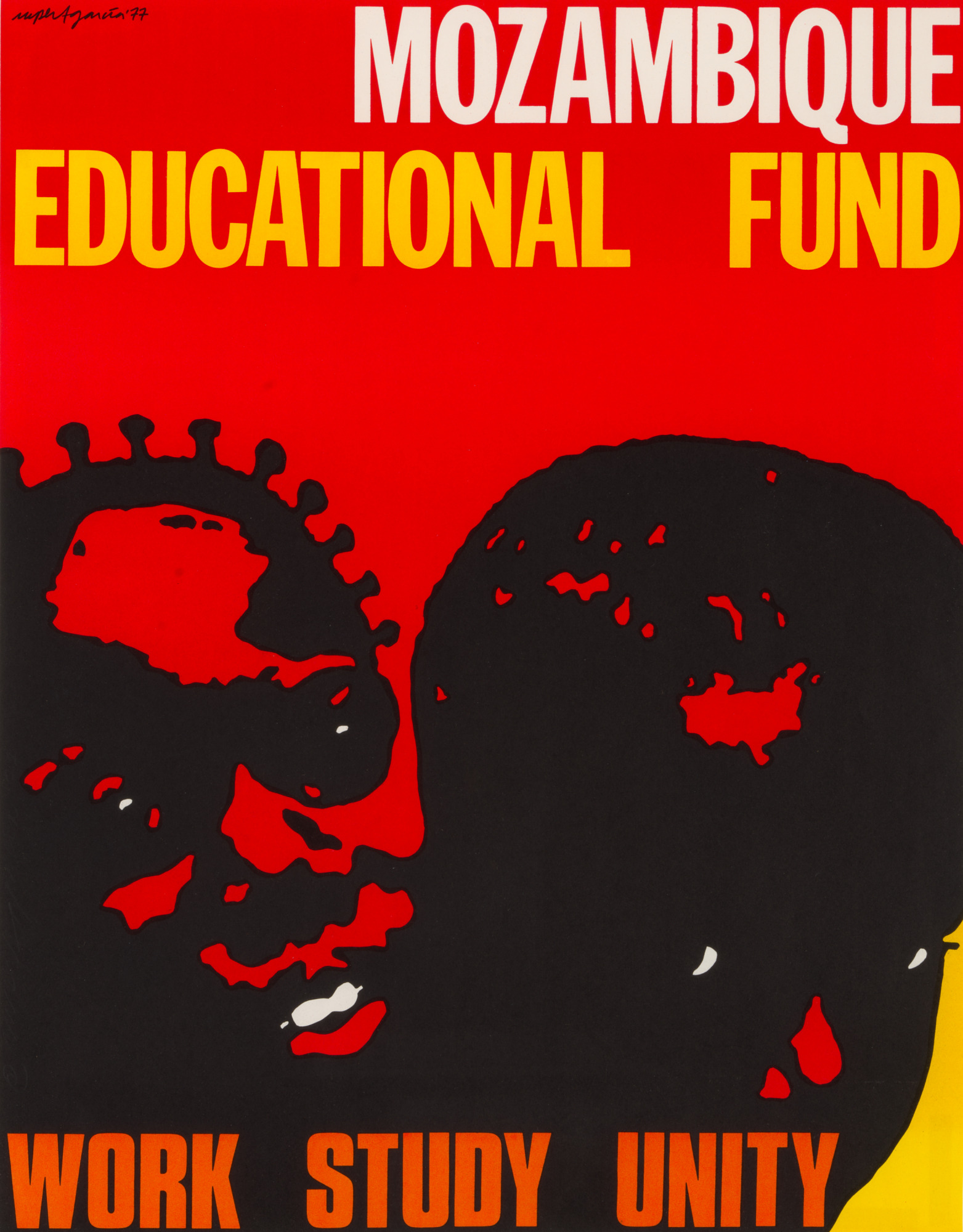
1977 poster by Rupert García for the Mozambique Educational Fund

Public schools lacked basic supplies, and fundraising efforts began by groups like the Mozambique Educational Fund in the United States.

== Culture ==
=== Public holidays ===
| Date | English name |
|---|---|
| 1 January | New Year's Day |
| 3 February | Heroes' Day |
| 7 April | Mozambican Women's Day |
| 1 May | Workers' Day |
| 25 June | Independence Day |
| 7 September | Victory Day |
| 25 September | Revolution Day |
| 4 October | Armed Forces Day |
| 25 December | Family Day |

== See also ==
- Mozambican War of Independence
- Mozambican Civil War

== Bibliography ==
- Priestland, David (2009). The Red Flag: a History of Communism. New York: Grove Press. ISBN 978-0-8021-4512-3.
- Christie, Iain (1988). Machel of Mozambique. Harare: Zimbabwe Publishing House. ISBN 978-0-949225-59-7.
- Isaacman, Allen & Barbara (1983). Mozambique: From Colonialism to Revolution. Boulder: Westview Press, Inc. ISBN 978-0-566-00548-0.
