= Independence movements in Mozambique =

Groups interested in freeing Mozambique from Portuguese colonial rule and making it an independent nation emerged in the early 1900s, shortly after Portugal had defeated the last of the native chieftaincies and established effective control over the territory.

== 1920s ==
In 1920 or 1923, a government sponsored organisation, the Liga Africana was established in Lisbon for assimilados, members of the tiny minority of Africans in the colonies who had been given citizenship status. Gibson states that "although it gathered together only some twenty African and mulatto intellectuals, [it] had significant repercussions in the colonies." Later, in Mozambique, the Associação Africana was established for assimilated mulattoes; and the Associação dos Naturais de Moçambique for Whites born in Mozambique. (In the 1950s the latter organisation opened its doors to non-Whites and fought for a non-racial society.) According to Chilcote, "Africans manifested demands through these organisations by urging moderate reforms in the 1930s and focusing discussion on direct participation for the urban masses in the 1940s. The government reacted by replacing elected leaders with administrative appointees and by dominating and interfering with the activities of these organisations." When the Associação Africana came partially under government control, the more determined of the nationalists in it formed the Instituto Negrófilo. This was later forced by the government to change its name to Centro Associativo dos Negros de Moçambique; and was banned in 1965 for alleged subversion and terrorism. The government also intervened in the Associação dos Naturais de Moçambique, replacing its leadership, and, according to Chilcote, ending its effectiveness.

Besides these groups a newspaper, O Brado Africano was established in the early 1920s. One of the first African weeklies on the continent, it provided an outlet for native dissent. Chilcote, in 1967, wrote that "Although controlled by the Salazar government, it remains African-oriented."

The Casa dos Estudantes do Império was a semi-official centre for African students in Lisbon. It was pronounced subversive and closed by the government in 1965.

== 1950s ==
By the mid 1950s clandestine political movements had formed. Above ground intellectual nationalism continued: African intellectuals studying at Portuguese universities established the Movimento Anti-Colonista (MAC) as an outgrowth of the Casa dos Estudantes do Império. A few of the African students in Portugal, including the Angolan Mário Pinto de Andrade and the Mozambican Marcelino dos Santos, left Portugal and settled in Paris, where, Chilcote says, they "associated with French African advocates of négritude and others who sought an African culture, traditional in tone but modern and sophisticated in content." In South Africa, Mozambican secondary-school students who had been sent there to study formed an offshoot of the Centro Associativo dos Negros de Moçambique called the Núcleo dos Estudantes Africanos Secundários de Moçambique (NESAM). Its tiny membership included several who would go on to become leaders in the liberation movement, including future FRELIMO president, Eduardo Mondlane.

At the second All-African Peoples' Conference, in Tunis, 1960, the MAC was superseded by the Frente Revolucionária Africana para a Indêpencia das Colônais Portuguesas (FRAIN).

In the 1950s and 1960s, government suppression of radicalism in Mozambique was severe enough that the important national liberation groups all had to carry on their existences outside the country. The first organisation with full intentions toward national liberation was founded by Mozambican exiles in Rhodesia (now Zimbabwe) and Nyasaland (now Malawi), on October 2, 1960, and called the União Democrática Nacional de Moçambique (UDENAMO). Its founding leader was Adelino Gwambe. Tanganyikan (now Tanzanian) president Julius Nyerere was sympathetic to the nationalists, and in April 1961 UDENAMO moved its headquarters to Tanganyika's capital, Dar es Salaam. Its members at various times included:

- Reverend Uria Simango (President), a Protestant pastor from the Beira region.
- J. M. Mabunde
- Paulo José Gumane

== 1960s ==
In February 1961 a second nationalist organisation, the Moçambique National African Union (MANU) was formed out of several small groups including the Mocambique Maconde Union of Northern Moçambique and Tanganyika. Its members had been inspired, and were supported by, the Kenya African National Union (KANU) and the Tanganyika African National Union (TANU). Matthew Mmole was founding president, and M. M. Mallianga Secretary-General. After Tanganyika's independence in December 1961, MANU moved to Dar es Salaam.

A third organisation, the União Africana de Moçambique Independente (UNAMI) was formed by exiles from the Tete district. It too moved to Dar es Salaam in 1961.

In April 1961 Adelino Gwambe travelled to Rabat to represent all three parties, UDENAMO, MANU and UNAMI, at the conference where FRAIN was disbanded and replaced by the Confederação das Organizações Nacionalistas das Colónias Portuguesas (CONCP).

In June 1962, with encouragement from both the CONCP and Nyerere, UDENAMO, MANU, and UNAMI merged to form the Frente de Libertação de Moçambique (FRELIMO). At the first FRELIMO congress, at Dar es Salaam in late September 1962, Eduardo Mondlane was elected its President. After many years of FRELIMO's struggle, Mozambique become independent in 1975.

== See also ==
- Mozambican War of Independence
- Portuguese Colonial War

== Sources ==
- Ronald Chilcote, Portuguese Africa. 1967; Englewood Cliffs, New Jersey, U.S.A.; Prentice-Hall.
- Richard Gibson, African Liberation Movements. 1972; London; Oxford University Press.
