= List of Mozambican flags =

The following is a list of flags of Mozambique. For more information, see Flag of Mozambique.

== National flag ==
Flag	Date	Use	Description
	1983–present	National flag and ensign of Mozambique	A horizontal tricolour of green, black, and gold with white fimbriations and a red isosceles triangle at the hoist. The triangle is charged with a five-pointed gold star which has above it an AK-47 crossed by a hoe, superimposed on an open book.

== Government flag ==
Flag	Date	Use	Description
Current
	1990–present	Flag of the president of Mozambique	The emblem of Mozambique inside of a white circle on a red field.
Former
	1933–1975	Flag of the governor of Mozambique	A white field with two vertical green lines and the emblem of Portugal over the cross of the Order of Christ.

== Military flags ==
Flag	Date	Use	Description
	1990–present	Flag of the Mozambique Defence Armed Forces	
	1990–present	Flag of the Mozambique Air Force	

== Flags of political parties ==
Flag	Date	Use	Description
Current
	2004–present	Flag of FRELIMO	The FRELIMO emblem in the upper hoist corner of a red field.
	????–present	Flag of RENAMO	A horizontal tricolour of blue, red, and black with white fimbriations. The RENAMO emblem sits in a white square that goes from the upper hoist to the second white stripe.
	2018–present	Flag of PODEMOS	Two equal horizontal bands of green and yellow with a vertical red band on the hoist side.
	????–present	Flag of the Party for the Development of Mozambique	A white isosceles triangle based on the hoist-side pointed towards the fly-side, dividing the flag into two right triangles where the upper triangle is red and the lower triangle is green with the emblem of the PDM centered on the hoist side of the white triangle.
Former
	1974–1975	First flag of FRELIMO	
	1997–2004	Second flag of FRELIMO	A red field. In the upper hoist corner, a crossed yellow hoe and hammer with a star above.
	1960–1962	Flag of UDENAMO	

== City flags ==
Flag	Date	Use	Description
	1975–present	Flag of Maputo	The Maputo emblem on the center of a light green field with yellow bordered line on dark green background.
Former
	1962–1975	Flag of Lourenço Marques (now Maputo)	Square yellow and green gyronny charged with the arms of Lourenço Marques.
	????–1962	Flag of Lourenço Marques (now Maputo)	Square green field charged with the arms of Lourenço Marques.

== Historical flags ==
Flag	Date	Use	Description
Pre independence (colonial) period (1505–1975)
	1505–1521	Colonial flag of Portuguese Mozambique	The escutcheon of Portugal with a crown over a white square.
	1521–1578	Colonial flag of Portuguese Mozambique	The escutcheon of Portugal with a crown over a white flag.
	1578–1640	Colonial flag of Portuguese Mozambique	The escutcheon of Portugal with a crown over a white flag.
	1640–1667	Colonial flag of Portuguese Mozambique	The escutcheon of Portugal with a crown over a white flag.
	1667–1707	Colonial flag of Portuguese Mozambique	The escutcheon of Portugal with a crown over a white flag.
	1707–1816	Colonial flag of Portuguese Mozambique	The escutcheon of Portugal with a crown over a white flag.
	1816–1826	Colonial flag of Portuguese Mozambique	The coat of arms of Portugal over a white flag.
	1826–1834	Colonial flag of Portuguese Mozambique	The escutcheon of Portugal with a crown over a white flag.
	1834–1910	Colonial flag of Portuguese Mozambique	The escutcheon of Portugal with a crown over a bicolour blue-white flag.
	1911–1975	Colonial flag of Portuguese Mozambique	The national arms of Portugal over a bicolour green-red flag.
	1932	Proposed colonial flag	
	1965	Proposed colonial flag	The flag of Portugal with the Colony arms on the bottom fly corner.
Post independence period (1975–present)
	1974–1975	First flag of Mozambique	
	1975–1983	Second flag of Mozambique	
	April 1983 – May 1st 1983	Third flag of Mozambique	
	1975–1983	Presidential flag	The emblem of Mozambique (1975–1983) inside of a white circle on a red field.
	1983–1990	Presidential flag	The emblem of Mozambique (1983–1990) inside of a white circle on a red field.

== See also ==
- Flag of Mozambique
- Emblem of Mozambique
