= Paulo José Gumane =

Paulo José Gumane (1918 – c. 1977) was a Mozambican union activist, politician and guerrilla leader active during the Mozambican War of Independence. A founder member of the independence movement FRELIMO (Frente de Libertação de Moçambique), he later broke with it and was involved with a number of opposition organisations, notably the Zambia-based COREMO (Comite Revolucionário de Moçambique).

Along with Uria Simango and a number of other FRELIMO dissidents, Gumane is thought to have been executed sometime during the period 1977–81.

== Life ==
Gumane is usually stated to have been born in 1918; some Portuguese records gave his birth date as 15 January 1922, in Malorane, Magaíça, Jangamo District, in Inhambane Province. He was the son of Samuel João Gumane, a farmer and Methodist deacon who later converted to Catholicism, and Mahigo Chicafo Marrengula. Following primary education he attended a teacher training college in Manhiça and taught in government and mission schools from 1936 to 1942. He later left Mozambique to find work, and became exposed to nationalist and left-wing political thinking among the Mozambican expatriate community in South Africa and Rhodesia. In South Africa he joined the African National Congress and later the Pan-Africanist Congress, and became Cape Town branch secretary of the Laundry and Dry Cleaner Workers' Union. In 1952 he was a prominent organiser in the Defiance Campaign, which demonstrated against apartheid laws. Returning to Mozambique, Gumane attempted to set up a farmers' trade union: the Portuguese colonial authorities issued a warrant for his arrest, but after being alerted by a friend within the government he evaded capture and escaped by stowing away on a ship to Cape Town.

Gumane was one of the founder members of the pro-independence National Democratic Union of Mozambique (UDENAMO) in 1960, and subsequently helped found its successor FRELIMO in 1962, becoming its Deputy Secretary-General. However, he was later expelled from the organisation after a series of disagreements over the American links of FRELIMO president Eduardo Mondlane. After a brief reconstitution of UDENAMO in Cairo, in 1965 Gumane and other dissidents founded a 'radicalist' splinter group, COREMO (Comite Revolucionário de Moçambique). COREMO, initially under the leadership of Adelino Gwambe, was principally sponsored by China, and was based in Zambia, from where it conducted small-scale guerrilla actions across the border. While China provided training, weapons and other materiel were channeled to COREMO through the Zambian government and the Pan-Africanist Congress.

On May 12–16, 1966 Gumane called an emergency party conference and deposed Gwambe for "gross financial and administrative malfeasance". Gumane assumed the presidency of the COREMO and steered it in a new, populist political direction: to contrast the group with FRELIMO he specified no special treatment for its leaders' children, no white membership, and maintained only a few low-profile offices in Cairo, Nairobi and Dar es Salaam. He adopted a strategy based on setting small-scale goals, issuing realistic communiques and on leading the organisation from within Mozambique's borders, all of which drew praise from external observers and supporters. Journalists were also impressed by Gumane, who was fluent in French, English, Portuguese and Spanish in addition to a number of African languages, and he was well liked amongst expatriate political activists: Andreas Shipanga recalled that he was affectionately known as "Uncle Gumane". However, after some initial military successes within Tete Province, COREMO began to lose impetus and was disrupted by internal disputes: Gumane nevertheless retained the backing of the Zambian president Kenneth Kaunda, who held him in high personal regard. COREMO continued to be involved in periodic clashes with both Portuguese troops and FRELIMO, and briefly gained wider public attention in January 1971 when its guerrillas abducted six Portuguese agricultural experts, later believed to have been executed, and five Mozambicans from Mussangadzi agricultural station.

Marcelino dos Santos and Samora Machel next to the captives Paulo Gumane (2nd from right) and Uria Simango in Nachingwea on May 11, 1975, prior to hearing Simango's forced confession on the next day.

From 1971 the Chinese government began to focus on supporting FRELIMO exclusively, and COREMO and other smaller opposition groups began to disappear from the public eye. Kaunda eventually authorised a secret military operation across the Mozambican border to eliminate the last COREMO guerrillas. While the majority of its senior figures were captured, Gumane escaped and made his way to Swaziland, where he continued organising opposition to FRELIMO.

After the 1974 Portuguese coup rendered Mozambican independence inevitable, Gumane along with other opposition leaders was one of the founders of the National Coalition Party (PCN), which called for free elections following the transfer of power. However, the Lusaka Accords of September 1974 handed power directly to FRELIMO and allowed it effectively to proceed with eliminating internal opposition. Gumane and other PCN leaders were called to Blantyre in Malawi on the pretext of an urgent cabinet meeting, and were arrested at the border before being handed over to FRELIMO troops.

Gumane was held in custody for several years. In 1975 he was shown in public at Nachingwea, Tanzania along with Uria Simango and a number of other former FRELIMO dissidents: both men presented lengthy 'confessions' of traitorous activities, following which they were sent to 're-education' camps. The prisoners subsequently disappeared and are presumed to have been executed during the period 1977–81, although the Mozambican government has to date refused to confirm their fate.

After his disappearance, Gumane's wife Priscilla was involved with the opposition group RENAMO.
