= Mondlane =

Mondlane is a surname of South African and Mozambican origin that may refer to:

- Agostinho Mondlane (born 1959), Mozambican politician
- Eduardo Mondlane (1920–1969), Mozambican communist
- Janet Mondlane (born 1934), Mozambican independence activist
- Nyeleti Brooke Mondlane (born 1962), Mozambican politician
- Salomão Mondlane (born 1995), Mozambican footballer
- Venâncio Mondlane (born 1974), Mozambican politician
