= Conference of Nationalist Organizations of the Portuguese Colonies =

The Conference of Nationalist Organizations of the Portuguese Colonies (Portuguese: Conferência das Organizações Nacionalistas das Colónias Portuguesas CONCP) was an organization for coordination and cooperation between the national liberation movements of the Portuguese colonies in Africa during the Portuguese Colonial War.

CONCP was founded on 18 April 1961 in Casablanca, Morocco by the PAIGC of Guinea-Bissau and Cape Verde, the MPLA of Angola, UDENAMO (later FRELIMO) of Mozambique and the MLSTP of São Tomé and Príncipe. A delegation of Indian nationalists from Goa also attended, including Aquino de Bragança. Marcelino dos Santos of UDENAMO was appointed CONCP's first secretary-general and Mário Pinto de Andrade of the MPLA as the first president. CONCP replaced the Revolutionary Front for the National Independence of the Portuguese Colonies (Portuguese: Frente Revolucionária Africana para a Independência Nacional das colonias portuguesas FRAIN) which had been established by the PAIGC and the MPLA in Tunis in 1960. A second meeting of CONCP was held in Dar es Salaam, Tanzania, in October 1965.

== See also ==
- Angolan Civil War
- National liberation groups in Mozambique
- Angola-Cape Verde relations
