= Public holidays in Mozambique =

This is a list of holidays in Mozambique

Date	English name	Description
January 1	New Year's Day	
February 3	Heroes' Day	Honors the soldiers who fought for independence in 1975; Assassination of Eduardo Mondlane
April 7	Mozambican Women's Day	
May 1	Workers' Day	
June 25	Independence Day	From Portugal, 1975
September 7	Victory Day	Lusaka Accord 1974.
September 25	Armed Forces Day	Also Armed Forces Day, marks the Mozambique Liberation Front (FRELIMO) launched its first offensive against the Portuguese colonial rulers in 1964.
October 4	Peace and Reconciliation Day	Marks the end of the Mozambican Civil War in 1992.
December 25	Family Day	

This is a list of City-specific holidays in Mozambique

Date	City
February 5	Matola
March 21	Tete
July 17	Chimoio
August 12	Inhambane
August 20	Beira, Mozambique
August 21	Quelimane
August 22	Nampula
August 23	Lichinga
October 7	Xai-Xai
October 18	Pemba
November 10	Maputo
