= Viva, Viva a FRELIMO =

1975–2002 national anthem of Mozambique

English: Long Live FRELIMO
- Former national anthem of Mozambique
- Lyrics: Justino Sigaulane Chemane, June 1975
- Music: Justino Sigaulane Chemane, June 1975
- Adopted: 25 June 1975
- Relinquished: 30 April 2002
- Succeeded by: "Pátria Amada"

Short instrumental recording

Vocal recording of the anthem

"Viva, Viva a FRELIMO" (English: "Long Live FRELIMO") was the national anthem of Mozambique from independence from Portugal on 25 June 1975 to 30 April 2002, when it was replaced by "Pátria Amada".

== History ==
The anthem was written by Justino Sigaulane Chemane in 1975 and adopted as the national anthem of the People's Republic of Mozambique on 25 June 1975. The lyrics celebrate Mozambique's independence, socialism and Mozambique's main political party, FRELIMO, which brought the country to its independence in 1975.

In 1994, multi-party elections were held in Mozambique, and consequently the lyrics to the anthem were often omitted from most public performances and radio broadcasts, as they were felt to be inappropriate in a multi-party, capitalist country. In April 1997, the government initiated a national contest to see who could write the best new lyrics for the national anthem. Initially, this contest sought to change the lyrics and keep the melody, however eventually the requirement for the melody was dropped. "Pátria Amada" became Mozambique's national anthem on 30 April 2002, after a majority vote by the Assembly of the Republic.

== Lyrics ==
Portuguese original

I
Viva Viva a FRELIMO,
Guia do Povo Moçambicano!
Povo heróico qu'arma em punho
O colonialismo derubou.

Todo o Povo unido,
Desde o Rovuma até o Maputo,
Luta contra imperialismo,
Continua e sempre vencerá.

Coro:
Viva Moçambique!
Viva a Bandeira, simbolo Nacional!
Viva Moçambique!
Que por ti o Povo lutará.

II
Unido ao mundo inteiro,
Lutando contra a burguesia,
Nossa Pátria será túmulo,
Do capitalismo e exploração.

O Povo Moçambicano
De operários e de camponeses,
Engajado no trabalho,
A riqueza sempre brotará.

Coro

IPA transcription (Note: See Help:IPA/Portuguese, Portuguese phonology and Mozambican Portuguese.)

1
[ˈvi.vɐ ˈvi.vɐ ɐ fɾɛ.ˈli.mu]
[ˈɡi.ɐ du ˈpo.vu mu.sɐ̃.bi.ˈkɐ.nu]
[ˈpo.v(u)‿e.ˈɾɔj.ku ˈkaɾ.mɐ‿ẽj̃ ˈpu.ɲu]
[u ko.lo.ɲɐ.ˈliʒ.mu de.ɾu.ˈbo(w)]

[ˈto.du(‿)u ˈpo.vu u.ˈni.du]
[ˈde(j)ʒ.dɨ‿u ʁo.ˈvu.mɐ‿ɐ.ˈtɛ‿u mɐ.ˈpu.tu]
[ˈlu.tɐ ˈkõ.tɾ(ɐ)‿ĩ.pɨ.ɾ(i)jɐ.ˈliʒ.mu]
[kõ.ti.ˈnu.ɐ‿i ˈsẽ.pɾɨ vẽ.sɨ.ˈɾa]

[ˈko.ɾu]
[ˈvi.vɐ mu.sɐ̃.bi.kɨ]
[ˈvi.vɐ ɐ bɐ̃.ˈdej.ɾɐ ˈsĩ.bu.lu nɐ.sju.ˈnal]
[ˈvi.vɐ mu.sɐ̃.bi.kɨ]
[kɨ puɾ ti u ˈpo.vu lu.tɐ.ˈɾa]

2
[u.ˈni.du aw ˈmũ.du‿ĩ.ˈtej.ɾu]
[lu.ˈtɐ̃.du ˈkõ.tɾɐ‿ɐ buɾ.gɨ.ˈzi.ɐ]
[ˈnɔ.sɐ ˈpa.tɾi.jɐ sɨ.ˈɾa ˈtu.m(u.)lu]
[du kɐ.p(i.)tɐ.ˈliʒ.mu i eʃ.plu.ɾɐ.ˈsɐ̃w]

[u ˈpo.vu mu.sɐ̃.bi.ˈkɐ.nu]
[dɨ ɔ.pe.ˈɾa.ɾjuz i‿dɨ kɐ̃.pu.ˈne.zɨʃ]
[ẽ.ɡɐ.ˈʒa.du nu tɾɐ.ˈba.ʎu]
[ɐ ʁi.ˈke.zɐ ˈsẽ.pɾɨ bɾu.tɐ.ˈɾa]

[ˈko.ɾu]

Official English translation

I
Long live, long live FRELIMO,
Guide of the Mozambican people!
Heroic people who, gun in hand,
toppled colonialism.

All the people united,
From the Rovuma to the Maputo,
Struggle against imperialism,
And continue and shall win.

Chorus:
Long live Mozambique!
Long live our flag, symbol of the nation,
Long live Mozambique!
For thee your people will fight

II
United with the whole world,
Struggling against the bourgeoisie,
Our Fatherland will be the tomb,
Of capitalism and exploitation.

The Mozambican people
Workers and peasants,
Engaged in work,
Shall always produce wealth.

Chorus

== See also ==
- List of national anthems
