= Mariano de Araújo Matsinhe =

Mozambican politician

Mariano de Araújo Matsinhe (born 29 September 1937) is a Mozambican politician. He was a member of the Politburo of FRELIMO during the 1980s (as such, he was a co-head of state between the death of Samora Machel on 19 October 1986 until the election of Joaquim Chissano on 6 November). Matsinhe also served as the Mozambican Security Minister in the 1980s.

== Sources ==
- "Leaders of Mozambique"
