= Casimiro Monteiro =

Portuguese military intelligence officer and law enforcement officer (1920–1993)

Casimiro Emérito Rosa Teles Jordão Monteiro (28 December 1920 – 25 January 1993), also known as Agente Monteiro, was a Portuguese covert operations military intelligence officer and law enforcement officer during the Estado Novo regime. He carried out state-sanctioned bombings and assassinations in Portugal, Mozambique and Goa. His actions were mostly focused against members of independence movements that existed in the Portuguese colonial empire.

As a PIDE agent, Monteiro tortured Indians in Goa (e.g. Mohan Ranade, an Indian independence activist) who were demanding the union of Portuguese India territories with the recently independent India. Monteiro is believed to have carried out the high-profile assassinations of Humberto Delgado and Eduardo Mondlane.

Following the Carnation Revolution in 1974, Monteiro lost his job and his immunity from prosecution. He received political asylum in apartherid South Africa and lived there in poverty as well as obscurity till his death.

== Early life ==
Monteiro was born on 28 December 1920 in Portuguese Goa to a Portuguese father and his Goan Catholic wife, an aguadeira (water supplier) from the city of Ponda. He lived in Portugal for some time before joining General Franco's army in the Spanish Civil War.

After the war, Monteiro moved to the United Kingdom, where he worked for a butcher whose daughter he married and had a son; although he abandoned his family after the Carnation Revolution when he lost the protection of the Portuguese government and was forced to flee Portugal to avoid prosecution and extradition to India.

== Portuguese Goa Era ==
In the 1950s, Monteiro joined the Portuguese Colonial Police in Goa, where he interrogated Goan liberation movement activists. Much of the brutal torture during interrogations took place at Valpoi Police Station and, eventually, Monteiro became infamous and feared throughout Portuguese India; by the closing years of Portuguese rule in India there were even several local theatre songs of the feared Agent Monteiro.

== PIDE agent ==
After Goa's annexation by the Indian Army in 1961, Monteiro was recruited by the Polícia Internacional e de Defesa do Estado (PIDE), the Portuguese Secret Service. Initially, he participated in a campaign to organise an anti-Indian resistance among Goans code named Plan Gralha. PIDE agents used the Emissona Nacional, radio station which continued to broadcast after 1961, to broadcast stories of Goan non-cooperation with Indian authorities. Plans were made to sabotage port facilities at Mormugao and Bombay. In 1962, a bomb was planted at Vasco Municipal School in March 1962, and another at a different location in October. Casimiro was implicated in bomb blasts on June 20, 1964. The Portuguese government, in an official statement to the UN, later claimed that the attacks were acts of revolt against Indian rule.

In 1965, he assassinated General Humberto Delgado in Spain. General Delgado was the Opposition Leader against the Salazar government. Monteiro, who had shot Delgado and strangled his secretary, was found guilty by the Spanish courts and was sentenced to 19 years in absentia.

In the late 1960s, Monteiro went to Portuguese Mozambique (as a PIDE agent) to fight FRELIMO (Frente de Libertação de Moçambique), a movement fighting for independence against the Portuguese colonial government. Most of the Frelimo fighters were based in Tanzania. Monteiro crossed into Tanzania, and using a parcel bomb assassinated Eduardo Mondlane, the founding leader of FRELIMO.

== Later life ==
He returned to Portugal, but after the 1974 Carnation Revolution, which overthrew the Estado Novo, Monteiro took refuge in the South African Embassy. He later moved to South Africa, where he spent the remainder of his life under the alias 'José Fernandez'. Almost blind and destitute (helped by the South African police), he died in 1993 at Richards Bay, South Africa.
