= Uria Simango =

Mozambican dissident

- Simango (far right) with fellow captive Paulo Gumane and captors Marcelino dos Santos Samora Machel on 11 May 1975. Simango and Gumane were quietly executed sometime over the next 5 years.
- Born: Uria Timoteo Simango; 15 March 1926; Mozambique
- Died: c. October 1979 (aged 52–53)
- Cause of death: Extrajudicial execution
- Political party: National Coalition Party (1974- ) FRELIMO (1962-1970)
- Movement: Mozambique Liberation
- Opponent: FRELIMO (after 1970)
- Criminal charges: Treason
- Criminal penalty: Execution
- Spouse: Celina

Uria Timoteo Simango (15 March 1926 - c. October 1979) was a Mozambican Presbyterian minister and prominent leader of the Mozambique Liberation Front (FRELIMO) during the liberation struggle against Portuguese colonial rule. His precise date of death is unknown, as he was extrajudicially executed along with his wife (Celina) and several other FRELIMO dissidents by the post-independence government of Samora Machel.

== Political dissidence ==
Simango was a founder member of FRELIMO, serving as Vice-President from its formation in 1962 until the time of the assassination of its first leader, Eduardo Mondlane, in February 1969. Simango succeeded Mondlane as FRELIMO's president but, in the power-struggle following Mondlane's death, his presidency was contested. In April 1969, his sole leadership was replaced by a triumvirate, where his role was shared with Marxist hardliners Samora Machel and Marcelino dos Santos. In the late 1960s, FRELIMO was blighted by fratricidal infighting with a number of party members dying of unnatural causes.

The triumvirate did not last; Simango was expelled from the Central Committee in November 1969, and Samora Machel and Marcelino dos Santos assumed total control. In April 1970, Simango left for Egypt where, with other dissidents like Paulo Gumane, FRELIMO's founding Deputy General Secretary, he became a leader of COREMO, another small liberation movement.

After the Portuguese Carnation Revolution in 1974, Simango returned to Mozambique and established a new political party, the National Coalition Party (PCN), in the hope of contesting elections with FRELIMO. He was joined in the PCN by other prominent figures of the liberation movement and the FRELIMO dissidents: Father Mateus Gwengere, Joana Simeão, and FRELIMO founding members Paulo Gumane and Adelino Gwambe.

FRELIMO opposed multi-party elections. The post-1974 Portuguese government handed over sole power to FRELIMO and Mozambique gained its independence on 25 June 1975. Machel and dos Santos took over as its first president and vice-president. Graça Machel was appointed as Minister of Education and Joaquim Chissano as Minister of Foreign Affairs. Uria Simango was arrested and forced to make a 20-page public confession on 12 May 1975 at the FRELIMO base in Nachingwea, recanting and requesting re-education. He was then obliged to read it aloud in front of thousands of FRELIMO fighters. Simango's confession includes claims, accusing colleagues of being agents of Portuguese secret services, and of involvement in Mondlane's murder. These "confessions" are no longer seen as credible, even among the present Mozambican leadership.

Simango and the remainder of the PCN leadership never regained freedom. Simango, Gumane, Simeao, Gwambe, Gwengere and others were all secretly executed at some undetermined date during 1977–1980. Simango's wife, Celina Simango, was separately executed sometime after 1981, but there are no details or dates for her death on public record. Neither the place of burial nor manner of their executions have ever been disclosed by the authorities, though scholar Phillip Rothwell believes Simango was killed in October 1979 and speculates his death was to prevent him from being used as a figurehead by other rebel groups such as RENAMO. In 2005, dos Santos reaffirmed the executions, calling Simango and the other dissidents "traitors against the Mozambican people."

As there was no judicial process, it remains unclear what prompted the charge of treason. On his return to Mozambique in 1974, according to his biographer Nkomo, Simango held tentative talks as leader of the PCN with white settler parties in a bid to garner strategic support against one-party rule. This presaged a settlement like that negotiated five years later in the Lancaster House Agreement for multi-party elections in Zimbabwe but, in 1974, it was viewed as treasonous by FRELIMO hardliners.

A biography of Simango was published in 2004.
