= Pátria Amada =

National anthem of Mozambique

English: Beloved Fatherland
- The emblem of Mozambique
- National anthem of Mozambique
- Lyrics: Salomão J. Manhiça, 2002
- Music: Salomão J. Manhiça; Justino Sigaulane Chemane (likely), 2002
- Adopted: 30 April 2002
- Preceded by: "Viva, Viva a FRELIMO"

Audio sample
- U.S. Navy Band instrumental version (one verse and chorus): file; help

"Pátria Amada" (Portuguese pronunciation: [ˈpatɾjaˈmaðɐ]; 'Beloved Fatherland') is the national anthem of Mozambique, approved by law in 2002 under Article 295 of the Constitution of Mozambique. It was written by Salomão J. Manhiça and replaced "Viva, Viva a FRELIMO" on 30 April 2002.

== History ==
The anthem is the second Mozambique has adopted after its independence, the first being "Viva, Viva a FRELIMO". The lyrics of the latter were removed in the 1990s, then the Parliament adopted a new anthem, "Pátria Amada", in 2002. Despite the fact that nine people took part in making the song, as recently as 2013, the Republic's Assembly recognised Manhiça as the author of the anthem. However, there are sources that claim others contributed to "Pátria Amada", including Justino Sigaulane Chemane, who composed the music, and Mia Couto.

== Lyrics ==
"Pátria Amada" has three verses, but usually only the first verse and chorus (which is repeated) are performed.

Portuguese lyrics (official)

I
Na memória de África e do Mundo (Note: De ("of") is sometimes written as da ("of the").)
Pátria bela dos que ousaram lutar
Moçambique, o teu nome é liberdade
O Sol de Junho para sempre brilhará

Coro:
𝄆 Moçambique nossa terra gloriosa
Pedra a pedra construindo um novo dia (Note: Um ("a") is sometimes written as o ("the").)
Milhões de braços, uma só força
Oh pátria amada, vamos vencer 𝄇

II
Povo unido do Rovuma ao Maputo
Colhe os frutos do combate pela paz
Cresce o sonho ondulando na bandeira
E vai lavrando na certeza do amanhã

Coro

III
Flores brotando do chão do teu suor
Pelos montes, pelos rios, pelo mar
Nós juramos por ti, oh Moçambique
Nenhum tirano nos irá escravizar

Coro

IPA transcription (Note: See Help:IPA/Portuguese, Portuguese phonology and Mozambican Portuguese.)

1
[nɐ mɨ.ˈmɔ.ɾjɐ di‿ˈa.fɾi.kɐ‿i du ˈmũ.du]
[ˈpa.tɾjɐ ˈbɛ.ɫɐ duʃ kɨ‿ow.ˈza.ɾɐ̃w ɫu.ˈtaɾ]
[mu.sɐ̃.ˈbi.kɨ | u tew ˈno.m‿ɛ ɫi.bɨɾ.ˈdɐ.dɨ]
[u sɔɫ dɨ ˈʒu.ɲu pɐ.ɾɐ ˈsẽ.pɾɨ bɾi.ʎɐ.ˈɾa]

[ˈko.ɾu]
𝄆 [mu.sɐ̃.ˈbi.kɨ ˈnɔ.sɐ ˈtɛ.ʁɐ gɫu.ɾi.ˈo.zɐ]
[ˈpɛ.dɾɐ‿ɐ ˈpɛ.dɾɐ kõʃ.tɾu.ˈĩ.dũ‿ũ ˈno.vu ˈdi.ɐ]
[mi.ˈʎõj̃ʒ‿dɨ ˈbɾa.suʃ | ˈu.mɐ sɔ ˈfoɾ.sɐ]
[o ˈpa.tɾjɐ‿ɐ.ˈma.dɐ | ˈva.muʒ‿vẽ.ˈseɾ]

2
[ˈpo.vu‿u.ˈni.du du ʁo.ˈvu.mɐ aw mɐ.ˈpu.tu]
[ˈko.ʎɨ‿uʃ ˈfɾu.tuʒ‿du kõ.ˈba.tɨ ˈpe.ɫɐ paʃ]
[ˈkɾe(ʃ).sɨ‿u ˈso.ɲu õ.du.ˈɫɐ̃.du nɐ bɐ̃.ˈdɐj.ɾa]
[i vaj ɫɐ.ˈvɾɐ̃.du nɐ sɨɾ.ˈte.zɐ du‿ɐ.mɐ.ˈɲɐ̃]

[ˈko.ɾu]

3
[ˈfɫo.ɾɨʒ‿bɾu.ˈtɐ̃.du du ʃɐ̃w du tew su.ˈɔɾ]
[ˈpe.ɫuʒ‿ˈmõ.tɨʃ | ˈpe.ɫuʒ‿ˈʁi.uʃ | ˈpe.ɫu maɾ]
[nɔʒ‿ʒu.ˈɾɐ.muʃ puɾ ti | o mu.sɐ̃.bi.kɨ]
[nɨ.ˈɲũ ti.ˈɾɐ.nu nuz‿i.ˈɾa ɨʃ.kɾɐ.vi.ˈzaɾ]

[ˈko.ɾu]

Swahili translation

I
Katika kumbukumbu ya Afrika na Ulimwengu
Nchi nzuri ya baba ya wale ambao walithubutu kupigana
Msumbiji, jina lako ni uhuru
Jua la Juni milele litaangaza

Kwaya:
𝄆 Msumbiji, Ardhi yetu Tukufu
Mwamba kwa mwamba ikiunda siku mpya
Mamilioni ya silaha kwa nguvu moja tu
Ee nchi ya baba wapendwa tutafanikiwa 𝄇

II
Watu wa umoja kutoka Rovuma hadi Maputo
Inavuna matunda ya kupigania Amani
Ndoto inakua ikipunga bendera
Na huenda kulima kwa hakika ya kesho

Kwaya

III
Maua kuchipua kwa mchanga wa jasho lako
Kwa milima, mito, bahari
Tunakuapia, Msumbiji
Hakuna jeuri atakayetutumikisha

Kwaya

English translation

I
In the memory of Africa and the World
Beautiful fatherland of those that dared to fight
Mozambique, your name is freedom
The Sun of June forever will shine

Chorus:
𝄆 Mozambique, our Glorious Land
Rock by rock constructing a new day
Millions of arms, only one force
O beloved fatherland, we shall overcome 𝄇

II
United people from the Rovuma to Maputo
Harvest the fruits of the combat for peace
The dream grows waving in the flag
And goes cultivating in the certainty of tomorrow

Chorus

III
Flowers sprouting of the soil of your sweat
In the mountains, in the rivers, in the sea
We swear by you, O Mozambique
No tyrant will enslave us

Chorus
