= Muhate =

Muhate is a surname. Notable people with the surname include:

- Basilio Muhate (born 1979), Mozambican economist and politician
- Cecilia Muhate (born 1997), Spanish basketball player
