= Flag of Mozambique =

Republic of Mozambique
- Use: National flag and ensign
- Proportion: 2:3
- Adopted: 1 May 1983; 43 years ago
- Design: A horizontal tricolour of green, black, and gold with white fimbriations and a red isosceles triangle at the hoist. The triangle is charged with a five-pointed gold star which has above it a bayonet-equipped AK-47 crossed by a hoe, superimposed on an open book.
- Designed by: FRELIMO

The national flag of Mozambique is a horizontal tricolour of green, black, and golden-yellow with white fimbriations and a red isosceles triangle at the hoist. The triangle is charged with a five-pointed gold star in its centre, above which there is a bayonet-equipped AK-47 crossed by a hoe, superimposed on an open book. The colours and symbols of the flag represent different aspects of the Mozambican people and their war of independence.

The current design, adopted on 1 May 1983, is defined in the Constitution of Mozambique, and regulations regarding the flag's use are outlined in decree no. 47/2006, titled State Protocol Standards. The design is based on the first flag of FRELIMO (Mozambique Liberation Front), which has governed the country since its independence from Portugal on 25 June 1975. Since the democratisation of Mozambique in 1990, there have been calls to change the flag, particularly to remove the rifle.

== Design ==
The design of the flag is described in Title XVI, Article 297 of the Constitution of Mozambique, 2004 (2007 revision):

From top to bottom, there shall be green, black, and gold horizontal stripes, separated by strips of white. On the left side, there shall be a red triangle, in the center of which there shall be a star. Above this there shall be a crossed hoe and gun, superimposed on a book.

While the constitution does not specify the number of points the star on the flag should have, it is universally depicted with five points, as seen, for example, on the official website of the Mozambican government. Similarly, the particular gun used in the design is not mentioned in the constitution, but it is generally understood to be an AK-47 with a bayonet attached. It is the only national flag that features a modern firearm.

=== Colours ===
The flag's colours are constitutionally defined, but their specific shades are not. The London Organising Committee of the Olympic and Paralympic Games used the following Pantone colour codes in 2012: green, PMS 355; yellow, PMS 109; and red, PMS 185. However, these shades differ from those used on the flag displayed on the Mozambican government's official website, which are green, PMS 328; yellow, PMS 102; and red, PMS 186.

=== Symbolism ===
The Mozambican constitution explains the significance of the flag's colours and symbols. Red represents anti-colonial resistance and national defence, green represents the country's soil; golden-yellow represents the country's subsoil, black represents the African continent, and white represents peace and "the justice of the struggle of the Mozambican people". The star represents "the spirit of international solidarity of the Mozambican people", while the book, hoe, and gun symbolise education, production, and defence, respectively.

== Protocol ==
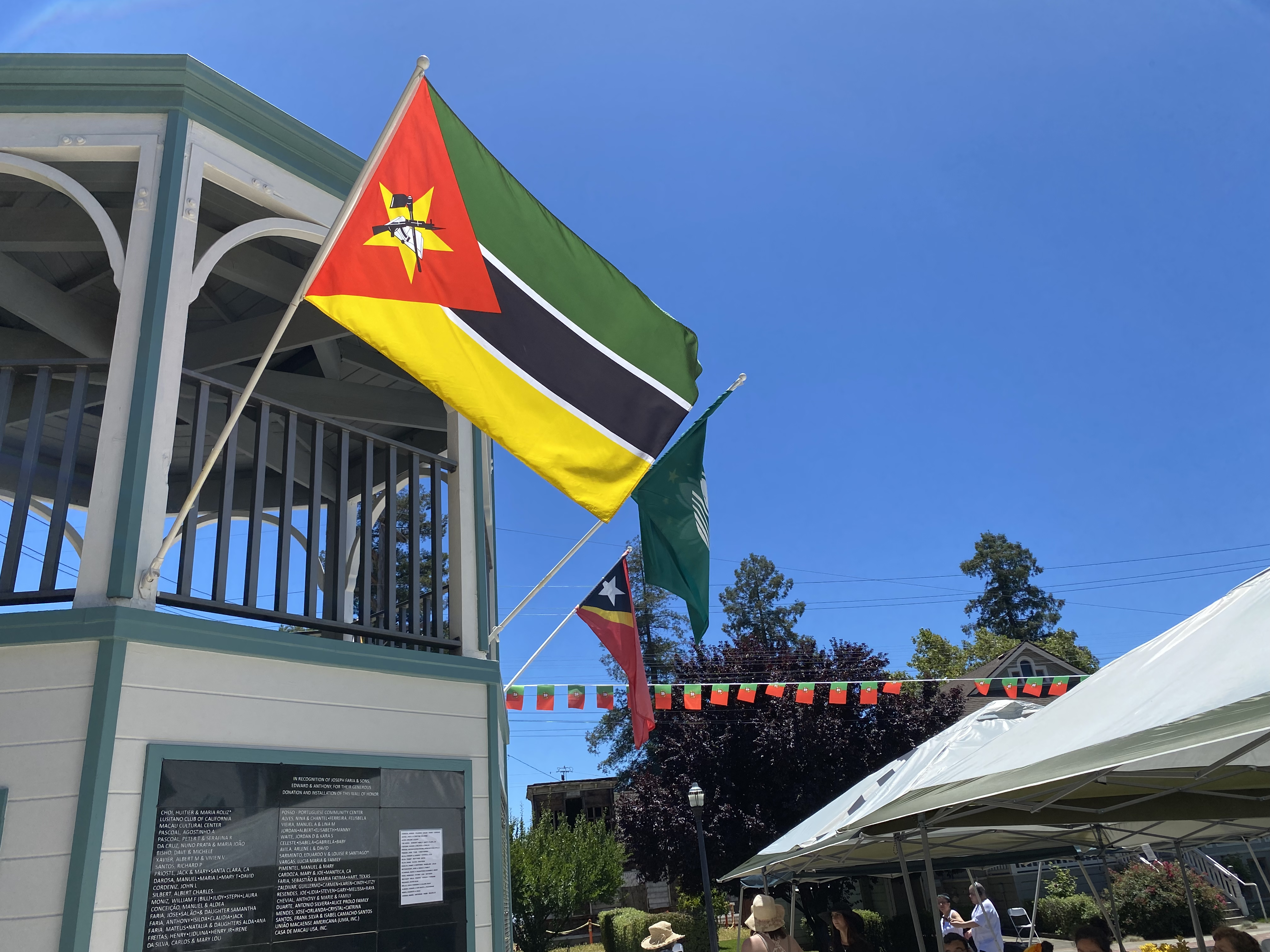
The flag of Mozambique at the Dia de Portugal Festival in San Jose, California. The flags of two other former Portuguese colonies, Macau and Timor-Leste, can be seen behind it.

The government of Mozambique outlined regulations regarding the use of the national flag in decree no. 47/2006, titled State Protocol Standards. Articles 49 and 50 of the law specify who may fly the flag and where it should be hoisted. The flag may be flown on public or private properties, and at events such as graduation ceremonies and parades. The flag should be flown at several locations, particularly state institutions, including government offices, barracks, airports, schools, and hospitals. (Note: The full list of locations is: Presidency of the Republic; Red Point Palace (Palácio da Ponta Vermelha); Assembly of the Republic; Residence of the President of the Assembly of the Republic; Prime Minister's office and official residence; Courts and Constitutional Council; Ministries; Provincial Governors' offices and their respective residences; Diplomatic and consular missions of the Republic of Mozambique abroad and residences of their respective heads of mission; Barracks; Police command of the Republic of Mozambique and police posts; Municipal councils; District directorates and services; District headquarters and administrative posts; Delegations and sub-delegations; Community leaders' residences; Public and private schools; Public and private hospitals; Airplanes; Helicopters; Balloons; Ships; Ports, airports and all border crossings; Headquarters of political parties and social organisations; Other public establishments) The following individuals are entitled to display the flag on their vehicles: the president of the country, the prime minister, the president of the Assembly of the Republic, the president of the supreme court, the president of the administrative court, the president of the constitutional council, provincial governors, and heads of diplomatic missions.

Despite the law, many state institutions and official residences hoist substandard flags or no flag at all due to financial and logistical challenges. For example, a 2023 report by the Mozambican newspaper O País ("The Country") found that most of these buildings in the western city of Tete did not fly the national flag. Those that did flew flags "in poor condition and with altered colours", including a flag at Francisco Manyanga Secondary School that was "completely torn".

== Historical flags ==
Mozambique flew the Portuguese flag when it was under Portuguese colonial rule. The Mozambican War of Independence between Portugal and FRELIMO (Mozambique Liberation Front) ended in September 1974 with the signing of the Lusaka Accord and the formation of a transitional government. During Mozambique's transition to independence, the flag of Portugal flew alongside the then flag of FRELIMO, which was similar to the country's current flag but without any charges on the triangle. American vexillologist Whitney Smith suggests that the design may have been inspired by the flag of Tanganyika, where FRELIMO had been operating in exile. British vexillologist William Crampton meanwhile claims that the flag of South Africa's African National Congress was the source of FRELIMO's inspiration.

The People's Republic of Mozambique proclaimed its independence on 25 June 1975, and a new national flag was hoisted in place of the Portuguese and FRELIMO flags. The new flag's design and significance were defined in Title IV, Article 68 of the Constitution of the People's Republic of Mozambique (in effect from 1975 to 1990). The flag consisted of four diagonal stripes emanating from the upper hoist, separated by white fimbriations. The stripes were, from top to bottom, green, red, black, and yellow. Near the upper hoist was a white cogwheel, charged with a red star and an AK-47 crossed by a hoe, superimposed on an open book. The colours and symbols of the People's Republic flag retained by the current flag share the same meaning. The other symbols were given the following significance by the Mozambican government: the cogwheel represents the working class and industrial production, while the red star represents proletarian internationalism. The flag was changed in April 1983 to an alteration of the FRELIMO flag; the previous flag's charge was placed on top of a large yellow star inside the red triangle. The cogwheel was removed shortly thereafter on 1 May 1983, leading to the flag's present design.

First flag of FRELIMO

Flag of Mozambique
(25 June 1975 – April 1983)

Flag of Mozambique
(April 1983 – 1 May 1983)

== Proposals to change the flag ==
The drafting of a new Mozambican Constitution in 1990 started discussions on changing the country's national symbols, including the national flag. Critics argued that, because the national flag resembled the flag of FRELIMO, it was antithetical to calls for national unity. Jorge Rebelo, a member of FRELIMO's political bureau, acknowledged the debates surrounding the flag but stated that it would remain unchanged. Since then, the primary criticism has been directed at the inclusion of the AK-47 on the flag, which some Mozambicans view as an allusion to violence.

In 2005, the Mozambican government held a competition to design a new national flag and emblem, as part of a peace agreement between FRELIMO and RENAMO (Mozambican National Resistance). RENAMO had fought FRELIMO in a civil war that lasted sixteen years, before it became Mozambique's main opposition party. RENAMO called for the removal of the AK-47 and star from the flag. José Gabriel Manteigas, a RENAMO member of parliament, gave the following critique:

As a peaceful country, you can't have a flag with a gun on it. For children growing up now in peace, they see a flag with a gun on it, and it doesn't make sense. As for the star, anyone who has seen the Soviet flag knows that a star is the mark of communism. It is true that the Mozambique flag's yellow star seems borrowed from an earlier FRELIMO flag with a crossed hammer and hoe under a yellow star, a blood relative of the old Soviet hammer and sickle.

Then Mozambican president Joaquim Chissano, previously the leader of FRELIMO, responded to Manteigas's criticisms by saying: "If Mozambique's single star were to symbolise communism, the Stars and Stripes would place the United States among the world's most leftist nations." In further defence of the flag, FRELIMO supporters argued that the AK-47 is a symbol of the Mozambican people's determination to protect their country, and the star is a symbol of African solidarity.

A total of 169 entries were received during the 2005 competition, all of which were reviewed by a panel of five judges. The proposals were ultimately rejected by the Assembly of the Republic, which voted 155 to 79 against changing the flag. All the votes against were from FRELIMO, and all the votes for were from RENAMO.

== See also ==
- List of Mozambican flags
