= Political Bureau of the Central Committee of FRELIMO =

Leadership
- Elected by: FRELIMO Central Committee
- Responsible to: FRELIMO Central Committee
- Seats: 10

Meeting place
- People's Assembly, Maputo

The Political Bureau of the Central Committee of FRELIMO was a Politburo which briefly assumed the responsibilities of the President of the People's Republic of Mozambique between 19 October 1986 and 6 November 1986 following the death of Samora Machel in a plane crash and the election of Joaquim Chissano to succeed him. The Politburo was reformed in 1989 at the FRELIMO Party 5th Congress.

== Membership in 1986 ==
- Marcelino dos Santos
- Joaquim Chissano
- Alberto Chipande
- Armando Guebuza
- Jorge Rebelo
- Mariano de Araújo Matsinhe
- Sebastião Marcos Mabote
- Jacinto Soares Veloso
- Mário da Graça Machungo
- José Óscar Monteiro

== See also ==
- List of presidents of Mozambique
