= Mozambican Youth Organisation =

Youth wing of the FRELIMO party

Mozambican Youth Organisation Organização da Juventude Moçambicana
- Secretary General: Constantino André
- Founded: 1977
- Headquarters: Av. da Frente de Libertação de Moçamnique nº 147 7º Andar, Maputo
- Mother party: FRELIMO
- International affiliation: World Federation of Democratic Youth (WFDY)
- Website: http://ojm.org.mz

The Mozambican Youth Organisation (Portuguese: Organização da Juventude Moçambicana, OJM), the oldest and largest youth organisation in Mozambique, is the youth wing of the FRELIMO party. It was created on November 29, 1977 and today has more than 2.8 million members. The organisation's vision is to promote patriotism, education and mobilization among young people and engage them in the challenges of development in Mozambique.

The OJM has been led by politician Silva Fernando Livone since 2020. Its objective is enshrined in the Constitution of the Republic: to promote the patriotic education of young people, mobilizing them for the political and ideological objectives of the Frelimo Party. The organisation exists to promote and defend the aspirations and interests of its members and youth in general, and to ensure their representation in national and international forums.

== National structure ==
As set out in its constitution the Mozambican Youth Organisation is led by a National Secretariat of Central Committee (SCC) and a National Council of Jurisdiction (CJN).

=== Secretariat of the Central Committee ===
- General Secretary (Chairman) – Silva Fernando Livone
- Organisation and Training – Francisco Nunes Armeca
- Mobilization and Propaganda – Baera Bento Moreira
- Administration and Finance – Patricia Mendonça Lopes
- International Cooperation and Projects – Edma Luzia Aguiar Bruand
- Student Movement and Volunteers - Jherson Fernandes
- Jurisdiction Council President - Constantino André

== Leaders ==
OJM leaders include:

- Zacarias Kupela: 1977 - 1991
- Leonardo Candeeiro: 1991 - 1998
- Gaspar Sitoe: 1998 - 2005
- José Patrício André: 2005 - 2010
- Basílio Muhate: 2010 - 2013
- Pedro Cossa: 2013 - 2015
- Mety Gondola: 2015 -2020
- Anchia Formiga: 2020-2022
- Silva Livone: 2022-present
