= Joana Simeão =

Mozambican resistance leader

Joana Simeão was a Mozambican resistance leader. During the Mozambican War of Independence in the 1960s, Simeão was a member of the Frente Comum de Moçambique (Mozambican Common Front), a branch of the Mozambique Revolutionary Committee. Simeão was involved with the Grupo Unido de Moçambique (United Group of Mozambique) in 1974, seeking independence from Portugal. She took a leadership position within the group, but she was eventually expelled. After an independence agreement granted control of the country to FRELIMO in September 1974, Simeão was among the leadership of the anti-FRELIMO resistance, and she participated in the occupation of an airport and a radio station. Simeão was arrested by FRELIMO forces for her role in the rebellion. FRELIMO accused Simeão of being an agent of the Portuguese secret police PIDE, and Simeão was executed along with other resistance leaders by FRELIMO in an undisclosed time and place.
