= Janet Mondlane =

American-born Mozambican politician

Janet Rae Mondlane (née Johnson) is an American-born Mozambican activist. Together with her husband, Eduardo Chivambo Mondlane, she founded FRELIMO and helped organize the liberation of Mozambique from Portuguese colonialism.

Janet Rae Johnson was born in 1934 in Illinois. In 1951, at the age of 17, she attended a church camp in Geneva, Wisconsin, where she met the 31 year old Eduardo Mondlane, who was giving a speech about the future of Africa.

In 1956, five years later, they married after she received her B.A. and he his M.A. At the time of their marriage, Janet was 22 and Eduardo 36. They had three children, Eduardo, Jr., Chude, and Nyeleti.

In 1963, the Mondlanes moved with their family to Dar es Salaam, Tanganyika in order to organize the liberation factions fighting the Portuguese in Mozambique. Together they helped form Frelimo, and Mondlane was the director of the Mozambique Institute, the nonmilitary branch of Frelimo. The Institute organized health care and secondary education and raised funds for scholarships abroad for Mozambicans.

After independence in 1975 she held positions within the Mozambican government, and was general secretary of the National AIDS council from 2000 to 2003. She established the Eduardo Chivambo Mondlane Foundation in 1996.

In 2011, she received an honorary doctorate in Education Sciences from Universidade Eduardo Mondlane in Maputo, Mozambique.
