= Isabel Nkavadeka =

Mozambican politician

Isabel Manuel Nkavadeka is a Mozambican politician. She is a member of FRELIMO and was elected to the Assembly of the Republic of Mozambique in 1999 from the Cabo Delgado Province. In 2004, she was also a member of the Pan-African Parliament from Mozambique.

In 2005, she was Minister for Parliamentary Affairs.
