= Nyeleti Brooke Mondlane =

Mozambican politician (born 1962)

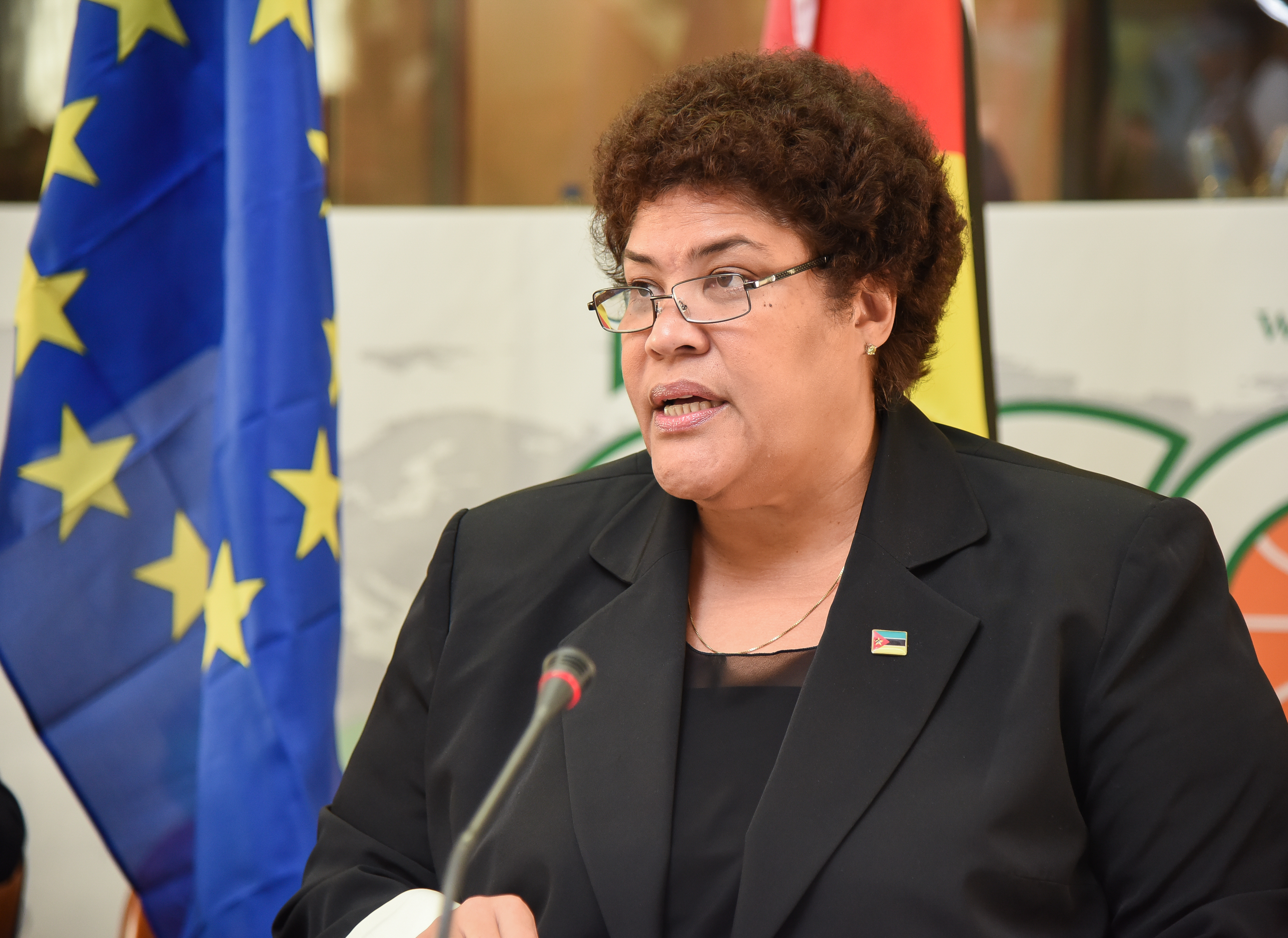
- Nyeleti Brooke Mondlane in 2015
- Born: 17 January 1962 (age 64); Syracuse, New York, USA
- Occupations: Politician, Minister of Gender and Children and Social Action of Mozambique

Nyeleti Brooke Mondlane (born January 17, 1962) is a politician in Mozambique. She is the daughter of FRELIMO President Eduardo Mondlane and American-born activist and politician Janet Mondlane.

Mondlane was a member of the Assembly of the Republic from 1994 to 2014, and vice-minister for foreign affairs. She became Minister of Gender, Children and Social Welfare in 2020.
