= José Gabriel Manteigas =

Mozambican politician

José Gabriel Manteigas is a Mozambican politician. He is a member of parliament with RENAMO from the Zambezia Province. In 2004, he was also a member of the Pan-African Parliament.
