= Basilio Muhate =

Mozambican politician

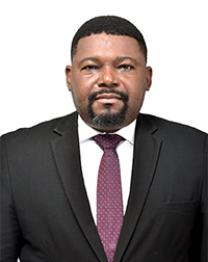

Basílio Zefanias Muhate (born 28 September 1979 in Chimoio), Minister of Economy of Mozambique, is a Mozambican economist and politician, who served as economist in Banco de Mocambique (The Central Bank), Member of The Board of Cimentos de Mocambique and Domus, chairman (General Secretary) of the FRELIMO Party's youth organization, the Mozambican Youth Organisation (OJM), and as member of the Central Committee of FRELIMO since November 2010. Muhate studied economics at Eduardo Mondlane University is a member of the Mozambican Association of Economists (AMECON), blogger columnist and commentator on economics.

Basilio Muhate ceased his functions as General Secretary of OJM in 2013, along with the entire leadership of OJM, for reasons not yet made public officially by the leadership of Frelimo Party and after younger party activists made their voices heard with demands that the resources windfall should be managed for the benefit of the wider society and not monopolised by anyone.
