= National Democratic Union of Mozambique =

- Secretary: Uria Simango
- Founded: 2 October 1960
- Dissolved: June 1962
- Merged into: FRELIMO
- Ideology: African nationalism National liberation
- Continental affiliation: CONCP

Party flag
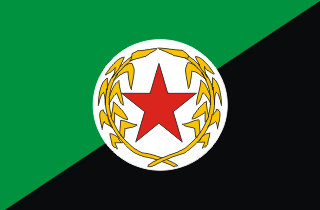

The National Democratic Union of Mozambique (Portuguese: União Democrática Nacional de Moçambique, UDENAMO) was a nationalist organization founded in Salisbury, Southern Rhodesia (present-day Harare, Zimbabwe) in 1960. It was led by Adelino Gwambe and consisted mostly of migrant workers and disgruntled students who had fled central and southern regions of Mozambique. It was formed to oppose Portuguese colonial rule in Mozambique. In June 1962, UDENAMO merged with two other nationalist organizations, the National African Union of Independent Mozambique (UNAMI) and Mozambican African National Union (MANU) to form the Mozambique Liberation Front (FRELIMO).
