= Marcelino dos Santos =

Mozambican poet, revolutionary, and politician (1929–2020)

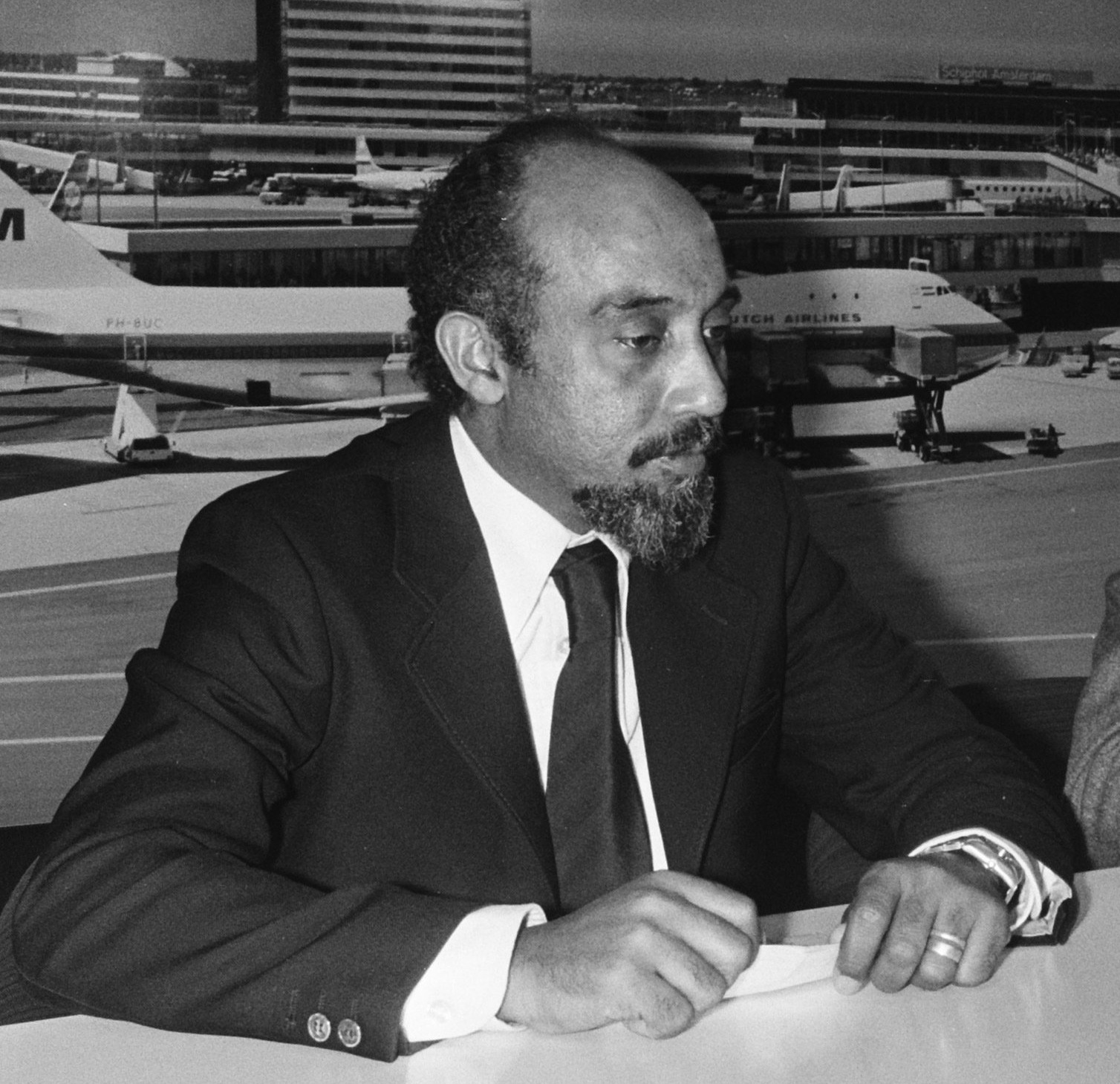
- Dos Santos in 1975

President of the People's Assembly
- In office 1986 – 12 January 1995
- Preceded by: Samora Machel
- Succeeded by: Eduardo Mulémbwè

Vice President of Liberation Front of Mozambique
- In office 14 May 1970 – 30 May 1977
- President: Samora Machel
- Preceded by: Uria Simango
- Succeeded by: Office abolished

Personal details
- Born: 20 May 1929 Lumbo, Portuguese East Africa (now Mozambique)
- Died: 11 February 2020 (aged 90) Maputo, Mozambique
- Party: FRELIMO

Marcelino dos Santos (20 May 1929 – 11 February 2020) was a Mozambican poet, revolutionary, and politician. As a young man he travelled to Portugal, and France for an education. He was a founding member of the Frente de Libertação de Moçambique (FRELIMO—Mozambican Liberation Front), in 1962, and served as the party's deputy president from 1969 to 1977. He was Minister of Economic Development in the late 1970s, FRELIMO Political Bureau member in charge of the economy in the early 1980s, chairman of the country's parliament, the Assembly of the Republic, from 1987 to 1994, and, as of 1999, remained a member of the FRELIMO Central Committee. He represented the left wing of the party, remaining an avowed Marxist-Leninist, despite the party's embrace of capitalism in recent decades, an embrace which dos Santos declared was temporary.

Under the pseudonyms Kalungano and Lilinho Micaia, he published his early poems in O Brado Africano, and his work appeared in two anthologies produced by the Casa dos Estudantes do Imperio in Lisbon. Under the pen-name Lilinho Micaia, a collection of his poetry was published in the Soviet Union. Under his real name, he had a book published by the Associação dos Escritores Moçambicanos (Mozambican Writers' Association) in 1987, entitled Canto do Amor Natural.

FRELIMO Party

== Early life ==
Marcelino dos Santos was born May 20, 1929, in Lumbo, Mozambique. His father was Firmino dos Santos and his mother was Tereza Sabina dos Santos. Firmino dos Santos was a political activist belonging to the African Association of Mozambique. He grew up in Lourenço Marques (now Maputo) the capital of Mozambique. He started working at a factory under the control of the Portugal labor regime and came face to face with the violence and racism against the factory workers in Mozambique. With his father's political affiliations and these early labor experience Dos Santos began to put together his own ideas. When he was 18 he left Mozambique to go to school in Lisbon, Portugal it was there where he expressed his fathers ideas of unity among those oppressed by Portugals colonialism through his writing and poems. At the House for Students of the Empire in Lisbon, dos Santos and others increasingly spread their nationalist sentiments. Some of the men dos Santos overlapped and shared his ideas with were Amílcar Cabral, Agostinho Neto, and Eduardo Mondlane all eventual nationalist leaders in Guinea Bissau, Angola, and Mozambique.

== Exile in Paris ==
In the early 1950s when these nationalist students came to attention of the Portuguese police, Dos Santo escaped to France where he worked with other exiled African nationalists. In Paris, dos Santos lived among leftist African writers and artists who contributed to the literary journal Presence Africaine. Using the pen names Kalungano in Portuguese language publications and Lilinho Micaia for the collection of poetry published in the Soviet Union, he published several poems. He urged Portuguese political exiles in Paris to increase their opposition to the Salazar regime in Portugal and embrace the nationalist cause for Africa. He played a large role in the formation of the Anti-Colonial Movement (MAC) in Paris in 1957. He joined the Paris branch of the União Democrática Nacional de Moçambique (UDENAMO), a nationalist group that merged to create the Frente de Libertação de Moçambique (FRELIMO). He was involved in the founding of the Conference of Nationalist Organisations of the Portuguese Colonies (CONCP) at Casablanca, and elected permanent secretary in charge of co-ordinating nationalist activity.

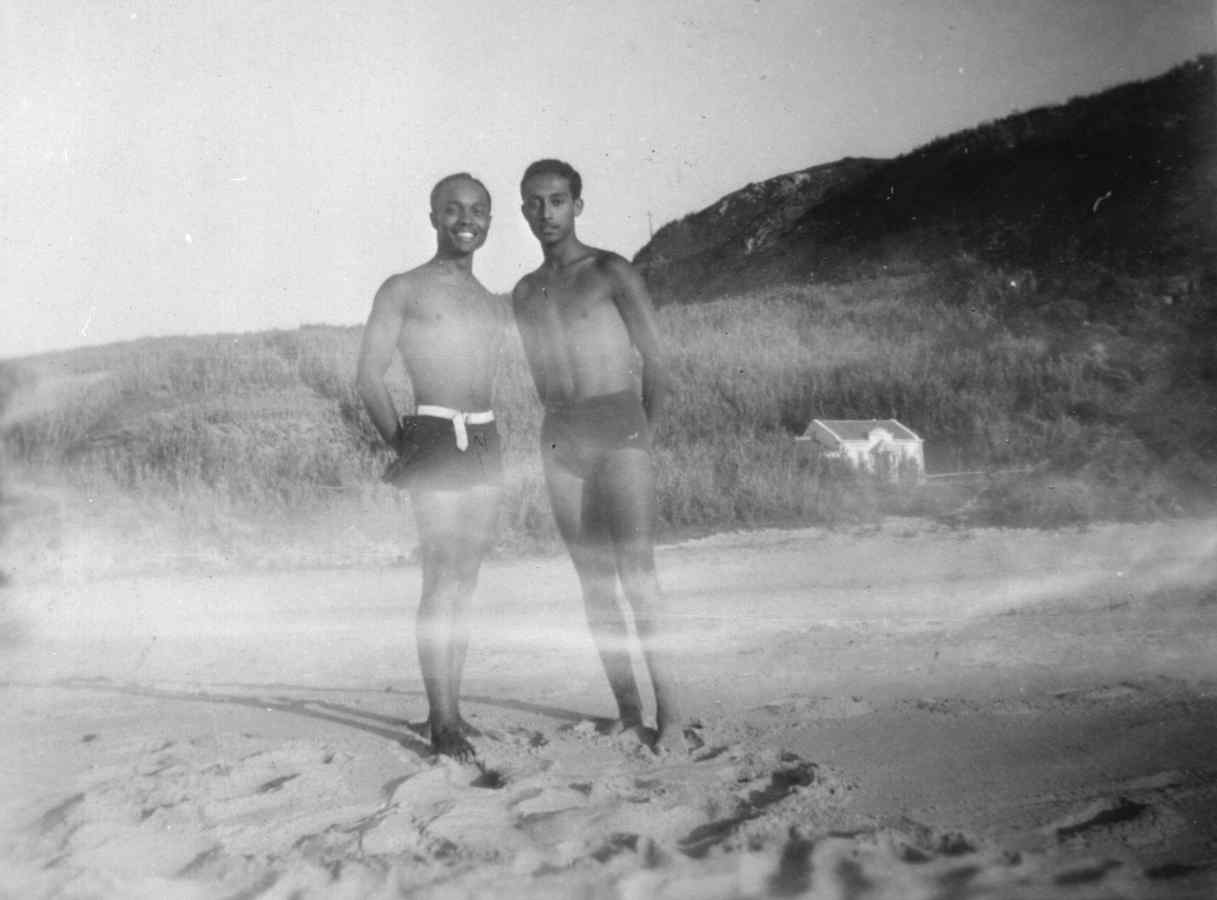
Amilcar Cabral and Marcelino dos Santos in Portugal

== FRELIMO founding ==
Eduardo Mondlane, one of the very influential African nationalists dos Santos had gotten to know in Portugal, decided to try and put in motion the ideas of a united front for African colonies under Portuguese rule to start the fight for independence, and dos Santos lent his support. The connections that Marcelino and Mondlane made in their youth as scholars were a crucial part of FRELIMO's success, as Julius Nyerere pledged support to Mozambique, while operating out of Tanzania. Marcelino and others who had studied in Portugal were the ones who made up the founders. This was the founding of the Front for the Liberation of Mozambique (FRELIMO). FRELIMO, the party which undertook and waged the war for independence from Portugal, held its first congress in Tanzania in September 1962. The three major Mozambican parties that were UDENAMO (União Democrática Nacional de Moçambique); MANU (Mozambique African Nationalist Union); and UNAHI (Uniao Africana de Hocambique lndependente) combined to form FRELIMO.

== FRELIMO policies ==
Since FRELIMO was a liberation movement they were very dependent on help and support from different nations and organizations. Ways of acquiring supplies and arms for guerrilla warfare were part of the goal but also there was a strong focus on gaining support from the U.N. In process of gaining others support the party hoped to distance and isolate Portugal from the rest of the world believing that this would significantly weaken their hold on the African colonies. Many different countries contributed to FRELIMO's cause a number of African countries helped seeing that no African state could be free with white colonialism existing in Africa. Socialist countries such as the Soviet Union and China contributed substantially to the efforts the Soviet Union was especially helpful because of their place on the U.N. Security Council where they continued to vote against Portuguese colonialization. The proposed spending of FRELIMO is meant to be on military action against Portugal. With Mondlane at the head as president of FRELIMO they appeal to human freedom, democracy and world peace.

== Marcelino's wife ==
Pamele dos Santos (née Beira) was born in Johannesburg in South Africa on 19 June 1942 to Banny and Golda Beira. She joined the African National Congress (ANC) November, 1961 dos Santos and Joe Louw were arrested under the Immorality Act. They were charged and went to trial. She decided to leave South Africa and ended up in Tanzania where she quickly met Marcelino dos Santos. Pamela and Marcelino had a daughter in Oct 1963 and eventually married in 1968. Both Mondlane and Marcelino dos Santos were married to white women. Problems arose as some thought it was hypocritical of these leaders to discuss how to fight white domination in Mozambique while being married to a white woman.

== Political career ==
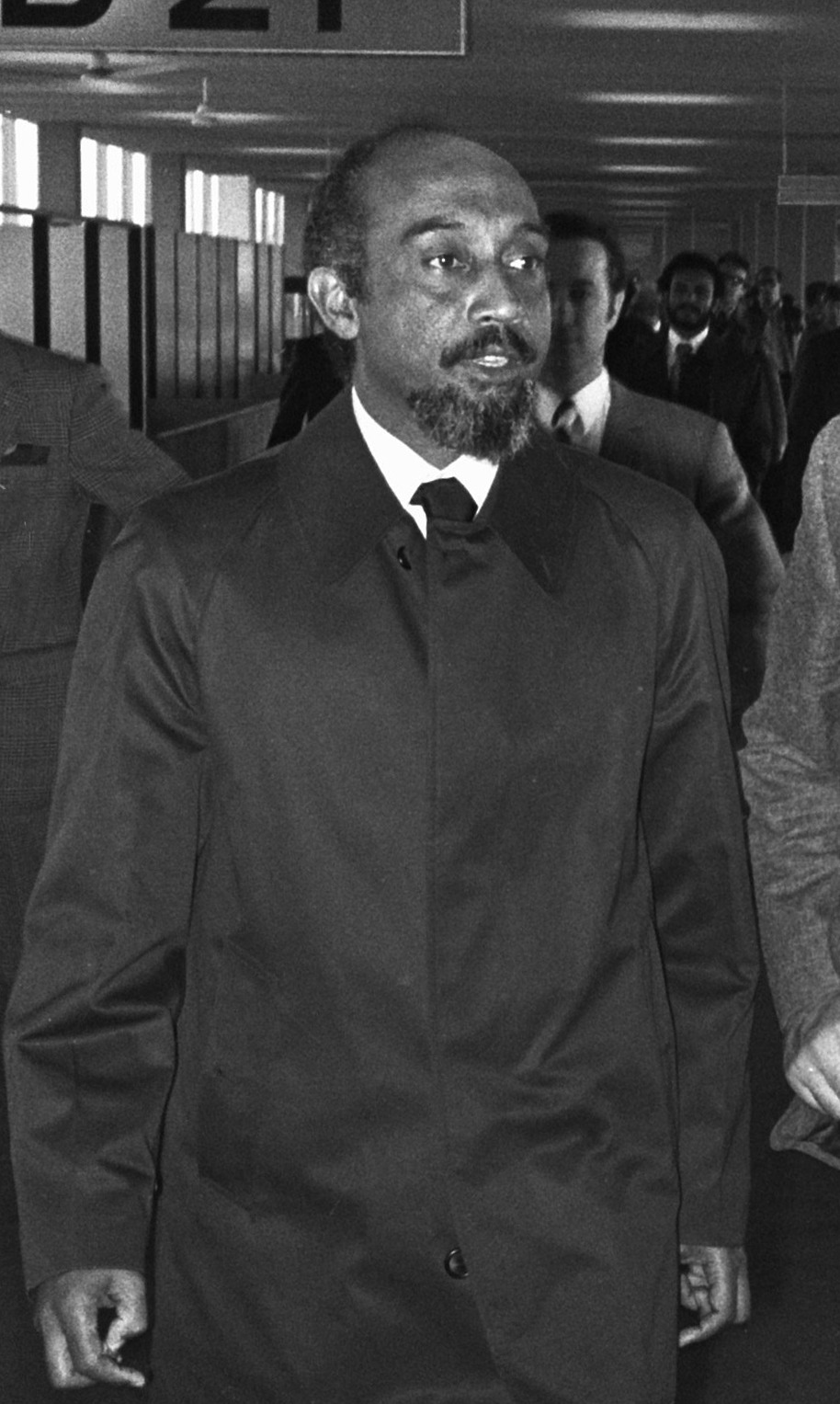
Marcelino dos Santos in 1975

Mondlane, the rather moderate leader of FRELIMO who had been a lecturer in the US and a United Nations official, was murdered on 2 February 1969, with the clear involvement of the pro-Soviet faction within FRELIMO under Uria Simango and Samora Machel. His death was very mysterious and no murderer was ever brought to justice but what this event did was throw Marcelino into a very important role Marcelino dos Santos was elected to FRELIMO's 3 person ruling system (dos Santos, Uria Simango, and Samora Moises Machel). In the late 1970s, Dos Santos was Minister of Economic Development. He was a member of the FRELIMO Political Bureau in charge of the economy in the early 1980s. From 1987 to 1994, Dos Santos was chairperson of the country's Parliament, the Assembly of the Republic. He represented the left wing of the party and was a Marxist-Leninist. Although the political party may have begun to look into adopting ideas of capitalism Dos Santos was stubborn not accepting it and calling these motions brief. He became head of the most reforming parliament in Mozambican history - which got rid one party state, replacing it with political pluralism, approved a Constitution of the Republic which included guarantees for freedom of assembly, freedom of expression and freedom of the press, and even changed the county's name - from People's Republic to Republic of Mozambique. But still kept his stance on Socialism.

== U.S. relations ==
Marcelino dos Santos says "Although it took some time for our views to be shared by the U.S., I think they are closer than in the past and sufficiently near to enable us to take strong steps forwards in order to bring about peace and promote economic and social development."[12]

== End of life ==
July 1, 1970, Marcelino was invited to the Vatican by Pope Paul VI where he was given a copy of the papal encyclical Populorum Progressio on the problems of the underdeveloped world. The next year he received the Lenin Centenary Medal. The war with RENAMO (Resistência Nacional Moçambicana Party) had finally wrapped up in 1992 when FRELIMO and RENAMO signed a treaty but the expenses made the country one of the poorest ones. He was declared a national hero in 2015 by Mozambicans, and died on February 11, 2020. "Therefore, in life as in death, Marcelino dos Santos, the philosopher's griot, remains an icon in the African's story of toil in the wake of colonialism and neo-colonialism which call for a respective response to collective suffering."

== Sources ==
- Bookrags Encyclopedia of World Biography (accessed December 2007).
- Mozambique News Agency interview (accessed December 2007).
