= Nachingwea, Tanzania =

Town in Lindi Region, Tanzania

Coordinates: 10°22′17″S 38°45′44″E

Nachingwea is a town in the Lindi Region of southern Tanzania. It was the terminus of a railway built for the infamous, ill-fated Tanganyika groundnut scheme. The town is also the site of the tomb of Judy the Dog—the first dog to be given prisoner of war status and recipient of the Dickin Medal. The memorial was put in place by her companion through the war, Frank Williams, who lived in Nachingwea for some time.

== Climate ==
Climate data for Nachingwea
Month	Jan	Feb	Mar	Apr	May	Jun	Jul	Aug	Sep	Oct	Nov	Dec	Year
Mean daily maximum °C (°F)	31 (88)	32 (89)	31 (88)	30 (86)	29 (84)	28 (83)	28 (83)	30 (86)	31 (88)	33 (91)	33 (92)	33 (91)	31 (87)
Mean daily minimum °C (°F)	22 (71)	21 (70)	21 (69)	20 (68)	18 (64)	16 (60)	15 (59)	16 (61)	18 (64)	19 (66)	21 (69)	22 (71)	19 (66)
Average precipitation mm (inches)	160 (6.4)	210 (8.2)	160 (6.4)	130 (5.3)	23 (0.9)	2.5 (0.1)	2.5 (0.1)	2.5 (0.1)	5.1 (0.2)	2.5 (0.1)	74 (2.9)	94 (3.7)	870 (34.3)
Source: Weatherbase
