= Emblem of Mozambique =

- Armiger: Republic of Mozambique
- Adopted: June 25, 1975; 50 years ago (original version); November 30, 1990; 35 years ago (current version)
- Motto: República de Moçambique "Republic of Mozambique"

The national emblem of Mozambique shows a gearwheel bordered by corn stalks and sugarcane. In the middle, there is a red sun over a map of the country in green, blue waves, an AK-47 crossed with a hoe, and a book. The wreath is tied to a ribbon bearing the name of the country. The emblem is rendered in a socialist heraldry style similar to those used by the republics of the Soviet Union.

This emblem was adopted on June 25, 1975 when the country declared its independence of Portugal as a communist state. Since 1990, the emblem is described in the Constitution of the Republic of Mozambique Article 194, which states the design and meaning of the motif.

== Description ==
As described in Article 194, the various parts of the emblem each have a special symbolism, including:

- the corn stalk and the sugar cane represent agricultural wealth
- the cogwheel represents labor and industry
- the book represents education
- the hoe for "peasantry and agriculture production"
- the AK-47, with a bayonet attached, for "defense and vigilance"
- the red star represents the spirit of international solidarity of the Mozambican people".
- the red sun symbolizes the building of a new life

From 1975-1982, the map of Mozambique was brown instead of green. Along with this change of colour, the position of the wreath was changed, the text was changed from black to gold, and a gold border was added around the red star.

In 1990, with the implementation of the new constitution, the name of the country was changed from República Popular de Moçambique to República de Moçambique, and the text on the emblem was changed accordingly.

Mozambique's parliamentary opposition would specifically like to see removed the image of the Kalashnikov assault rifle, which symbolizes the nation's struggle for independence, according to press reports.

== Historical coats of arms ==
In 1935, the Portuguese colonies were officially assigned coats of arms that followed a standard design pattern. (Note: published in the Diário do Govêrno)

Early version of coat of arms

Temporary coat of arms representing Portuguese Mozambique at the Portuguese colonial exhibition (1934).

Provisional coat of arms of Portuguese East Africa in the 1930s.

Coat of arms of Portuguese East Africa from May 8, 1935 to June 11, 1951.

Coat of arms of Portuguese East Africa from June 11, 1951 to June 25, 1975.

Lesser coat of arms from May 8, 1935 to June 25, 1975.

Coat of arms of the People's Republic of Mozambique (1975–1982)

Coat of arms of the People's Republic of Mozambique (1982–1990)
