= Lusaka Accord =

1974 treaty between Portugal and FRELIMO

Acordos de Lusaka
- Signed: September 7, 1974
- Location: Lusaka, Zambia
- Signatories: Portugal; FRELIMO
- Languages: English, French, Portuguese

The Lusaka Accord (Portuguese: Acordo de Lusaka) was signed in Lusaka, Zambia, on 7 September 1974, between the Front for the Liberation of Mozambique (FRELIMO) and the Portuguese government that had been installed by the Carnation Revolution in Lisbon. In the agreement, Portugal formally recognized the right for Mozambique to have independence and agreed with FRELIMO the terms of the transfer of power. The agreement established that independence would be proclaimed after a transition period when administration of the country would be shared between the two parties. Mozambique became independent on 25 June 1975.

== See also ==
- Carnation Revolution
- Armed Forces Movement
- Portuguese Colonial War
- Alvor Agreement
