= FRELIMO =

Ruling party of Mozambique since 1975

FRELIMO Party Partido FRELIMO
- Abbreviation: FRELIMO
- Leader: Filipe Nyusi
- Secretary-General: Daniel Francisco Chapo
- Founders: Eduardo Mondlane; Samora Machel
- Founded: 25 June 1962 (64 years, 136 days)
- Merger of: MANU, UDENAMO and UNAMI
- Headquarters: Dar es Salaam (1962–1975) Maputo (1975–present)
- Youth wing: Mozambican Youth Organisation
- Women's wing: Mozambican Women Organisation
- Veterans' group: Association of Combatants of the National Liberation Struggle
- Armed wing: Forças Populares de Libertação de Moçambique (1975–1994)
- Membership (2002): ▲1,400,000
- Ideology: Democratic socialism; Pan-Africanism; African nationalism; Left-wing nationalism; 1977–1989: Communism; Marxism–Leninism
- Political position: Left-wing; 1977–1989: Far-left
- International affiliation: Socialist International; For the Freedom of Nations!
- African affiliation: Former Liberation Movements of Southern Africa
- Colours: Red
- Slogan: "Unity, Criticism, Unity"
- Assembly of the Republic: 171 / 250
- SADC PF: 0 / 5
- Pan-African Parliament: 0 / 5

Party flag
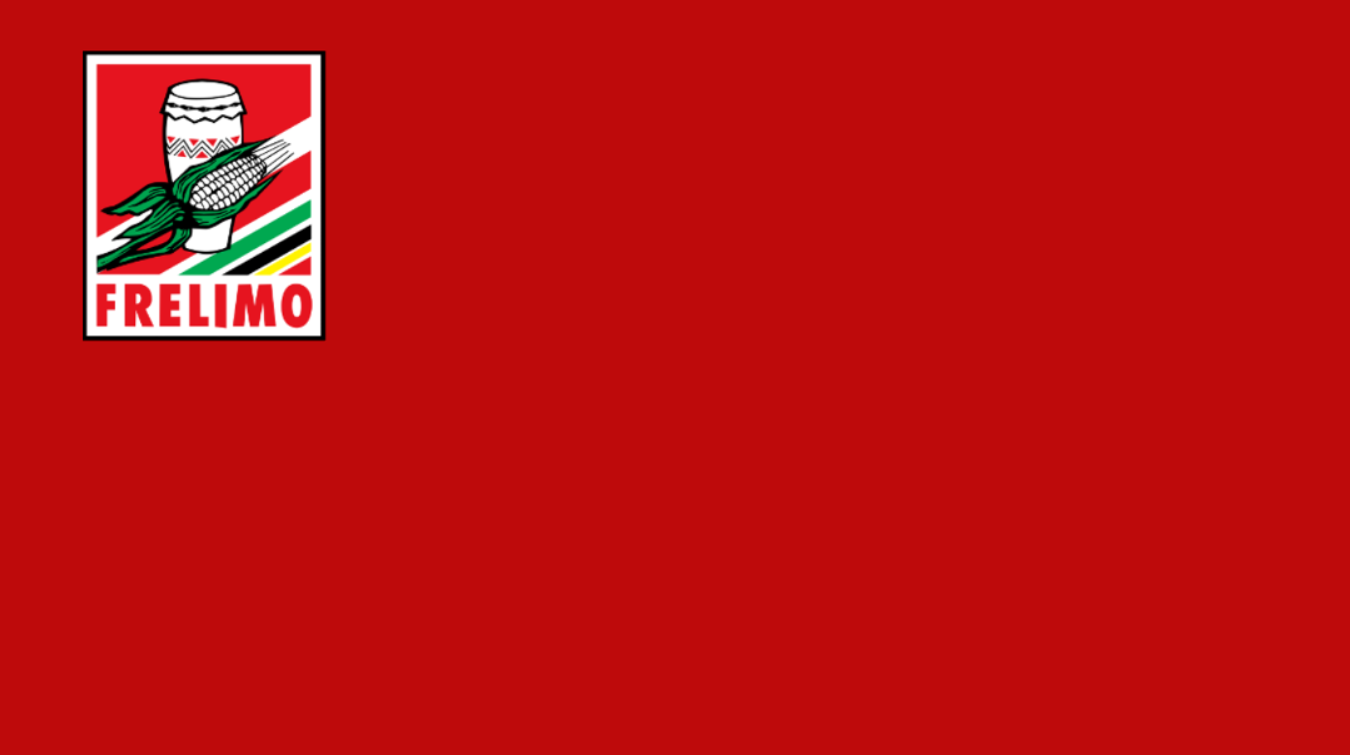

Website
- www.frelimo.org.mz

FRELIMO (Portuguese pronunciation: [fɾɛˈlimu]; from Portuguese: Frente de Libertação de Moçambique, transl. Mozambique Liberation Front (Note: Also translated as the Mozambican Liberation Front or Liberation Front of Mozambique.)) is a democratic socialist political party in Mozambique. It has governed the country since its independence from Portugal in 1975.

Founded in 1962, FRELIMO began as a nationalist movement fighting for the self-determination and independence of Mozambique from Portuguese colonial rule. During its anti-colonial struggle, FRELIMO managed to maintain friendly relations with both the Soviet Union and China, and received military and economic assistance from both. Independence was achieved in June 1975 after the Carnation Revolution in Lisbon the previous year. FRELIMO formally became a political party during its 3rd Party Congress in February 1977, and adopted Marxism–Leninism as its official ideology and FRELIMO Party (Partido FRELIMO) as its official name.

FRELIMO has been the ruling party of Mozambique since then, initially as the sole legal party in a one-party system and later as the democratically elected government in a dominant-party system. FRELIMO fought a protracted civil war from 1976 to 1992 against the anti-communist Mozambican National Resistance or RENAMO. RENAMO received support from the white minority governments of Rhodesia and South Africa. FRELIMO approved a new national constitution in 1990, which ended one-party rule and established a multi-party system. FRELIMO has since become the dominant party in Mozambique and has won a majority of the seats in the Assembly of the Republic in every election since the country's first multi-party election in 1994.

== History ==
=== War of independence (1964–1974) ===
The first flag of FRELIMO used from September 1974 to June 1975

After World War II, while many European nations were granting independence to their colonies, Portugal, under the Estado Novo regime, maintained that Mozambique and other Portuguese possessions were overseas territories of the metropole (mother country). Emigration to the colonies soared. Calls for Mozambican independence developed rapidly, and in 1962 several anti-colonial political groups formed FRELIMO. In September 1964, it initiated an armed campaign against Portuguese colonial rule. Portugal had ruled Mozambique for more than four hundred years; not all Mozambicans desired independence, and fewer still sought change through armed revolution.

FRELIMO was founded in Dar es Salaam, Tanganyika, on 25 June 1962, when three regionally based nationalist organizations: the Mozambican African National Union (MANU), National Democratic Union of Mozambique (UDENAMO), and the National African Union of Independent Mozambique (UNAMI) merged into one broad-based guerrilla movement. Under the leadership of Eduardo Mondlane, who was elected president of the newly formed organization, FRELIMO settled its headquarters in 1963 in Dar es Salaam. Uria Simango was its first vice-president.

The movement could not then be based in Mozambique as the Portuguese opposed nationalist movements and the colony was controlled by the police. (The three founding groups had also operated as exiles.) Tanzania and its president, Julius Nyerere, were sympathetic to the Mozambican nationalist groups. Convinced by recent events, such as the Mueda massacre, that peaceful agitation would not bring about independence, FRELIMO contemplated the possibility of armed struggle from the outset. It launched its first offensive in September 1964.

During the ensuing war of independence, FRELIMO received support from the Soviet Union, China, the Scandinavian countries, and some non-governmental organisations in the West. The mobilization of all, regardless of gender, motivated the initial inclusion of women into the war. Initially women were used to carry goods from Tanzania, but over time they were tasked with "making the first contacts with the population in a new area." Women were expected to engage with the locals and politicize them. This discourse helped legitimize female cadres as real revolutionaries.

Frelimo founded the Women's Detachment, a part of the Department of Defense, as a way to encourage the mobilization of women and enlarge Frelimo's support. Women cadres brought "a new and decisive force to the revolutionary struggle."

Frelimo's initial military operations were in the North of the country; by the late 1960s it had established "liberated zones" in Northern Mozambique in which it, rather than the Portuguese, constituted the civil authority. In administering these zones, FRELIMO worked to improve the lot of the peasantry in order to receive their support. As liberated areas grew, colonial governmental structures were replaced, as Frelimo activists and local chiefs assumed roles of authority. Traditional leaders were accustomed to controlling "the productive and reproductive capacity of women." They "rejected women's rights to participate in armed struggle and defended the bride price system, child marriage and polygamy." These traditional practices "were all viewed as incompatible with the tenets of revolutionary society." Over time, traditional power structures were delegitimized by their association with Portuguese colonization and their inability to accommodate key components of revolutionary ideology. Frelimo encouraged the creation of collectives and greatly increased peasant access to education and healthcare. Often FRELIMO soldiers were assigned to medical assistance projects.

Its members' practical experiences in the liberated zones resulted in the FRELIMO leadership increasingly moving towards a Marxist policy. FRELIMO came to regard economic exploitation by Western capital as the principal enemy of the common Mozambican people, not the Portuguese as such, and not Europeans in general. Although it was an African nationalist party, it adopted a non-racial stance. Numerous white people were members.

The war of liberation was viewed as a rejection of "obstructionist, traditional-feudal and capitalist practices." The transformation of "social and economic relations" had significant implications for women. Women's liberation was "not an act of charity," but rather "a fundamental necessity for the revolution, the guarantee of its continuity and the precondition to its victory." This perspective recognizes the immense labor force that women constitute. Frelimo acknowledged that women's involvement in the formal economy would result in an economically stronger Mozambique. The population was encouraged to view women's emancipation as vital to the amelioration of Mozambique's society.

The early years of the party, during which its Marxist direction evolved, were times of internal turmoil. Mondlane, along with Marcelino dos Santos, Samora Machel, Joaquim Chissano and a majority of the Party's Central Committee promoted the struggle not just for independence but to create a socialist society. The 2nd Party Congress, held in July 1968, approved the socialist goals. Mondlane was reelected party President and Uria Simango was re-elected vice-president.

After Mondlane's assassination in February 1969, Uria Simango took over the leadership, but his presidency was disputed. In April 1969, leadership was assumed by a triumvirate, with Machel and Marcelino dos Santos supplementing Simango. After several months, in November 1969, Machel and dos Santos ousted Simango from FRELIMO. Simango left FRELIMO and joined the small Revolutionary Committee of Mozambique (COREMO) liberation movement.

FRELIMO established some "liberated" zones (countryside zones with native rural populations controlled by FRELIMO guerrillas) in Northern Mozambique. The movement grew in strength during the ensuing decade. As FRELIMO's political campaign gained coherence, its forces advanced militarily, controlling one-third of the area of Mozambique by 1969, mostly in the northern and central provinces. It was not able to gain control of the cities located inside the "liberated" zones but established itself firmly in the rural regions.

In 1970 the guerrilla movement suffered heavy losses as Portugal launched its ambitious Gordian Knot Operation (Operação Nó Górdio), which was masterminded by General Kaúlza de Arriaga of the Portuguese Army. By the early 1970s, FRELIMO's 7,000-strong guerrilla force had opened new fronts in central and northern Mozambique.

The April 1974 "Carnation Revolution" in Portugal overthrew the Portuguese Estado Novo regime, and the country turned against supporting the long and draining colonial war in Mozambique, Angola and Guinea-Bissau. Portugal and FRELIMO negotiated Mozambique's independence, which resulted in a transitional government until official independence from Portugal in June 1975.

FRELIMO established a one-party state based on socialist principles, with Samora Machel re-elected as President of FRELIMO and subsequently the First President of the People's Republic of Mozambique. The new government first received diplomatic recognition, economic and military support from Cuba and the Socialist Bloc countries. Marcelino dos Santos became vice-president of FRELIMO and the central committee was expanded.

At the same time FRELIMO had to deal with various small political parties that sprung up and were now contesting for control of Mozambique with FRELIMO along with the reaction of white settlers. Prominent groups included FICO ("I stay" in Portuguese) and the "Dragons of Death" which directly clashed with FRELIMO. Government forces moved in and quickly smashed these movements and arrested various FRELIMO dissidents and Portuguese collaborators who were involved in FICO, the Dragons and other political entities that conspired or aligned against FRELIMO. These included prominent dissidents such as Uria Simango, his wife Celina, Paulo Gumane, Lazaro Nkavandame and Adelino Gwambe.

=== Marxist–Leninist period (1975–1989) ===
FRELIMO 3rd Party Congress poster (1977)

Mozambique's national anthem from 1975 to 1992 was "Viva, Viva a FRELIMO" (English: "Long Live FRELIMO").

Immediately after independence, Mozambique and FRELIMO faced extraordinarily tough circumstances. The country was bankrupt with almost all of its skilled workforce fleeing or already fled, a 95% illiteracy rate and a brewing counter-revolutionary movement known as the "Mozambique National Resistance" (RENAMO) was beginning its first strikes against key government infrastructure with the assistance of Ian Smith's Rhodesia. As the RENAMO movement grew in strength, FRELIMO and RENAMO began clashing directly in what would quickly turn into the deadly Mozambican Civil War which did not end until 1992.

Large steps had already been taken towards the construction of a Mozambican socialist society by time of the 3rd Party Congress in February 1977, including the nationalisation of the land, many agricultural, industrial and commercial enterprises, rented housing, the banks, health and education.

FRELIMO transformed itself into a Marxist–Leninist vanguard party of the worker-peasant alliance at the congress. The congress laid down firmly that the political and economic guidelines for the development of the economy and the society would be for the benefit of all Mozambicans. FRELIMO was also restructured extensively, the central committee expanding to over 200 members and the transformation of FRELIMO from a front into a formal political party, adopting the name "Partido FRELIMO" (FRELIMO Party).

FRELIMO began extensive programs for economic development, healthcare and education. Healthcare and Education became free and universal to all Mozambicans and the government begun a mass program of immunisations which was praised by the World Health Organization (WHO) as one of the most successful ever initiated in Africa. The scheme reached over 90% of the Mozambican Population in the first five years and led to a 20% drop in infant mortality rates. Illiteracy rates dropped from 95% in 1975 to 73% in 1978. Those who were previously denied access to education because of class, gender, or race were exposed to education. Frelimo's dedication to accessible education had long-lasting consequences as previously marginalized groups, such as women, were able to engage intellectually and be involved in formal political and economic structures for the first time.

Despite the difficult situation and economic chaos the Mozambican economy grew appreciably from the period of 1977–1983.

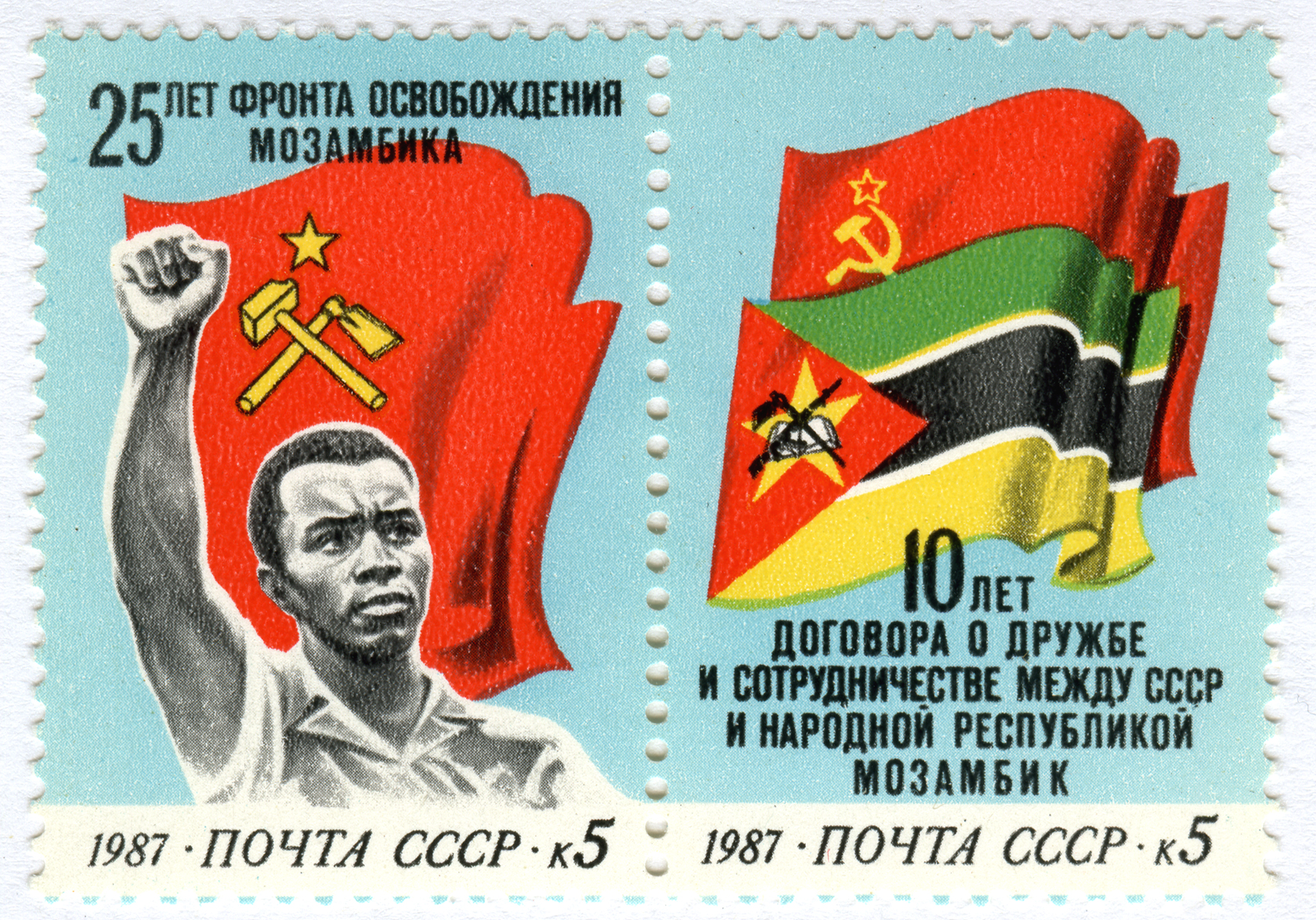
1987 Soviet stamps commemorating 25 years since the founding of FRELIMO and 10 years of USSR-Mozambique relations

However, some serious setbacks occurred, with particular force in the years 1982–1984. Neighbouring states, firstly Rhodesia and then South Africa, made direct armed incursions and promoted the growing RENAMO insurgency which continued to carry out economic sabotage and terrorism against the population. Natural disasters compounded the already devastating situation, with large scale floods in some regions from Tropical Storm Domoina in 1984, followed by extensive droughts.

Some of FRELIMO's more ambitious policies also caused further stress to the economy. Particularly FRELIMO's agricultural policy from 1977–1983 which placed heavy emphasis on state farms and neglected smaller peasant and community farms caused discontent among many peasant farmers and led to a reduction in production. At the 4th Party Congress in 1984 FRELIMO acknowledged its mistakes in the economic field and adopted a new set of directives and plans, reversing their previous positions and promoting more peasant and communal based farming projects over the larger state farms, many of which were either dismantled or shrunk.

As the war with RENAMO intensified much of the improvements made to healthcare, education and basic infrastructure by FRELIMO were wiped out. Agriculture fell into disarray as farms were burnt and farmers fled into the cities for safety, industrial production slowed as many workers were conscripted into battle against RENAMO and frequent raids against key roads and railways caused economic chaos across the country. FRELIMO's focus rapidly shifted from socialist construction to maintaining a basic level of infrastructure and protecting the towns and cities as best they could. Despite small scale reforms in the party and state and the growing war Machel continued to maintain a hardline Marxist–Leninist stance and refused to negotiate with RENAMO.

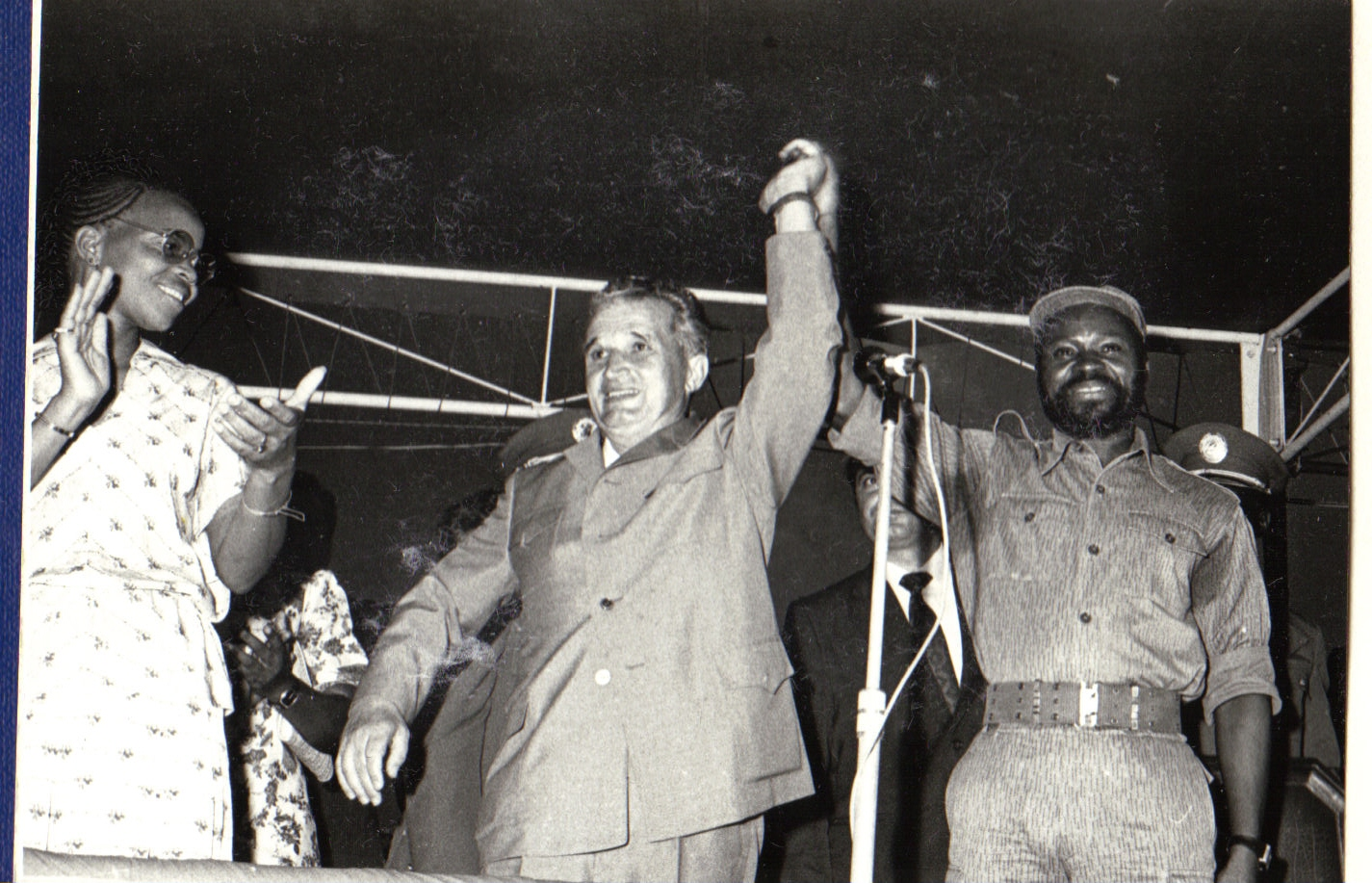
Graça and Samora Machel hosting Romanian Communist leader Nicolae Ceauşescu, Maputo, 1979

In 1986 while returning from a meeting with Zaire and Malawi, President Samora Machel died in a suspicious airplane crash many blamed on the apartheid regime in Pretoria. In the immediate aftermath the Political Bureau of the Central Committee of FRELIMO assumed the duties of President of FRELIMO and President of Mozambique until a successor could be elected. Joaquim Alberto Chissano was elected as the President of FRELIMO and was inaugurated as the Second President of the People's Republic of Mozambique on 6 November 1986. Despite being considered a "Moderate Marxist" Chissano initially maintained Machel's hardline stance against RENAMO but begun economic reforms with the adoption of The World Bank and IMF's "Economic Rehabilitation Program" (ERP) in September 1987. By 1988 Chissano had relented on his hardliner position and begun seeking third party negotiations with RENAMO to end the conflict.

In 1989 at the 5th Party Congress, FRELIMO officially dropped all references to Marxism–Leninism and class struggle from its party directives and documents, and democratic socialism was adopted as the official ideology of FRELIMO while talks continued with RENAMO to broker a ceasefire.

=== Movement towards democratic socialism (1989–2000) ===
Former flag of FRELIMO from 1997 to 2004

With the removal of the final vestiges of Marxism from FRELIMO at the 5th Party Congress, greater economic reform programs commenced with the help of the World Bank, IMF and various international donors. FRELIMO also believed it needed to reduce all traces of socialist influence, this resulted in the removal of hardline Marxists such as Sergio Vieira, Jorge Rebelo and Marcelino dos Santos from positions of power and influence within the party. Additionally FRELIMO began to revise the history of the Mozambican War of Independence to distort it to suit FRELIMO's new, contradictory pro-capitalist beliefs.

In 1990 a revised constitution was adopted which introduced a multi-party system to Mozambique and ended one-party rule. The revisions also removed all references to socialism from the constitution and resulted in the People's Republic of Mozambique being renamed to the Republic of Mozambique.

The civil war conflict continued under a lessened pace until 1992 when the Rome General Peace Accords was signed. United Nations' peacekeeping operation started in 1992 and ended in 1994, helping to end the civil war. With the end of the civil war elections were scheduled for 1994 under the new pluralistic system. FRELIMO and RENAMO campaigned heavily for the elections. FRELIMO ultimately won the elections with 53.3% of the vote with an 88% voter turnout. RENAMO contested the election results and threatened to return to violence, however, under both internal and external pressure RENAMO eventually accepted the results.

In 1992 Frelimo implemented a voluntary quota system like many other "post-conflict countries that had left-leaning parties in power with longstanding commitments to gender equality." Frelimo's quota system requires that 30% of the candidates running for the National Assembly under Frelimo's leadership must be women. There is "equal distribution of women's names (every third name is a woman's) through the candidate lists." Equal distribution on lists are called "zebra lists" and this type of list has proven to be important to the success of quota systems. The adoption of the quota system has resulted in steady growth since its implementation. In 1994 women made up 26% of the national parliament, in 1999 they made up 30%, and in 2004, women won 35%, in 2015 women won 40% of the parliamentary seats. Mozambique is ranked twelfth in the world and fourth in Africa for women's involvement in its national parliament.

Throughout the mid to late 1990s, FRELIMO moved towards democratic socialist views (officially adopting it at the 10th Party Congress), as further liberalisation continued the government received further support and aid from countries such as the United Kingdom and United States. Mozambique became a member of the Commonwealth of Nations, despite not being a former British colony, for its role in ensuring the independence of Zimbabwe in 1980.

In the 1999 general election, Chissano was re-elected as President of Mozambique with 52.3% of the vote, while FRELIMO secured 133 of 250 parliamentary seats.

=== 21st century ===
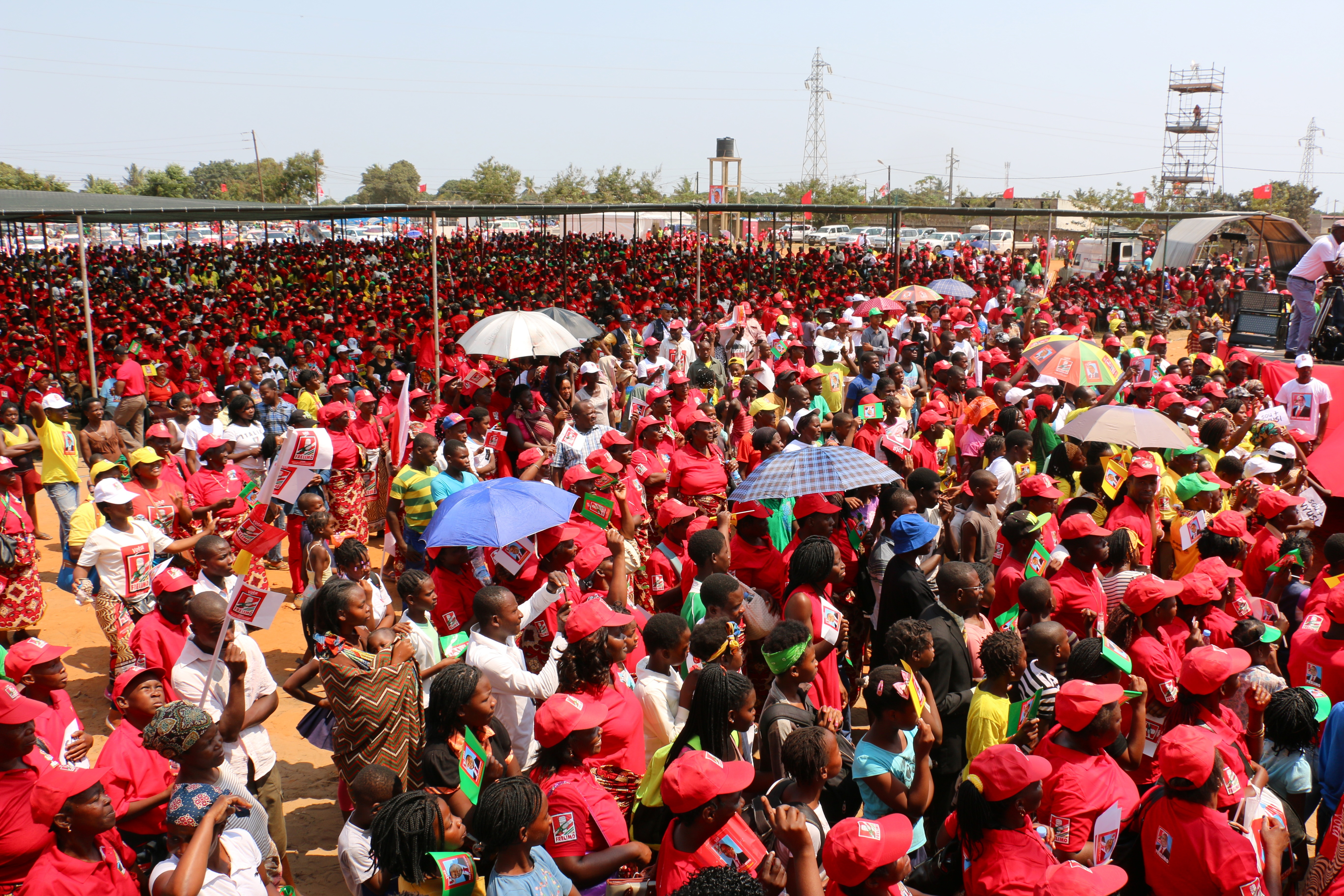
A section of the crowd at its final campaign rally for the 2014 election.

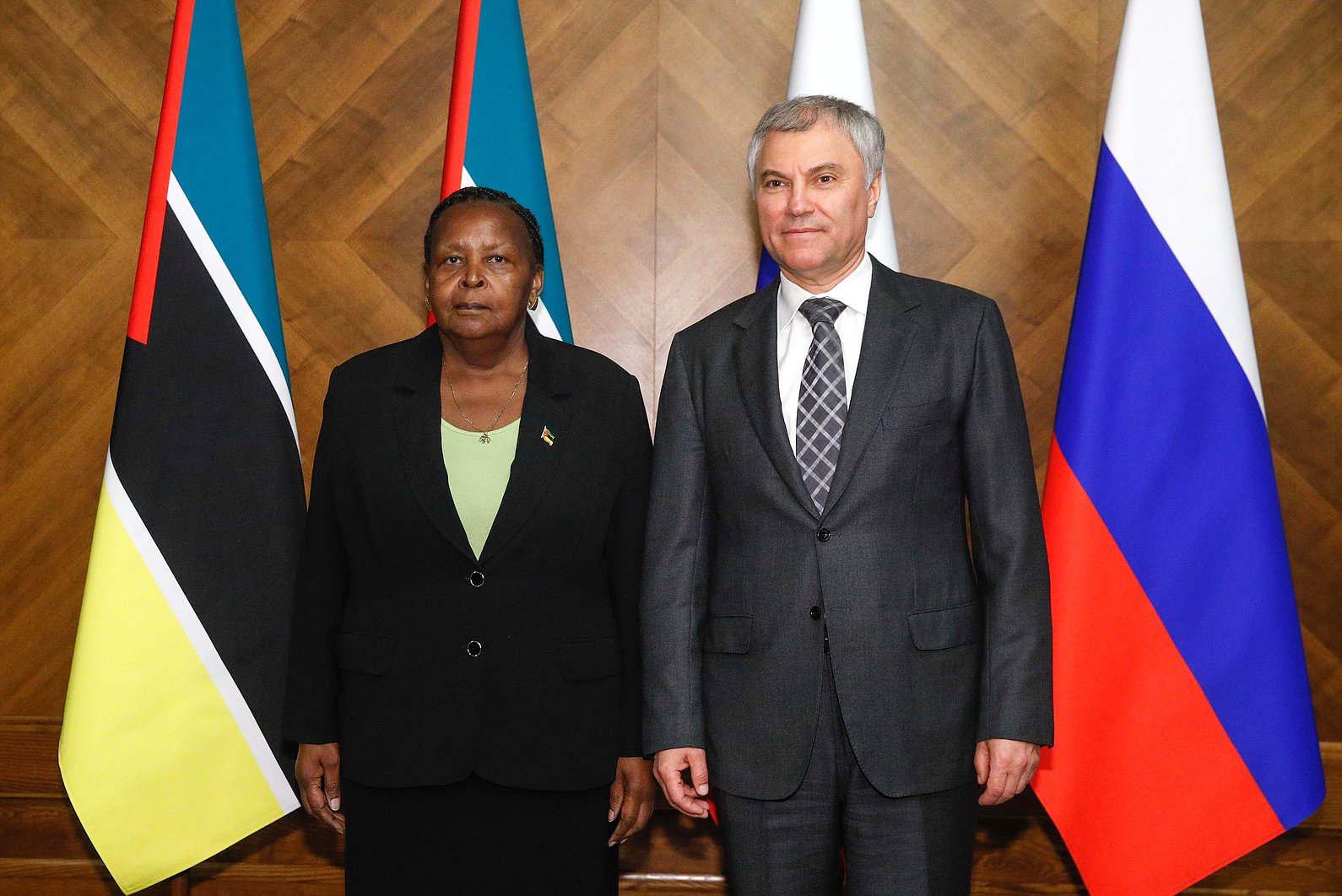
FRELIMO's Secretary for Administration and Finance Esperança Bias with Chairman of the State Duma Vyacheslav Volodin in Moscow, Russia, 26 April 2023

In early 2001 Chissano announced his intention to not stand for the 2004 presidential election, although the constitution permitted him to do so.

In 2002, during its 8th Congress, the party selected Armando Guebuza as its candidate for the presidential election held on 1–2 December 2004. As expected given FRELIMO's majority status, he won, gaining about 60% of the vote. At the legislative elections of the same date, the party won 62.0% of the popular vote and 160 of 250 seats in the national assembly.

RENAMO and some other opposition parties made claims of election fraud and denounced the result. International observers (among others, members of the European Union Election Observation Mission to Mozambique and the Carter Center) supported these claims, criticizing the National Electoral Commission (CNE) for failing to conduct fair and transparent elections. They listed numerous cases of improper conduct by the electoral authorities that benefited FRELIMO. However, the EU observers concluded that the elections shortcomings probably did not affect the presidential election's final result.

== Foreign support ==
FRELIMO has received support from the governments of Tanzania, South Africa, Algeria, Ghana, Zambia, Libya, Sweden, Norway, Denmark, the Netherlands, Bulgaria, Czechoslovakia, Poland, Cuba, China, the Soviet Union, Egypt, SFR Yugoslavia and Somalia.

== Mozambican presidents representing FRELIMO ==
- Samora Machel: 25 June 1975 – 19 October 1986
- Joaquim Chissano: 6 November 1986 – 2 February 2005
- Armando Guebuza: 2 February 2005 – 15 January 2015
- Filipe Nyusi: 15 January 2015 – 15 January 2025
- Daniel Chapo: 15 January 2025 – present

== Other prominent members ==
- José Ibraimo Abudo, justice minister
- Isabel Casimiro, Frelimo MP, sociologist and professor
- Basilio Muhate, Chairman of Frelimo Youth Organization since 2010
- Carmelita Namashulua (born 1962), Minister of Education and Human Development for Mozambique, previously Minister of State Administration and the Public Service of Mozambique (2015–2020)
- Isabel Nkavadeka, politician, elected to Assembly of the Republic of Mozambique in 2009
- Sharfudine Khan, Ambassador of Mozambique (After Liberation)

== Election results ==
=== Presidential elections ===
Election	Party candidate	Votes	%	Result
1994	Joaquim Chissano	2,633,740	53.30%	Elected ✓
1999	Joaquim Chissano	2,339,848	52.30%	Elected ✓
2004	Armando Guebuza	2,004,226	63.74%	Elected ✓
2009	Armando Guebuza	2,974,627	75.01%	Elected ✓
2014	Filipe Nyusi	2,778,497	57.03%	Elected ✓
2019	Filipe Nyusi	4,639,172	73.46%	Elected ✓
2024	Daniel Chapo	4,416,306	65.17%	Elected ✓

=== Assembly elections ===
Election	Party leader	Votes	%	Seats	+/−	Position	Result
1977	Samora Machel			210 / 210	New	▲1st	Sole legal party
1986	Joaquim Chissano			249 / 259	▲39	1st	Sole legal party
1994	Joaquim Chissano	2,115,793	44.3%	129 / 250	▼120	1st	Majority government
1999	Joaquim Chissano	2,008,165	48.5%	133 / 250	▲4	1st	Majority government
2004	Armando Guebuza	1,889,054	62.0%	160 / 250	▲27	1st	Majority government
2009	Armando Guebuza	2,907,335	74.7%	191 / 250	▲31	1st	Supermajority government
2014	Filipe Nyusi	2,575,995	55.9%	144 / 250	▼47	1st	Majority government
2019	Filipe Nyusi	4,323,298	71.3%	184 / 250	▲40	1st	Supermajority government
2024	Filipe Nyusi	4,910,858	71.4%	171 / 250	▼13	1st	Supermajority government

== See also ==
- African independence movements
