= List of bridges in Mozambique =

== Major bridges ==
This table presents a non-exhaustive list of the road and railway bridges with spans greater than 100 metres (328 ft) or total lengths longer than 500 metres (1,640 ft).

	Name	Span	Length	Type	Carries Crosses	Opened	Location	Province	Ref.
1	Maputo–Katembe bridge	680 m (2,230 ft)	3,041 m (9,977 ft)	Suspension; Steel box girder, concrete pylons	Road bridge Maputo Bay; Estuário do Espírito Santo	2018	Maputo–Katembe; 25°58′22.3″S 32°33′26.9″E	Maputo	
2	Save River Bridge	210 m (690 ft)(x3)	870 m (2,850 ft)	Suspension; 4 concrete pylons, concrete girders deck 100+3x210+100	N1 National road Save River	1962	Save–Bobo; 21°08′10.5″S 34°33′57.7″E	Sofala; Inhambane	
3	Samora Machel Bridge	180 m (590 ft)(x3)	720 m (2,360 ft)	Suspension; 4 concrete pylons, concrete girders deck 90+3x180+90	N7 National road Zambezi	1973	Tete; 16°9′17.5″S 33°35′37.7″E	Tete	
4	Armando Emilio Guebuza Bridge	137 m (449 ft)(x4)	2,376 m (7,795 ft)	Box girder Prestressed concrete 80+4x137+80	N1 National road Zambezi	2009	Caia–Chimuara; 17°48′28.6″S 35°23′51.8″E	Sofala; Zambezia	
5	Kassuende Bridge	135 m (443 ft)(x3)	1,586 m (5,203 ft)	Box girder Prestressed concrete	N103 National road Zambezi	2014	Tete; 16°11′32.4″S 33°37′06.3″E	Tete	
6	Xai-Xai Bridge	120 m (390 ft)		Cable-stayed; Composite steel/concrete deck, steel pylons	N1 National road Limpopo River	1964	Xai-Xai; 25°01′36.6″S 33°37′54.7″E	Gaza	
7	New Save River Bridge	120 m (390 ft)	1,009 m (3,310 ft)	Box girder Prestressed concrete	N1 National road Save River	2022	Save–Bobo; 21°08′10.2″S 34°34′04.8″E	Sofala; Inhambane	
8	Dona Ana Bridge	80 m (260 ft)(x33)	3,677 m (12,064 ft)	Truss; Steel	Zambezi	1935	Mutarara–Vila de Sena; 17°26′19.8″S 35°3′48.8″E	Tete; Sofala	
9	Gorongosa Bridge			Arch; Concrete deck arch	N1 National road Pungwe River		Gorongosa District–Nhamatanda District; 18°59′39.7″S 34°05′07.5″E	Sofala	

== See also ==
- Transport in Mozambique
- Mozambique Ports and Railways
- History of rail transport in Mozambique
- Geography of Mozambique
- List of rivers of Mozambique
- List of crossings of the Zambezi River
