= Operation Abanadela =

- Part of Mozambican War of Independence
- Operation Abanadela (Mozambique)
Date	20–30 July 1970
Location	Cahora Bassa, Mozambique
Result	Portuguese victory

Belligerents
Portugal	(Mozambique) FRELIMO

Commanders and leaders
(Portugal) Kaúlza de Arriaga	(Mozambique) Samora Machel

Units involved
(Portugal) Forças Armadas: Portuguese Army; Portuguese Air Force	Unknown

Strength
Unknown	Unknown

Casualties and losses
Unknown	Unknown

Operation Abanadela was a military operation launched by the Portuguese Armed Forces in Mozambique during the Mozambican War of Independence against FRELIMO guerrillas in July 1970. It designates a set of patrols carried out along the Zambezi River in Mozambique between 20 and 30 July 1970 in order to protect the construction of the Cahora Bassa dam from possible attacks by the guerrillas of FRELIMO and the passage of these to the south towards Tete. The Portuguese patrols were carried out by small groups of soldiers from the Portuguese Marine Corps.
