= Operation Penada =

- Part of Mozambican War of Independence
- Operation Penada (Mozambique)
Date	April 1972
Location	Cahora Bassa, Mozambique
Result	Portuguese victory

Belligerents
Portugal	(Mozambique) FRELIMO

Commanders and leaders
(Portugal) Kaúlza de Arriaga	(Mozambique) Samora Machel

Units involved
(Portugal) Forças Armadas: Portuguese Army; Portuguese Air Force	Unknown

Strength
Unknown	Unknown

Operation Penada was the name of a Portuguese military operation that occurred during the Portuguese Colonial War in Mozambique, in April 1972. The Portuguese 31st Battalion of Hunters took part in the operation, the battalion had been stationed in Furancungo.

The inability of Portuguese forces to control the entry of FRELIMO guerrillas into the surrounding territory of the Cahora Bassa dam, who came via Zambia or Rhodesia, led to increasing pressure on the Portuguese from the Rhodesian Security Forces, who criticised the apathy and lack of information about the enemy's movement. The 31st Parachute Hunters Battalion was launched along the borders of those two countries to counter the incursions by guerrillas. The battalion was supported by air support by helicopters.

Elements of the Rhodesian Security Forces penetrated Mozambique, pursuing guerrillas, while full units were involved in military operations with Portuguese forces, notably by helicopter detachments stationed at Chicoa and Pisteiros.

== Aftermath ==
The Portuguese forces, under the command of General Kaulza de Arriaga, did not adequately respond to the guerrillas and as such were accused by the Rhodesians of being highly inefficient.

The Rhodesian military and government led by Prime Minister, Ian Smith considered that the Portuguese military had a poor intelligence service, which did not allow them to know the movements and the locations of the guerrillas; their troop’s mobility was reduced because of the low number of helicopters that they had available. The use of non-regular African forces, special groups (SGs) and special parachutist groups (GEPs) did not make the most of their characteristics. Finally, the action of the Portuguese military was apathetic, as the Portuguese military was not properly pursuing and destroying guerrilla groups.
