= Kassuende Bridge =

Bridge across the Zambezi River in Mozambique

Kassuende Bridge Ponte Kassuende
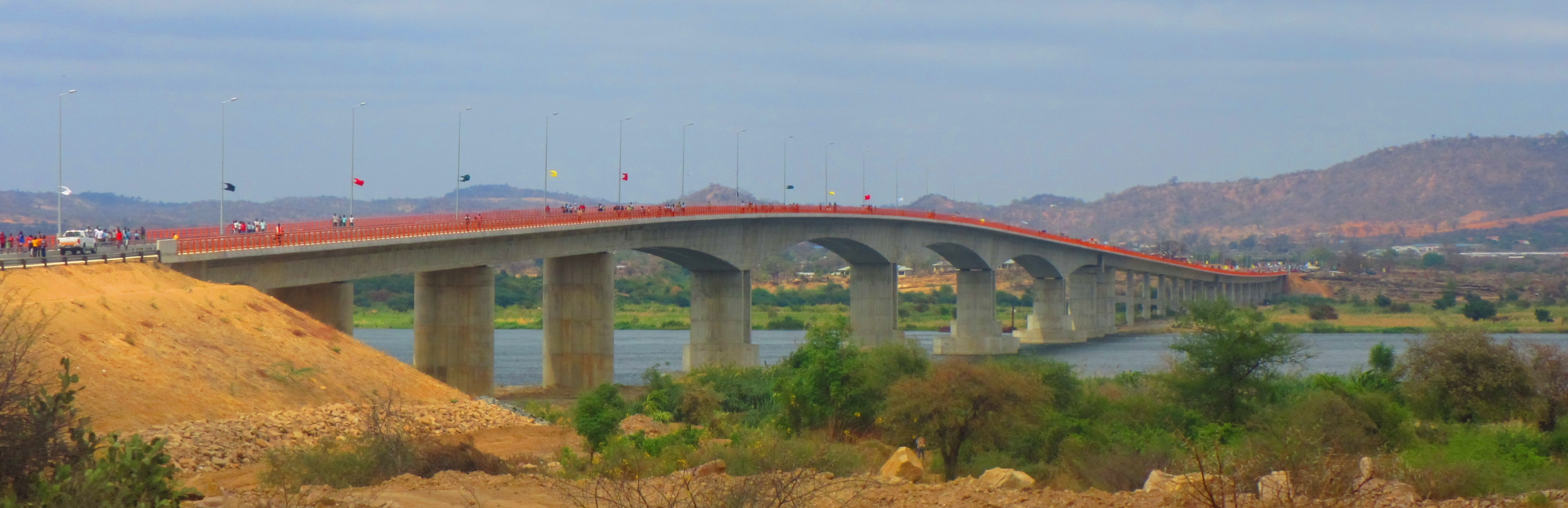
- Coordinates: 16°11′32.42″S 33°37′7.71″E
- Crosses: Zambezi River
- Locale: Benga and Tete in Mozambique
- Official name: Ponte Kassuende
- Preceded by: Samora Machel Bridge
- Followed by: Dona Ana Bridge

Characteristics
- Total length: 715 metres (2,346 ft)
- Width: 14.8 metres (49 ft)

History
- Constructed by: Mota-Engil; Soares da Costa; Opway
- Construction start: April 2011
- Construction end: November 2014
- Construction cost: €105 million (US$133 million)

Location
- Interactive map of Kassuende Bridge

Kassuende Bridge is a bridge in Mozambique across the Zambezi River. It is about 6 kilometres (3.7 mi) downstream from the Samora Machel Bridge. People traveling between Malawi and Zimbabwe do not need to pass through Tete and this helps in reducing the traffic on the current bridge.

== Gallery ==
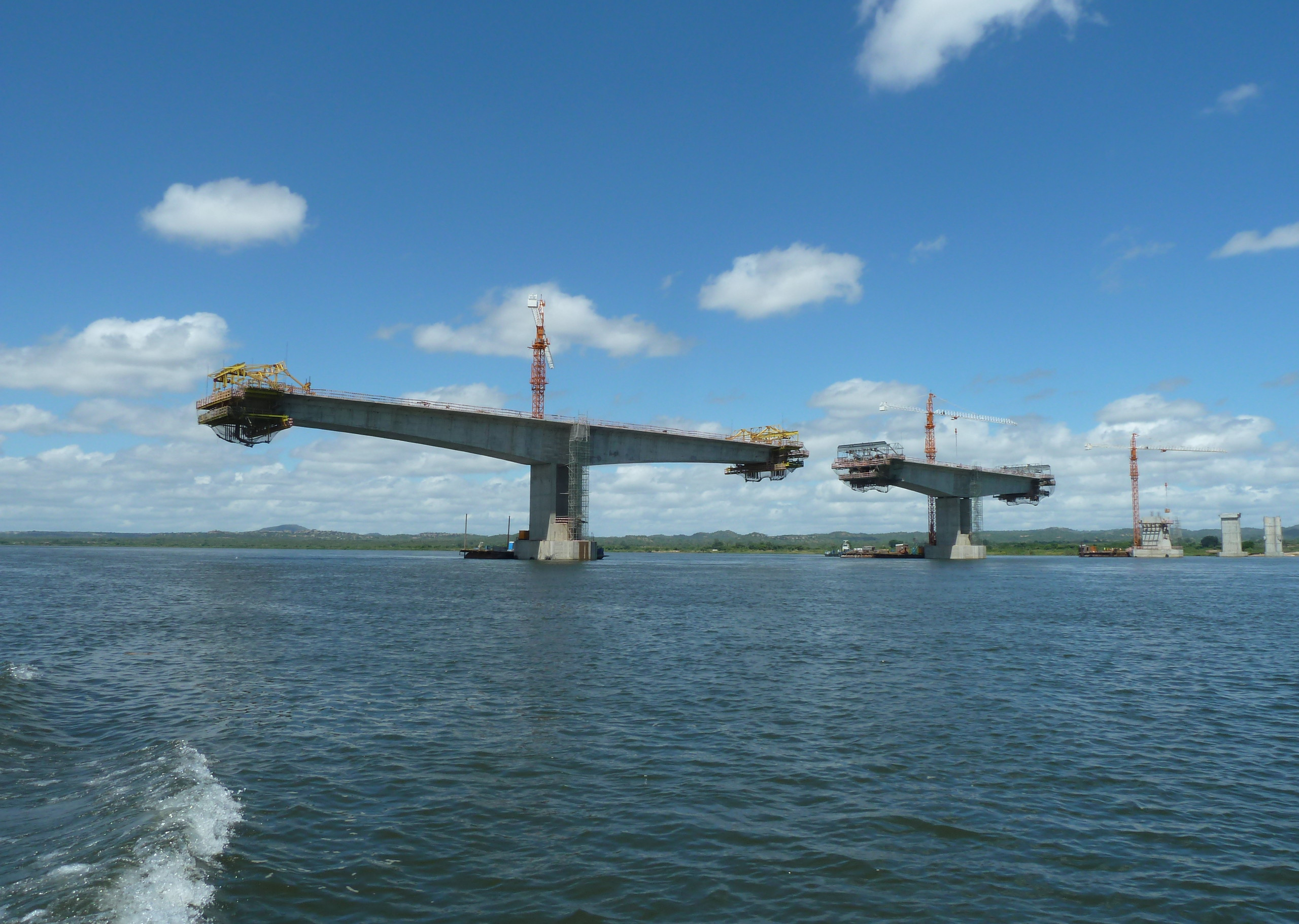

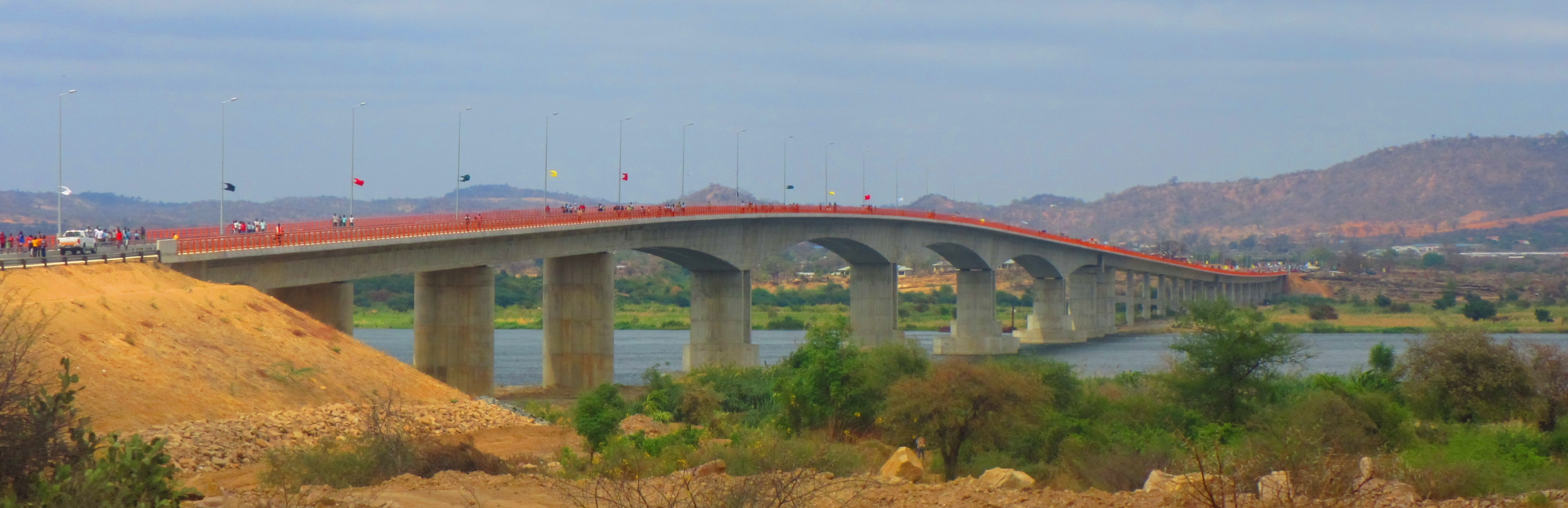

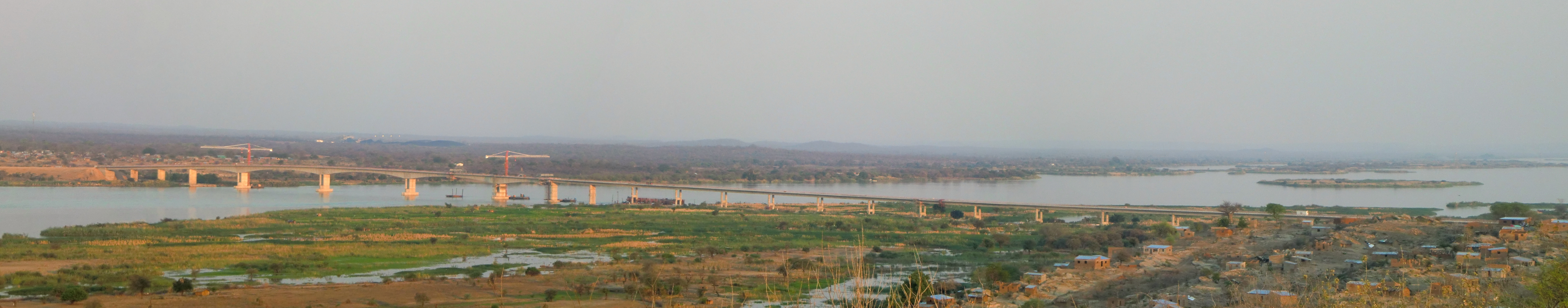

== See also ==
- List of crossings of the Zambezi River
