= António Augusto dos Santos =

Portuguese general

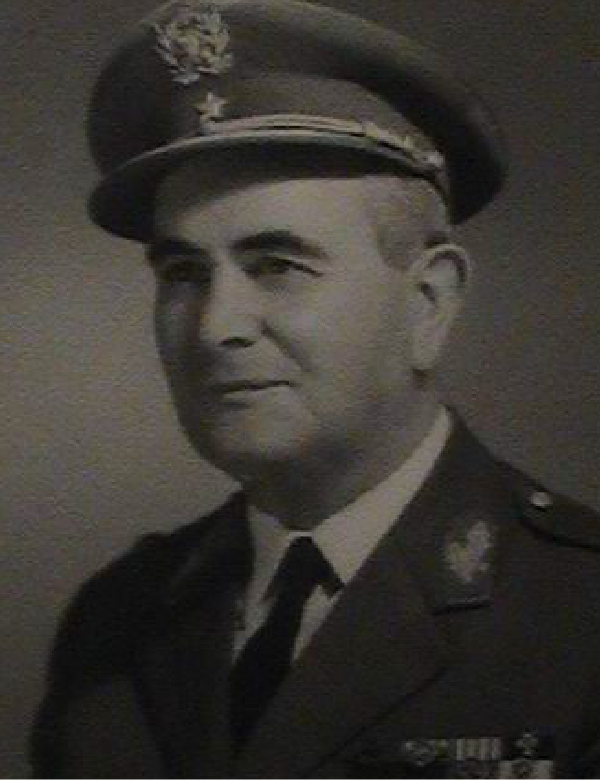
General Augusto dos Santos

António Augusto dos Santos (January 22, 1929 - October 13, 2004) was a Portuguese General and commander of the Portuguese forces in Mozambique from 1964 until he was relieved of command at the end of 1969. On the outbreak of the Mozambican War of Independence in 1964, Augusto dos Santos commanded the Portuguese forces in that Portuguese territory and favored the use of African units trained by Portuguese regulars who fought alongside the Portuguese Army regulars.

General dos Santos believed in a hearts and minds campaign that resulted in the construction of schools and other infrastructure and the training of African Units to build partner capacity (a technique that is used today by the U.S. Military in Africa). He was relieved by General Kaúlza de Arriaga who took over in 1970 and demonstrated poorer success for the Portuguese in the counterinsurgency operations (Gordian Knot Operation) in that the scorched earth policy he pursued turned the people against him. For his efforts in Mozambique, Gen dos Santos was awarded the Military Order of the Tower and Sword. A year later, Augusto dos Santos began serving as the Portuguese Army Chief of Staff (Chefes do Estado-Maior do Exército), a post he held until 1972. He was retired at the time of the military coup in Lisbon on 25 April 1974, which overthrew the Portuguese government headed by Marcelo Caetano and would put to an end the Portuguese Colonial War (1961-1974) shortly thereafter. He refused to participate in the revolution even though he was asked to participate in the revolutionary government. He withdrew from public life and remained a private citizen until his death.
