= Adrian Hastings =

Roman Catholic priest, historian, author (1929–2001)

- Born: 23 June 1929; Kuala Lumpur, Malaya
- Died: 30 May 2001 (aged 71); Leeds, England
- Education: Worcester College, Oxford; Christ's College, Cambridge
- Occupations: Priest; church historian; author
- Organizations: University of Aberdeen; University of Zimbabwe; University of Leeds
- Known for: Book on the "Wiriyamu Massacre"

Adrian Hastings (23 June 1929 – 30 May 2001) was a Roman Catholic priest, historian and author. He wrote a book about the Wiriyamu Massacre during the Mozambican War of Independence and became an influential scholar of Christian history in Africa.

== Early life ==
Hastings, a grandson of George Woodyatt Hastings, was born in Kuala Lumpur, Malaya, but his mother moved to England to bring up the children when he was little more than a baby. He was educated at Douai School (1943–46) and Worcester College, Oxford (1946–49). In his final year at Oxford, Hastings discerned a missionary vocation. He joined the White Fathers but later left the order to become a secular priest in the Diocese of Masaka, Uganda. His sister was the distinguished lecturer, translator, and writer Cecily Hastings, who worked for the publisher Sheed & Ward.

Hastings studied theology at the Collegium Urbanum, the college of the Congregation of Propaganda in Rome. He was ordained in 1955 and awarded a doctorate in 1958. His lifelong association with The Tablet dates from this period. In 1958 he also obtained a teaching degree from Christ's College, Cambridge, and in 1959 he took up his priestly functions in Uganda.

== Ministry ==
In Uganda, Hastings served in pastoral and teaching functions and was charged with interpreting the documents of the Second Vatican Council to priests in Africa. His notes on these documents were later published. He also agitated for a relaxation of the discipline of clerical celibacy in the African context, attributing the low numbers of African clergy to the cultural alienness of this requirement.

In 1966, after bouts of malaria, Hastings returned to England and became active in ecumenical dialogue through the preparatory commission of the Anglican-Roman Catholic International Commission. He was also commissioned by a number of Anglican dioceses in Africa to prepare a report on Christian and customary marriage. From 1972 to 1976 Hastings was on the staff of an ecumenical missionary school, the College of the Ascension in Selly Oak, Birmingham. In 1973 Hastings brought the massacres carried out by the Portuguese army during the Mozambican War of Independence to world attention, first in The Times and later at the United Nations. He created a controversy in 1973 with an article in The Times about the "Wiriyamu Massacre", in the Portuguese-ruled overseas territory of Mozambique, revealing that the Portuguese army had massacred some 400 villagers at the village of Wiriyamu, near Tete, in December 1972. His report was printed a week before the Portuguese prime minister, Marcelo Caetano, was due to visit Britain to celebrate the 600th anniversary of the Anglo-Portuguese alliance.

The Portuguese army at the time denied the massacre in an official investigation but the Portuguese government commissioned another investigation, by Jorge Jardim, who located the former village, photographed the remains and delivered a full report to the Portuguese government proving the existence of the massacre and advising that it be acknowledged and explained. Marcelo Caetano and his ministers discussed the report on 18 August 1973 and instead decided to appoint another military investigation which once again alleged that Wiriyamu did not exist.

Portugal's growing isolation following Hastings's claims has often been cited as a factor that helped to bring about the Carnation Revolution coup which deposed Marcelo Caetano, the leader of the Estado Novo regime that ruled the Portuguese Empire, in 1974.

== Academic career ==
In 1976 Hastings was appointed to a lectureship in the theology faculty of the University of Aberdeen. He was an authority on nations and nationalism. In his 1997 book, The Construction of Nationhood, he traced the origins of European nations back to the Middle Ages, arguing for the centrality of Christianity to European national identities. According to Hastings, the biblical idea of the ancient Israelite polity, with its fusion of land, people and religious polity... was almost monolithically national" and spread through Europe.

From 1982 to 1985, he was Professor of Religious Studies at the University of Zimbabwe. From 1985 to his retirement in 1996 he was Professor of Theology at the University of Leeds and he was involved in the Leeds University Centre for African Studies. From 1985 to 2000 he edited the Journal of Religion in Africa. Later in life Hastings was active in raising awareness of the atrocities accompanying the break-up of Yugoslavia and the reassertion of Serbian control over Kosovo. He was a founding member of the Alliance to Defend Bosnia-Herzegovina.

== Marriage ==
In 1978, Hastings came to the decision that as a Catholic priest he was free to marry. In 1979, he married Ann Spence without seeking ecclesiastical permission or resigning from the priesthood. This was a clear breach of canon law and he was automatically excommunicated by reason of Canon 2388 of the 1917 Code of Canon Law (in force at that time), although, largely because since leaving Uganda he had not been subject to the oversight of any particular bishop, no official recognition was given of that fact. Notwithstanding this, on occasion he exercised his priestly ministry after his marriage.

== Death ==
Hastings died in Leeds on 30 May 2001, aged 71, and was interred in St Mary's Roman Catholic Church, East Hendred, Oxfordshire. The Adrian Hastings Africa Scholarship Fund was founded in 2001 at the University of Leeds in his honour.

== Works ==
Hastings wrote more than forty books, including:

- Church and Mission in Modern Africa. London: Burns & Oates, 1967.
- A Concise Guide to the Documents of the Second Vatican Council. 2 vols. London: Darton, Longman & Todd, 1968–69.
- Wiriyamu. London: Search Press, 1974. ISBN 0-85532-338-8
- In Filial Disobedience. Great Wakering: Mayhew-McCrimmon, 1978. ISBN 0-85597-249-1
- A History of African Christianity, 1950–1975. Cambridge: Cambridge University Press, 1979. ISBN 0-521-22212-5, ISBN 0-521-29397-9
- A History of English Christianity 1920–1985. London: Collins, 1986. ISBN 0-00-215211-8, ISBN 0-00-627041-7
- The Church in Africa, 1450–1950. Oxford: Clarendon Press, 1994. ISBN 0-19-826399-6
- The Construction of Nationhood: Ethnicity, Religion and Nationalism. Cambridge: Cambridge University Press, 1997. ISBN 0-521-59391-3
