= Wiriyamu Massacre =

The Wiriyamu Massacre or Operation Marosca was a Portuguese military action that took place in the province of Tete, Mozambique. It gained a lot of attention internationally after a supposed massacre of the civilian population took place in Wiriyamu.

In September 2022, Portuguese Prime Minister António Costa called it "an unforgivable act that dishonours Portuguese history".

== Background ==
The Portuguese Overseas War broke out in 1961 in response to challenges to Portuguese rule by African independence movements following the success of Democratic Republic of the Congo obtaining independence from Belgium a year earlier. In 1970, FRELIMO guerillas began operating along the Mozambican section of the Zambezi River. The presence of FRELIMO and other anti-colonial revolutionary guerilla organisations sparked intense and widespread panic among settlers and even natives. In response, the Portuguese Army initiated in 1971 a series of "cleanup" operations along the Zambezi, from Mucanha to Mukumbura to Inhaminga.

== Operation Marosca ==
On 16 December 1972, the Portuguese 6th company of Commandos participated in "Operation Marosca". It took place approximately 25 kilometres south of Tete and followed a Portuguese policy aimed at resettling the local population in organised villages, called Aldeamentos. The establishment of the Aldeamentos was intended to improve the living conditions, security and to bring civilization to the native the population, whilst also reducing FRELIMO’s influence.

Earlier that month, DGS received information that a well known and experienced FRELIMO leader, named Raimundo, was planning to visit the settlement of Wiriyamu. Operation Marosca was then planned to capture him and to eliminate any insurgent that could be with him.

The operation began in the early hours of Saturday, 16 December 1972. According to Alferes Melo, commander of the assault group, his men had encountered light resistance from insurgents and the situation was under control. Nothing else important was reported that day and the soldiers returned to their base.

== Aftermath ==
The Portuguese commander submitted his report on 21 December, stating that 20 insurgents had been killed. This figure was found to be inaccurate, but the matter came to light only a few days later, when a Major was informed by the Governor of Tete, who had received information from a local resident who survived the events at Wiriyamu. According to this account, there had been a reprehensible conduct during the operation and a lot of civilians had been killed.

An initial investigation heard testimonies only from members of the Portuguese 6th company of Commandos, as no members of the native population could be located. It concluded that the events constituted an “unfortunate and commonplace incident of war.", but with no mention of a massacre.

When General Kaúlza de Arriaga arrived in Mozambique to spend Christmas with his soldiers, he was told about this incident. He asked the military officials where "Wiriyamu" was located, but no one knew exactly the answer. Some believed the village did not even exist. The village did not appear in any map of Mozambique. Regardless, Arriaga ordered another investigation to be opened. Ever since he had arrived in Mozambique, there had been eighteen rumours of Portuguese troops committing abuses, and investigations were opened to every single case. Out of eighteen cases, three were proven to be correct, and the soldiers which participated in them were punished. On this new investigation, it was found that a total of 63 people were killed, rather than the 20 reported in the initial account. Regarding the course of the operation, it was argued that, in an area where the population was considered to be entirely under insurgent influence, it was impossible to distinguish between FRELIMO fighters and civilians. It was also revealed that the supposed massacre was actually a fabrication done by the Burgos Fathers. These fathers openly supported FRELIMO and were enemies of Portugal. They were always very quick to criticise the Portuguese authorities for any alleged violation of human rights, yet refrained from condemning atrocities committed by FRELIMO.

The news of this supposed massacre received widespread international attention and condemnation of Portugal, especially following the report of Father Adrian Hastings. He, alongside two Spanish missionary priests claimed the Portuguese had killed 400 civilians. However, it must be noted that it would be impossible for a small settlement like Wiriyamu to have at least 400 people living in it, as that was the equivalent to a small city in the province of Tete. It appears that the 400 number was made up, most likely for dramatic effect. Other sources have claimed that the number of deaths were 150 or even 300. Regardless, the numbers are still too high, considering the event took place in a very small site. Due to this international pressure, Marcello Caetano ordered a third investigation to be opened. The inquiry was done by Brigadier Nunes da Silva and his team. The results were the same, no crime was committed in Wiriaymu.

In a report of Archbishop of Dar es Salaam Laurean Rugambwa, he alleged that the killings were carried out by FRELIMO combatants, not Portuguese forces. In addition, others claimed that the massacres by Portuguese military forces were fabricated to tar the reputation of the Portuguese state abroad. A Portuguese journalist Felícia Cabrita reconstructed the Wiriyamu massacre in detail by interviewing both survivors and former members of the Portuguese Army Commandos, the unit that carried out the massacre. Cabrita's report was published in the Portuguese weekly newspaper Expresso and later in a book containing several of the journalist's articles.
