= List of crossings of the Zambezi River =

This is a list of bridges and other crossings of the Zambezi River. Locations are listed with the left bank (moving downriver) listed first.

== Crossings ==
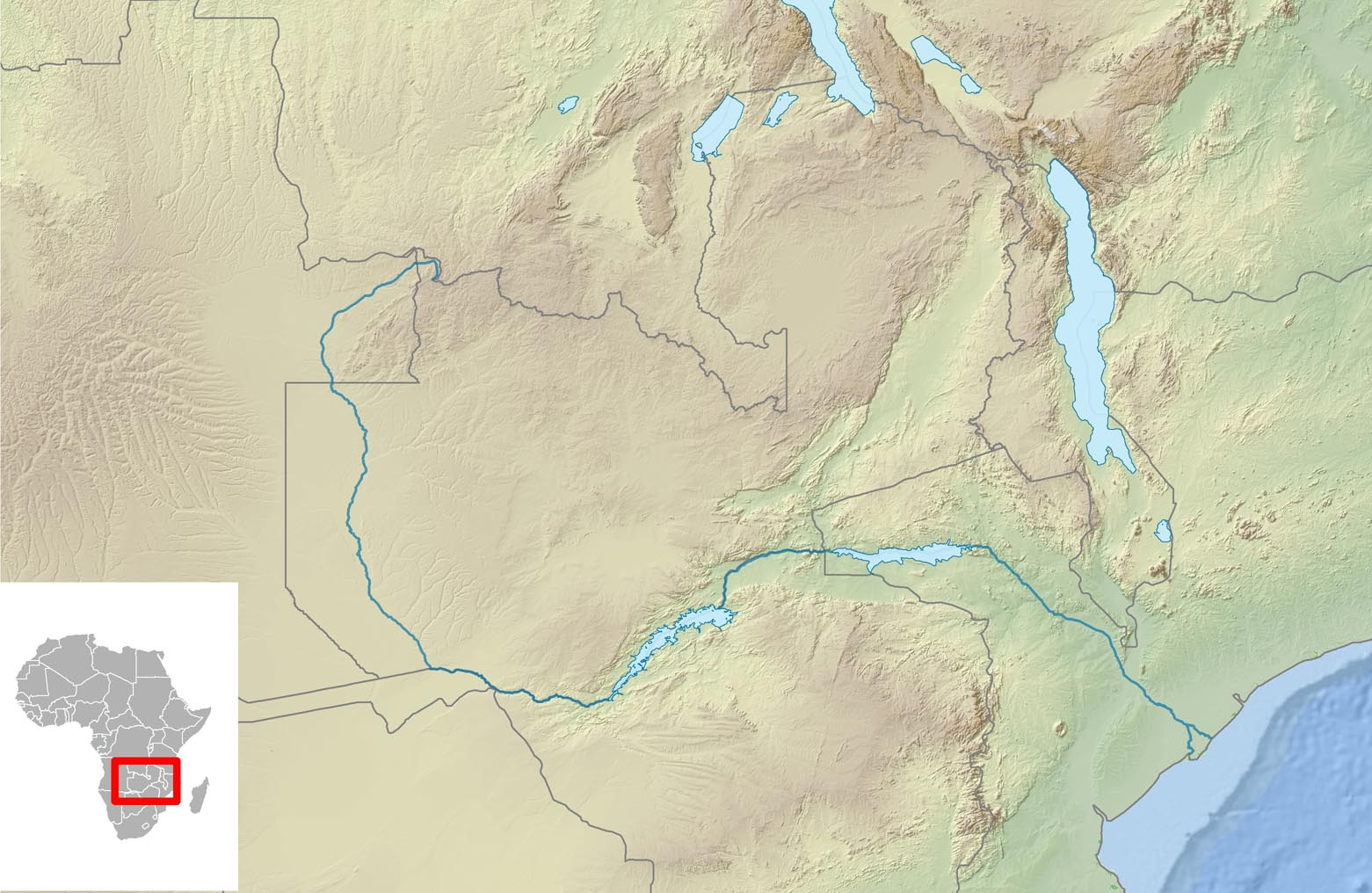
Bridges and other crossings of the Zambezi River

Crossing	Type	Location	Date Opened	State	Coordinates Lat. Long.
=== Angola ===
Cazombo Bridge	road bridge	Cazombo, Moxico Province	reopened 2008	open	11°54′22″S 22°49′52″E
=== Zambia ===
Chinyingi Suspension Bridge	foot bridge	Chinyingi, Western Province	1970s	open	13°21′08″S 23°0′47″E
Barotse Floodplain Causeway	road bridge	Mongu, Western Province	2016	open	15°12′53″S 22°55′34″E
Sioma Bridge	road bridge	Sioma, Western Province	open since April 2016	open	16°40′21″S 23°37′39″E
=== Zambia–Namibia ===
Katima Mulilo Bridge	road bridge	Sesheke, Zambia–Katima Mulilo, Namibia	2004	open	17°28′18″S 24°14′59″E
=== Zambia–Botswana ===
Kazungula Bridge	road and rail bridge	Kazungula, Zambia–Kazungula, Botswana	2021	open	17°47′27″S 25°15′44″E
=== Zambia–Zimbabwe ===
Victoria Falls Bridge	road and rail bridge	Livingstone, Zambia–Victoria Falls, Zimbabwe	1905	open	17°55′42″S 25°51′25″E
Kariba Dam	road over dam	Siavonga, Zambia–Kariba, Zimbabwe	1959	open	16°31′23″S 28°45′41″E
Chirundu Bridge	two road bridges	Chirundu, Zambia–Chirundu, Zimbabwe	1938 and 2002	open	16°02′18″S 28°51′08″E
=== Mozambique ===
Cahora Bassa Dam	road over dam	Tete Province	1974	open	15°35′09″S 32°42′17″E
Samora Machel Bridge	road bridge	Tete–Moatize	1973	open	16°10′55″S 33°35′37″E
Kassuende Bridge	road bridge	Benga–Tete	2014	open	16°11′32″S 33°37′7″E
Dona Ana Bridge	rail bridge	Vila de Sena–Mutarara	1935	open	17°26′21″S 35°03′41″E
Armando Emilio Guebuza Bridge	road bridge	Caia–Chimuara	2009	open	17°48′29″S 35°23′51″E
