= Francisca Chiponda =

Mozambican slave owner

Dona Francisca Josefa de Moura Meneses, known as Francisca Chiponda (circa 1738 - circa 1825), was a powerful mixed-race African slave owner and slave trader in the Tete area of Portuguese Mozambique who was one of those to finance the first Portuguese expedition from Mozambique to Kazembe (now Zambia) in 1790 and the 1798 attempt to cross Africa from east to west.

== Life ==
In the early days of Portuguese Mozambique, most of the Portuguese settlers, who became tenants of parcels of land, married local African women. Upon the death of the tenant the lease was passed to the wife and from her to her first daughter. In this way, some women accumulated considerable wealth, slaves, and power, and were often powerful enough to ignore both the traditional African authorities and the Portuguese law. Such women in the Rios de Sena area of Mozambique, located along the banks of the Zambezi river, were known as Donas (Ladies).

Chiponda means the "lady who tramples everyone with her feet" and Francisca Chiponda got the name due to her ability to get her own way by using armed slaves, making her one of the most powerful of the Donas. Born around 1738, the first of three sisters, descendants of a landowning family, her first husband was João Moreira Pereira, a native of Ovar in Portugal, who had arrived in the colony in 1749, beginning his career as the Captain-General of Rios de Sena and later becoming the Governor-General. He died in 1776, leaving her with considerable debts. The following year she married José Álvares Pereira, who was to become Governor-General of Rios de Sena a decade later but would die shortly after his appointment. In the early 1780s, for unknown reasons, she came into conflict with the then Governor-General, António Manuel de Melo e Castro. She gathered her army and threatened to destroy the Governor's house as well as to raze the then village of Tete.

Even before her first marriage, she was well off as a result of her grandmother's marriage to a Portuguese and she owned a large tract of land (prazo). When she married, her grandfather further offered her land under Portuguese legal arrangements whereby it remained hers and was not considered part of the dowry. Chiponda and her first husband sought to increase their land in several ways. As the Tete residents moved north they were able to obtain concessions to land confiscated from the Jesuit missionaries expelled from Mozambique in 1759, made possible because her husband had been made custodian of the assets of the expelled Jesuits. They also purchased land from the Maravi chiefs, and obtained Maravi land by conquest.

Chiponda supported the expedition of Governor Francisco José de Lacerda e Almeida, which, in 1798, tried to journey to Angola, providing around 300 of her 2000 slaves for the unsuccessful crossing of Africa. Doing this allowed her to negotiate the marriage of her niece to the governor who, however, died during the expedition. It also cost her a lot in terms of dead slaves and others who were captured and had to be ransomed.

Chiponda's daughter died at a young age. As a result, she raised and invested in the descendants of her sister and became the matriarch of the family. By 1798 she had the most opulent house and was the biggest landowner in Tete. These lands produced cereals (corn, millet, rice, and wheat) and cotton, as well as vegetables and fruits, either through production organized by Chiponda or through tributes paid by the Africans who occupied them. However, most of her slaves were engaged in the exploitation of gold. In East Africa, mining work was done by women, with men ensuring the defence of the site. She gave land to relatives, chose their spouses, and organized their lives. By controlling the marriages of her kin, she managed to establish a kinship network with newcomers and with Rios de Sena families, enabling her to expand her alliances and enhance her power until her death, in around 1825. Using African labour, Chiponda and other similar women were associated with local trade and the commercial networks that connected the Indian Ocean to the African interior. She not only continued the trading of her husbands but also enlarged it. Her power depended on the slaves she had and her ability to control them, often using her slaves to seize other people's land.
