= Filipe Samuel Magaia =

Mozambican revolutionary and guerrilla leader (1937–1966)

Filipe Samuel Magaia (7 March 1937 – 10/11 October 1966) was a Mozambican revolutionary and guerrilla leader. He was the Secretary of Defense for the Mozambican FRELIMO organisation during the Mozambican War of Independence. After a number of years fighting, Magaia was assassinated by a renegade FRELIMO soldier who was working for the Portuguese.

Magaia was born in Mocuba, in the Zambezia Province of Mozambique, the son of Samuel Guenguene Magaia, a health practitioner, and his wife Albinic Ana Perreira Magaia. During his years as commander of the FRELIMO forces, Magaia sought assistance from Algeria in training his men. He outlined the strategy of the guerrilla forces as one of the "gradual wearing down, morally, psychologically and materially, of the enemy forces, and of the entire machinery that sustained the colonisation of Mozambique". He commanded forces during the initial attacks at Xai Xai, and later in the provinces of Niassa and Tete, using groups of ten to fifteen soldiers in quick guerrilla raids, advancing south towards Meponda and Mandimba, linking to Tete with the aid of forces from the Republic of Malawi. Enjoying freedom to move in the countryside, Magaia was able to increase the size of his attack forces to 100 soldiers in some cases. On 10 or 11 October 1966, on returning to Tanzania after inspecting the front lines, Magaia was shot dead by Lourenço Matola, a fellow FRELIMO guerrilla who was said to be in the employ of the Portuguese.
