= Chinyingi =

Capuchin mission and hospital in Zambia

Coordinates: 13°21′15.5″S 23°00′38.7″E

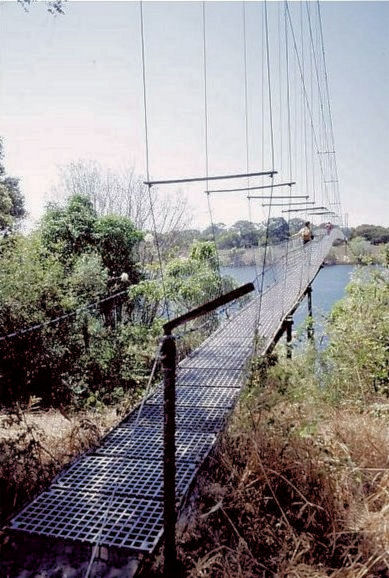
The Chinyingi suspension bridge

Chinyingi is a Capuchin mission and hospital in the sparsely populated North-Western Province of Zambia, on the west bank of the Zambezi River. An estimated 6000 people live within a seven kilometer radius of the Chinyingi mission. The mission's hospital, Chinyingi Mission Hospital, serves the local community with a 52-bed hospital and several health outreach programs, providing everything from first aid to services for people with HIV/AIDS, which affects some 25% of Zambia's population. The mission also operates a school.

In the 1970s, a Capuchin brother named Crispin Valeri constructed a pedestrian bridge over the Zambezi River. Valeri was motivated by the deaths of five people who drowned in the Zambezi River as the tragic result of four people trying to use a dugout canoe to ferry a sick person to the hospital for care. He solicited donations of material from the copper mines of Zambia's Copperbelt, and employed local unskilled labor to construct the bridge, which despite Valeri's lack of training or expertise, proved sturdy and reliable and still spans the river as of 2018. At the time, the bridge Valeri constructed was one of only five crossings along the 2,574 kilometer length of the Zambezi. A pontoon bridge was later constructed underneath it to allow vehicles to cross.

Chinyingi's elevation above sea level is 1,100 meters.

== Chinyingi Mission Hospital redesign ==
As of May 2016, the Chinyingi Mission Hospital was undergoing renovations, with hospital staff consisting only of one nurse. The remainder of the staff had moved elsewhere, looking for employment at rural health outposts spread across the North-Western Province of Zambia or at the Zambezi District Hospital, located across the Zambezi River in the village of Zambezi. The priests of the Chinyingi Mission noted that the redesign and renovation of the hospital was a necessity, as they were unable to find a doctor that wished to practice at the facility. Instead of closing the doors to the hospital permanently, they initiated renovations in order to keep the facility up to high standards, and to provide medical care for the villagers on the western bank of the Zambezi River as Valeri intended by building the suspension bridge.

== See also ==
- List of crossings of the Zambezi River
