= Operation Gordian Knot =

Military operation of the Portuguese Colonial War

- Part of Mozambican War of Independence
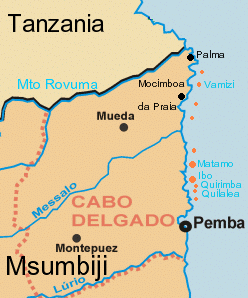
Date	1 July – 6 August 1970
Location	Mozambique
Result	Portuguese victory

Belligerents
Portugal	(Mozambique) FRELIMO

Commanders and leaders
(Portugal) Kaúlza de Arriaga	(Mozambique) Samora Machel (Mozambique) Alberto Chipande

Units involved
(Portugal) Forças Armadas: Portuguese Army; Portuguese Navy; Portuguese Air Force	Forças Populares de Libertação de Moçambique

Strength
34,000–35,000 soldiers	9,000–11,000 guerillas

Casualties and losses
132 killed 82 wounded 15 vehicles destroyed/damaged	651 killed 1,840 captured 61 bases destroyed 165 camps and sanctuaries destroyed
- 4 civilians killed

Operation Gordian Knot (Operação Nó Górdio) was the largest and most expensive Portuguese military campaign in the Portuguese overseas province of Mozambique, East Africa. The operation was carried out in 1970, during the Portuguese Colonial War (1961–1974). The objectives of the campaign were to close down the Mozambique Liberation Front (FRELIMO)'s infiltration routes across the Tanzanian border and to destroy permanent FRELIMO bases inside the liberated zones in Northern Mozambique. Gordian Knot was a seven-month long campaign ultimately employing 35,000 men, and was almost successful since it destroyed most guerrilla camps located inside FRELIMO's liberated zones and captured large numbers of rebels and armaments, forcing FRELIMO to retreat from their bases and outposts in the provinces.

== Background ==
=== Arrival of Brigadier General Kaúlza de Arriaga ===
In March 1970 Brigadier General Kaúlza de Arriaga was appointed commander for Portuguese forces in the Portuguese Overseas Province of Mozambique. He had studied the Mozambican theater from a position on the staff of the Institute of Higher Military Studies in Lisbon and had served as commander of ground forces in Mozambique for eight months prior to assignment as overall commander. He consulted with American General William Westmoreland on American tactics in Vietnam. Arriaga insisted on the deployment of aircraft to support ground operations, particularly helicopter gunships. He initiated large scale "search-and-destroy" missions. He also requested a further increase of troops and materiel. Bolstered with three thousand additional Portuguese soldiers, Arriaga launched the largest offensive campaign of the Portuguese Colonial War - Operation Gordian Knot (Operação Nó Górdio).

== The operation ==
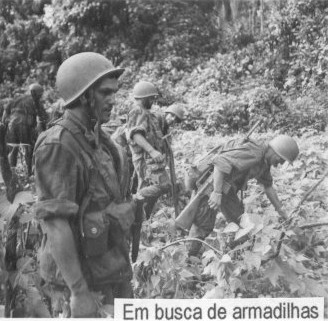
Portuguese soldiers on patrol.

The objectives of the campaign were to seal off the infiltration routes across the Tanzanian border and to destroy permanent guerrilla bases. "Gordian Knot" was a seven-month campaign employing ultimately thirty-five thousand men, and was almost successful. The brunt of the effort was in the Cabo Delgado, in the extreme north of Mozambique on the border with guerrilla sympathizer, Tanzania. Tactics consisted of lightning quick airborne assaults on small camps. Continual artillery and aviation bombardment rained down on larger targets, while bulldozer-guided, motorized armies converged. These tactics were effective and Arriaga pursued the guerrillas relentlessly. However, the exertions of "Gordian Knot" could not be continued indefinitely.

The Portuguese had excellent coordination between light bombers, helicopters and reinforced ground patrols. They used the American tactics of quick airborne (heliborne) assaults supported by heavy aerial bombardments of FRELIMO camps by the Portuguese Air Force (Força Aérea Portuguesa or FAP) to surround and eliminate the guerrillas. These bombardments were accompanied by the use of heavy artillery. The Portuguese also used mounted cavalry units to cover the flanks of patrols and where the terrain was too difficult for motor transport, while units of captured or deserted guerrillas were employed to penetrate their former bases.

However, as the number of guerrillas killed and captured increased, so did the number of Portuguese casualties. The politicians in Lisbon—the metropole—, although dissatisfied with the success of the counterinsurgency until Arriaga's assumption of command, had been content with the relatively low casualty figures. As casualty rates continued to climb during "Gordian Knot", their early pleasure with the improving tactical operations diminished. Political meddling in the conduct of the war occurred with increasing frequency.

Though "Gordian Knot" had been the most successful campaign of the counterinsurgency, it had not delivered the ultimate victory desired by Arriaga - for several reasons. The first, noted above, was political "queasiness" with the increased casualty rates and subsequent meddling in the operation itself. The second was the onset of the rainy season in November which proved to be longer than usual and subsequently gave the guerrillas more than enough time to partially recover. The third was the simple fact that Arriaga had to mass all of the Portuguese forces in Mozambique to pursue the campaign in the extreme northern provinces in the hopes of a relatively quick but decisive victory. FRELIMO realized this and reacted by dispersing into the jungle, prolonging the campaign and trying to consume Portuguese resources. Simultaneously, guerrillas increased operations in other provinces, left sparsely guarded by Portuguese troops, but with no success. A Portuguese communique issued in late January, 1971, acknowledged that, in spite of the massive operation, not all military objectives had been realised.

The Portuguese eventually reported that 651 guerrillas were killed and another 1,840 were captured, for the loss of 132 Portuguese troops. Arriaga claimed that his troops had destroyed 61 guerrilla bases and 165 guerrilla camps, while 40 tons of ammunition had been captured in the first two months of the operation.

== Aftermath ==
Arriaga, whether disillusioned by "Gordian Knot" or restrained by Lisbon due to budgetary issues, shifted from extended conventional sweeps to small unit actions deploying black and white shock troops. By this time, half of the Portuguese troops on the field were conscripted black Africans from Mozambique. By 1972, the situation had deteriorated with the Portuguese forces operating out of traditionally secluded strongholds inside FRELIMO liberated zones and controlled areas. The violence and brutality of Portuguese actions against the population of the countryside were increasing along with various massacres against civilians. The Portuguese stepped up new defensive tactics, herding civilians into villages and trying to ensure the population was not reachable by FRELIMO. The Portuguese regime subsequently changed its message from "destroying FRELIMO" to "bringing the situation under control."

Despite the initial Portuguese military success, the number of monthly casualties never declined to zero. FRELIMO continued to cross the border to maintain links with the local population and opened a new front in the Province of Tete near the Cahora Bassa hydroelectric dam by rerouting their forces through Zambia. As the liberation struggle continued on, the Portuguese regime continued to commit horrific atrocities, the most infamous of which was the massacre at Wiriyamu, a village which had been classified as collaborating with FRELIMO by the PIDE/DGS. The incident itself was not brought to the attention of the rest of the world until nearly a year later, in July 1973, by a Dominican priest who witnessed the massacre. It was at first denied, then contested, investigated and again denied by the Portuguese authorities of the Estado Novo. Though full details of the entire episode are still not known, a large number of innocent civilians were slaughtered by a group of Portuguese soldiers during a planned operation (Operation Marosca) to attack an alleged guerrilla base. The PIDE/DGS agent who guided the soldiers told them explicitly that the orders were to "kill everyone", despite only civilians having been found in the village and there being no signs of FRELIMO activity. This agent, Chico Kavachi, was later murdered before he could be interviewed in an investigation ordered by the Portuguese government after the massacre became public in July 1973. Some historians speculate that the DGS wanted to deliberately create an embarrassment for the government, so as to get rid of Kaúlza de Arriaga, whom they considered an incompetent general.

=== Long-term effect ===
Later counter-claims, probably at the behest of the Portuguese government, have been made in a report of the Archbishop of Dar es Salaam Laureaen Rugambwa that the killings were carried out by FRELIMO combatants, not Portuguese forces. In addition, others claimed that the alleged massacres by Portuguese military forces were fabricated to tar the reputation of the Portuguese state abroad. But the exposure of the Wiriyamu massacre brought with it the exposure of numerous other massacres on a smaller scale and increased worldwide (particularly Third World) condemnation of Portugal. During 1973 and early 1974, the situation continued to worsen for the Portuguese. FRELIMO continued to advance further into Portuguese-controlled territory from fronts in Tete and Cabo Delgado. The civilian authorities in Lisbon, embarrassed by the atrocities and massacres exposed, had lost a great amount of confidence in military solutions and were encouraging the expansion of operations by PIDE. PIDE's paramilitary endeavours were viewed as excessively brutal and counterproductive by the leaders of the military, and disagreement on the proper role of the secret police in combating the insurgency widened the rift between the central government and the military leadership and helped fuel the discontent and disillusionment within the Armed Forces.

When the Movimento das Forças Armadas (MFA) seized control of the government in Lisbon on 25 April 1974, an event known as the Carnation Revolution, the Portuguese position in Mozambique all but collapsed.

General António de Spínola, head of the new government and a former commander of counter-independence forces in other Portuguese territories in Africa, manoeuvred to maintain some control over the destiny of the Mozambican people by calling for a cease-fire and Portuguese sponsored elections. However, FRELIMO, sensing victory, refused to allow Spínola to impose a neocolonialist solution on Mozambique.

FRELIMO announced the opening of a new front in Zambezia and poured guerrillas into the central regions of the country, advancing further south. The Spinola government countered by ordering northern outposts abandoned and the concentration of troops in the southern regions, by handing out arms to rural settlers, and by ordering an increase in bombing attacks on guerrilla-controlled territories. These measures were intended to support the Portuguese position at the negotiating table. However, the Portuguese troops fighting in Mozambique realised that the coup in Lisbon, the change of regime and the opening of negotiations with FRELIMO were a prelude to withdrawal. Instead of engaging FRELIMO, many refused to continue risking their lives and enacted local ceasefires and surrenders. By mid-summer 1974, an undeclared truce prevailed, since the bulk of the Portuguese army would not leave their barracks and refused to fight. On 8 September 1974, an accord was signed formalising the cease-fire. The agreement called for a transitional government with full independence for Mozambique to be granted on 25 June 1975 - the thirteenth anniversary of FRELIMO. The Portuguese Colonial War had ended, but the newly independent territories of Angola and Mozambique would enter a period of chaos and devastating civil wars (Angolan Civil War and Mozambican Civil War) which lasted several decades and claimed millions of lives and refugees.

== See also ==
- Operation Green Sea
- Frente Leste
