= Armando Emilio Guebuza Bridge =

Bridge across the Zambezi River in Mozambique

Armando Emilio Guebuza Bridge Portuguese: Ponte Armando Emílio Guebuza
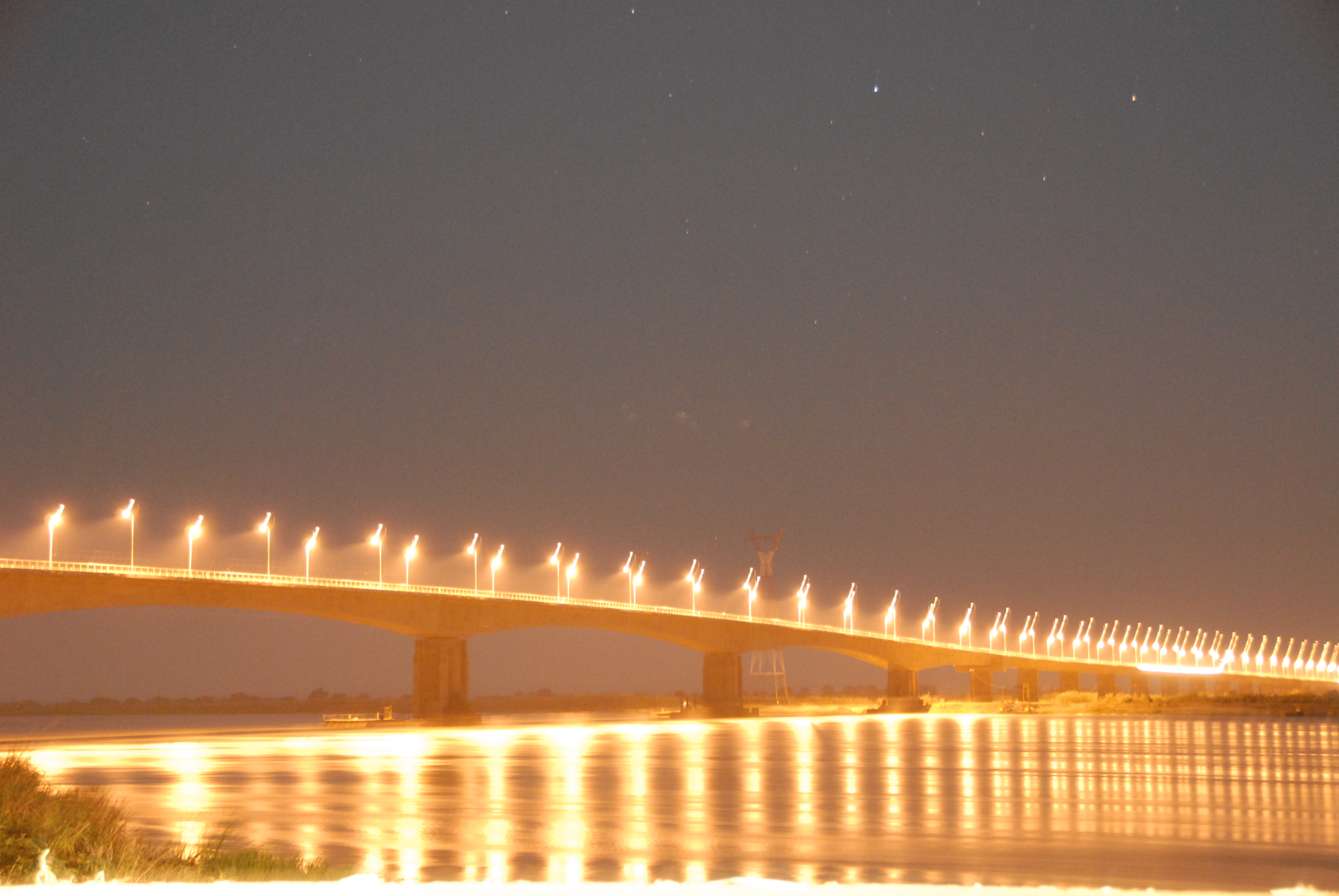
- Coordinates: 17.8081°S 35.3975°E
- Carries: EN1 (2 lanes)
- Crosses: Zambezi River
- Locale: Caia and Chimuara
- Other name: Zambezi River Bridge
- Maintained by: National Road Administration
- Preceded by: Dona Ana Bridge

Characteristics
- Design: Box girder bridge
- Total length: 2,376 metres (7,795 ft)
- Width: 16 metres (52 ft)
- No. of spans: 6

History
- Designer: WSP Global
- Constructed by: Mota-Engil; Soares da Costa
- Construction start: December 2005
- Construction cost: € 66 million
- Inaugurated: 1 August 2009
- Replaces: Ferry service

Statistics
- Toll: US$ 3 (light vehicles); US$ 30 (trucks)

Location
- Interactive map of Armando Emilio Guebuza Bridge

The Armando Emilio Guebuza Bridge is a bridge in Mozambique that crosses the Zambezi River. It connects the provinces of Sofala and Zambezia. It is named after Armando Guebuza, a former President of Mozambique.

== Gallery ==
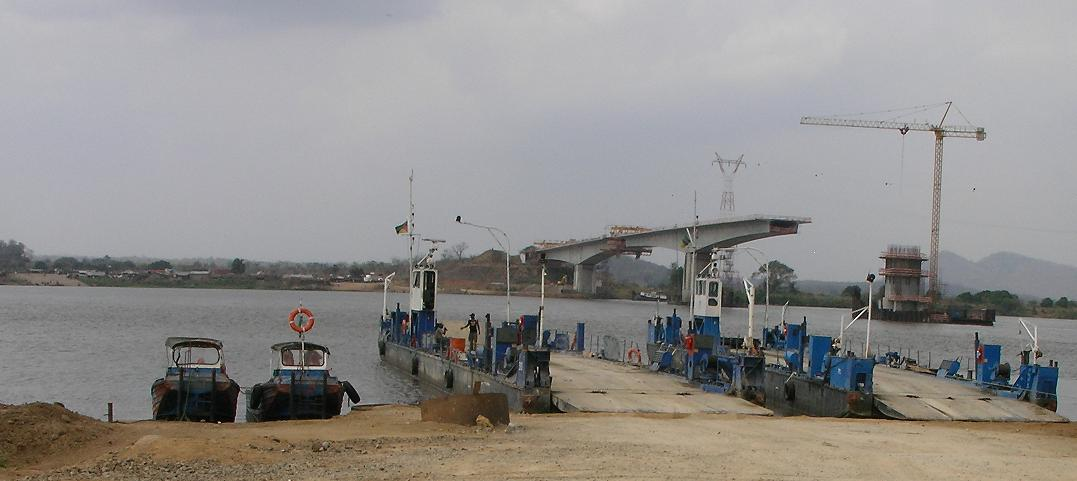
Under construction, with ferry service

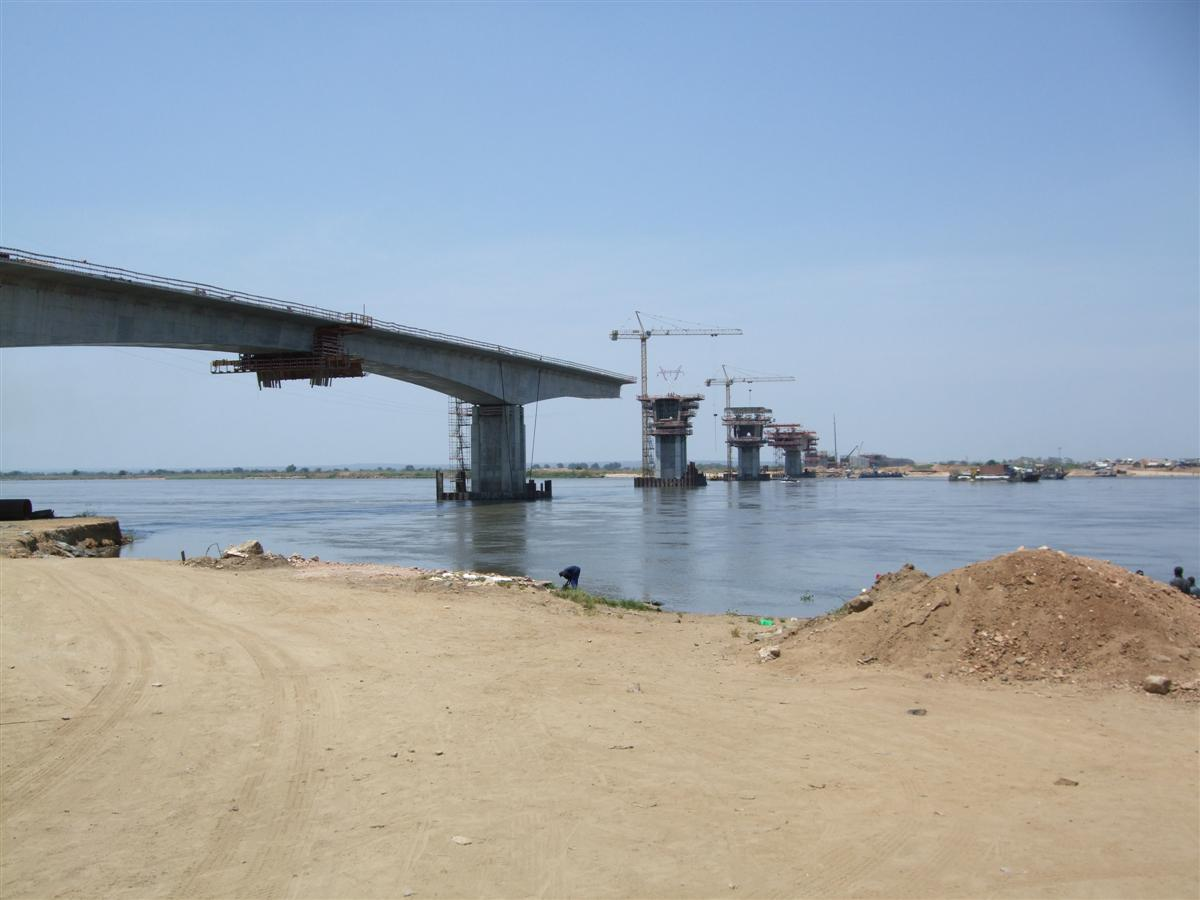
Under construction

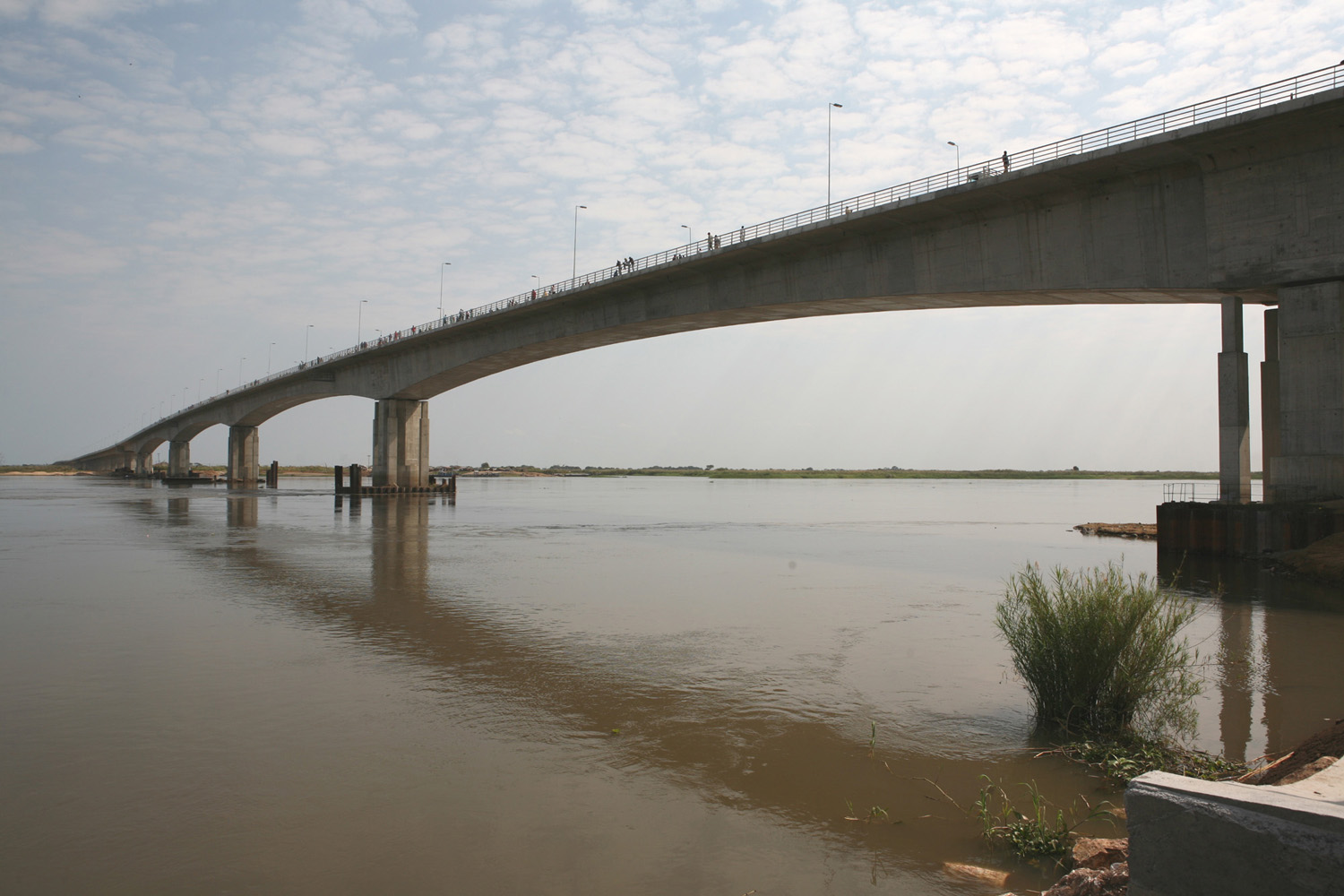
Completed bridge, 2009

== See also ==
- List of longest bridges in the world
- List of crossings of the Zambezi River
