= Caia, Mozambique =

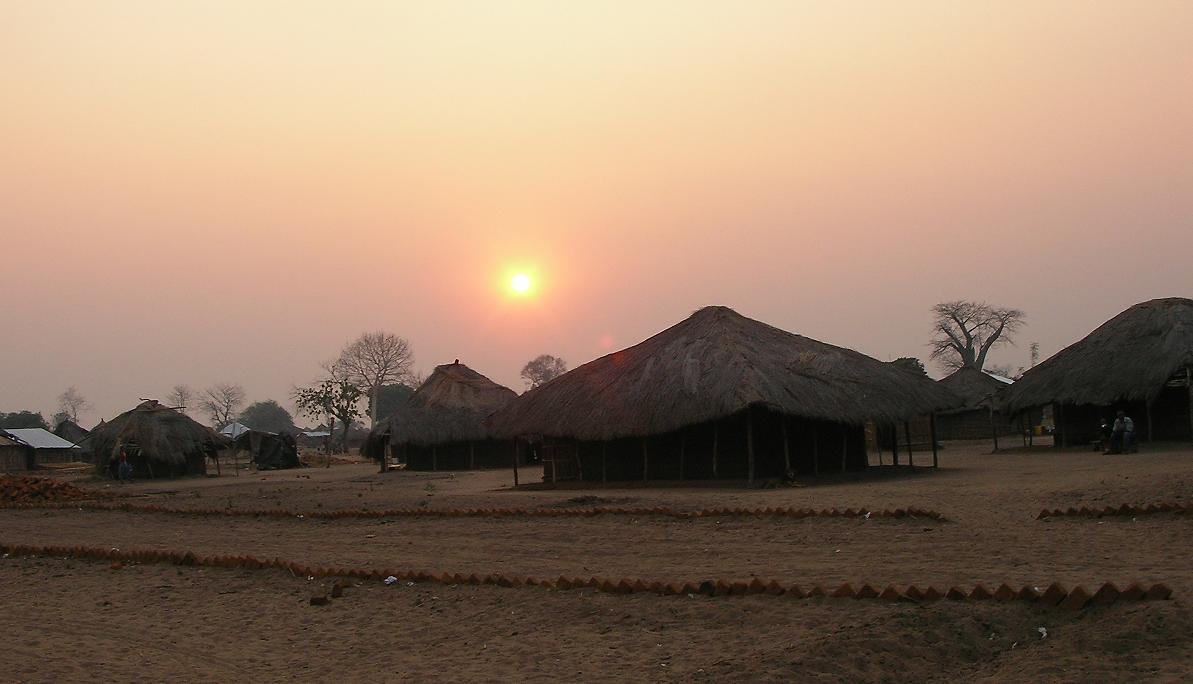

- Location within Mozambique
- Coordinates: 17°50′S 35°20′E
- Country: Mozambique
- Provinces: Sofala Province

Caia is a town on the south bank of the Zambezi River in Sofala Province, Mozambique. It is a relatively small town with few modern facilities besides a petrol station and the neighbouring bank. Caia and surrounding communities have been experiencing an escalating HIV/AIDS epidemic, drawing national and foreign aid to the area, including a Canadian foundation called the Caia Connection based in Vila de Sena, 57.6 Kilometres north of Caia.

== Transportation ==
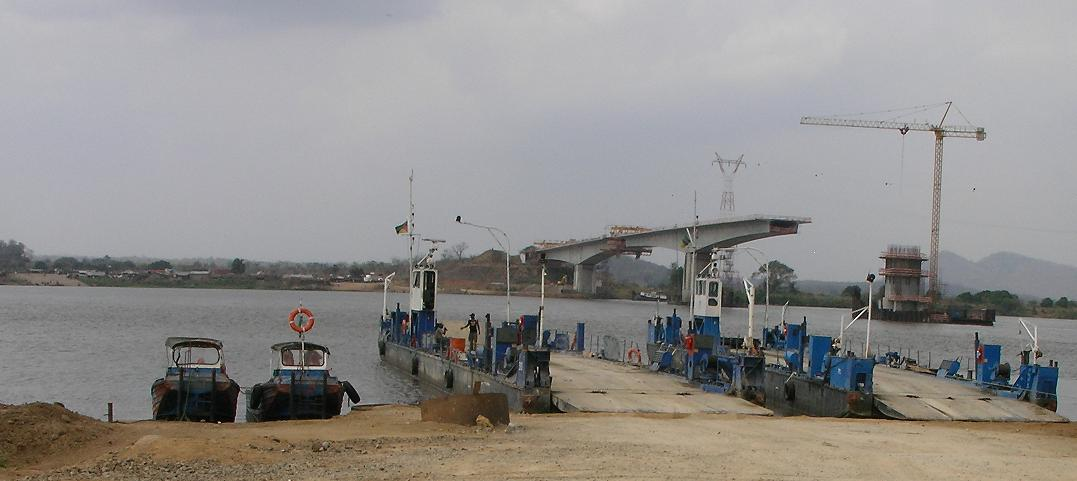
Caia bridge under construction.

In March 2007, construction commenced on what would be the longest road bridge to span the Zambezi. The bridge over the Zambezi was officially opened on August 1, 2009, and with some controversy, was named after the current president of Mozambique, Armando Emilio Guebuza. With a length of 2376 metres and width of 16 m it will be longer than the bridges at Tete and Katima Mulilo, exceeded only by the Dona Ana Bridge, which has been restored as a rail only bridge. The anticipated bridge was crucial in linking the Sofala Province and the Zambezia Province. The Caia bridge cost an estimated US$80 million.

Caia also has an airport with a 900-metre paved runway, and is a station on the Sena railway from Beira via the Dona Ana Bridge to Malawi, Moatize and Tete, which was the damaged in the Mozambique Civil War and is currently being rehabilitated.

== See also ==
- Railway stations in Mozambique
- Vila Fontes was the colonial name.
