= Soares da Costa =

Soares da Costa logo

Soares da Costa SGPS, S.A. (Euronext: SCOAE, Sociedade de Construções Soares da Costa S.A.) is a Portuguese company. Its main activities are civil engineering and construction, public works, real estate, housing construction, production of construction materials and other related activities. Grupo Soares da Costa is one of the largest groups in the civil construction and public works sector in Portugal. The corporate structure is based on three sub-holdings which correspond to three business groups: Construction, Concessions and Real Estate.

The company was founded in 1918 in Porto by José Soares da Costa. Today it possesses a strong international focus (over 70% per cent of their business volume in 2012 was of an international nature), with offices in Angola, Mozambique, United States (Florida), Brazil, Romania and Israel. Ranked among the 100 largest groups in the sector, the company maintains a permanent presence in the Portuguese speaking African countries. The activities of the Group in the international market have increased in importance, and in 2012 represented 70.5% of the business volume. The internationalization process began in 1979 with the creation of an associated company in Venezuela, reaching global dimension with activities in territories as diverse in nature as Iraq, Spain, Egypt, Germany, Macau, Barbados and Romania.

In a worldwide ranking performed by the North American magazine Engineering News-Record (2013), the company holds the 108th position as an international contractor.
