= Samora Machel Bridge =

Bridge across the Zambezi River in Mozambique

Samora Machel Bridge Ponte Samora Machel
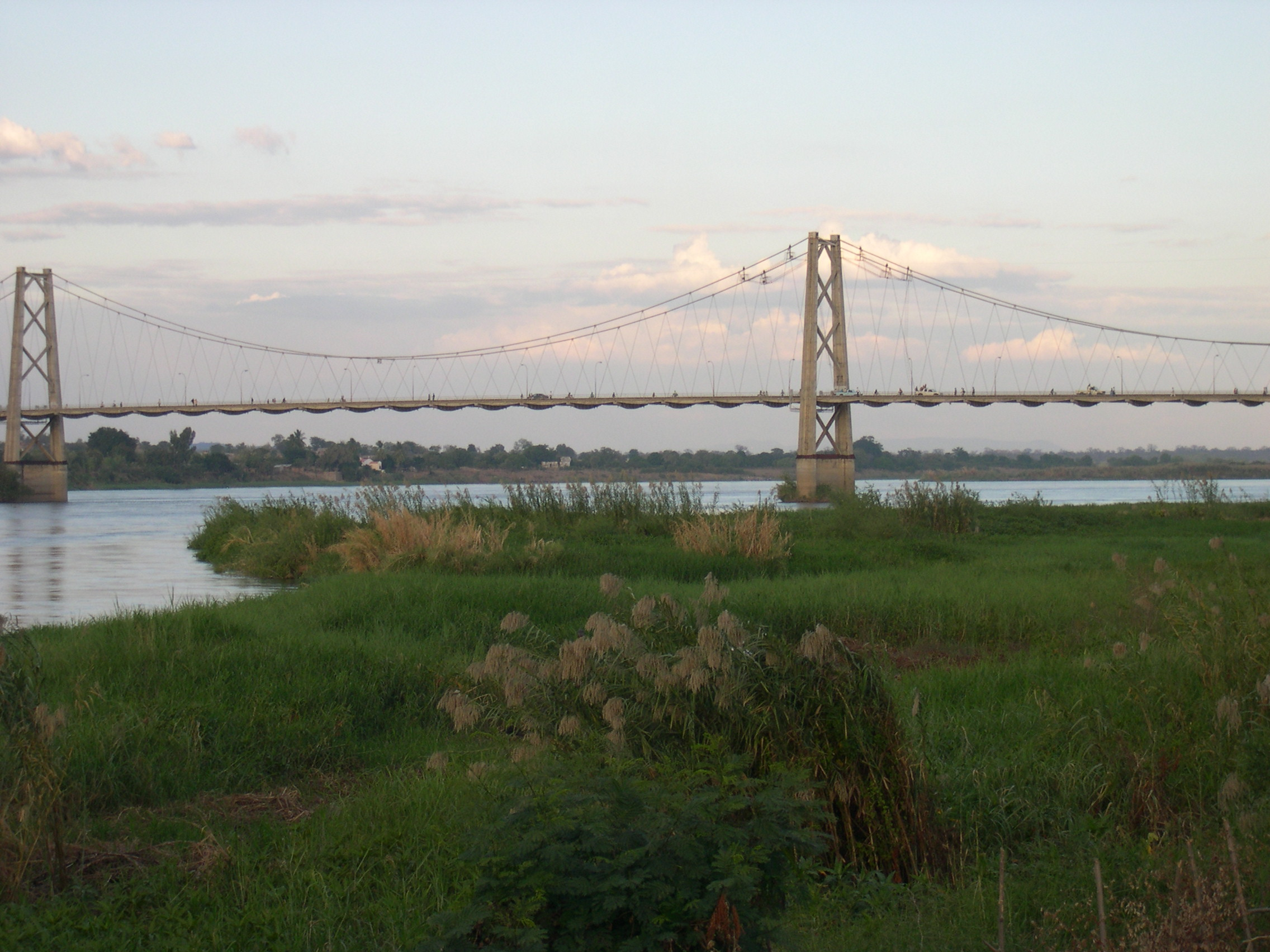
- Coordinates: 16°09′18″S 33°35′37″E
- Carries: A103 road
- Crosses: Zambezi River
- Locale: Tete and Moatize in Mozambique
- Other name: Tete Bridge
- Followed by: Dona Ana Bridge

Characteristics
- Design: Suspension bridge
- Total length: 762 metres (2,500 ft)
- Longest span: 180 metres (590 ft)
- No. of spans: 5

History
- Designer: Edgar Cardoso
- Construction start: 1968
- Construction end: 1972

Location
- Interactive map of Samora Machel Bridge

Samora Machel Bridge is a bridge in Mozambique across the Zambezi River. It is named after Samora Machel, the former President of Mozambique.

It links Tete, the capital of Tete Province, to Moatize. The bridge also connects the countries of Zimbabwe and Malawi.

== See also ==
- List of crossings of the Zambezi River
