= Kaúlza de Arriaga =

Portuguese general (1915–2004)

Kaúlza de Oliveira de Arriaga
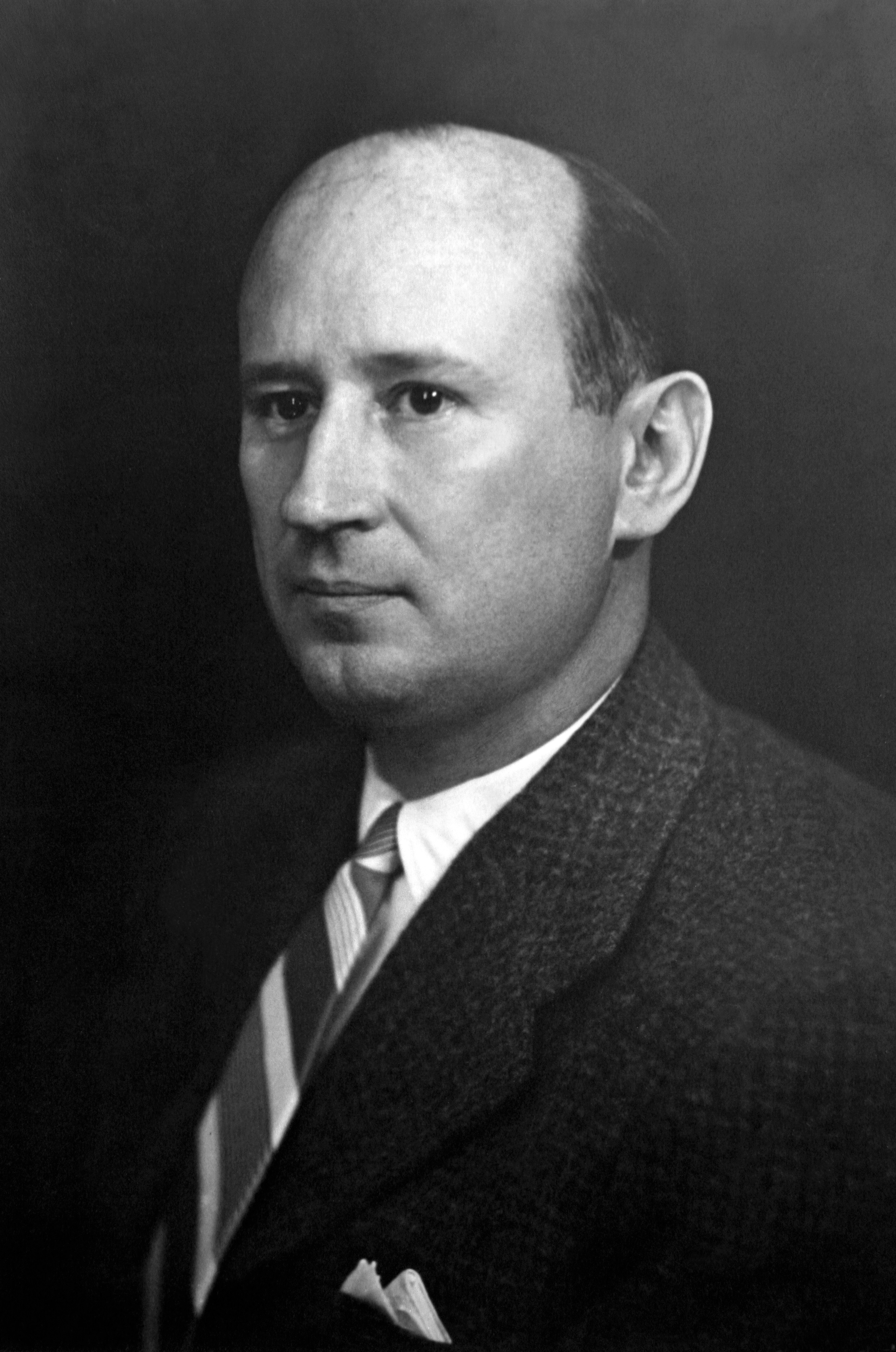
- Born: 18 January 1915; Porto, Portugal
- Died: 2 February 2004 (aged 89); Lisbon, Portugal
- Military career
- Allegiance: Portugal
- Branch: Portuguese Army
- Service years: 1935–1974
- Rank: General
- Conflicts: Mozambican War of Independence
- Awards: Officer of the Order of Aviz; Grand Officer of the Order of Military Merit of Brazil; Legion of Merit of the United States of America; Grand Cross and Grand Officer of the Order of Christ; Grand Officer of the Légion d'honneur of France; Grand Officer of the Order of Prince Henry and the Medal of Aeronautical Merit of the Portuguese Air Force; Commander of the Order of the Holy Sepulchre

Kaúlza de Oliveira de Arriaga, OA, GCC, OC, OIH (18 January 1915 – 2 February 2004) was a Portuguese general, writer, professor and politician. He was Secretary of State (junior minister) of the Air Force between 1953 and 1955 and commander of the Terrestrial Forces in Mozambique from 1969 until 1974 during the Mozambican War of Independence.

== Ancestry ==
He was a son of Manuel dos Santos Lima de Arriaga Nunes (1885–1940), a sculptor and son of a medical doctor from Pico Island, Azores, and his Portuguese Brazilian wife, Felicidade Eugénia Martins de Oliveira (1894–1987), daughter and granddaughter of goldsmiths. The couple married in Porto on 20 June 1914.

== Career ==
Arriaga completed a degree in mathematics and engineering at the University of Porto and then volunteered for the Portuguese Army on 1 November 1935. Taking a military and civil engineering course in the Military Academy which he graduated from in 1939, he was later assigned to the general staff of the Portuguese Institute of Military Studies. Here he petitioned for reforms to the conscription system, as well as training and the integration of paratroopers into the Portuguese Air Force.

Arriaga commanded, as the Commander in Chief of the Armed Forces, the Portuguese forces in Mozambique from 1969 until 1974, taking over from General António Augusto dos Santos and organizing Operação Nó Górdio ("Operation Gordian Knot") in 1970. This operation, the largest and most expensive military operation performed by the Portuguese Armed Forces during the entire Portuguese Colonial War (1961–1974), aimed to attack FRELIMO in its Northern Mozambican support base, but only led to increased support for the rebellion among the populace.

Arriaga was a major political figure in the Estado Novo regime before the Carnation Revolution of 25 April 1974 in Lisbon, holding a number of public positions such as Head of the Ministry of Defense Cabinet, Secretary of State for Aeronautics, Professor of the Institute of High Military Studies, President of the Nuclear Energy Joint Commission and Executive President of the oil company Angol SA.

In March 1974, he organised an abortive coup d'état against Prime Minister Marcelo Caetano in an attempt to move the regime to the right and ensure a hard line on Portugal's colonial empire. Arriaga had tried in December 1973 to enlist MFA support for this coup attempt, but failed. Following the Carnation Revolution, he was arrested on 28 September 1974 and spent sixteen months in prison. In 1977 he founded the Independent Movement for the National Reconstruction (MIRN), a right-wing political organisation which appealed to ultranationalist youth and contested the 1980 Portuguese legislative election as Party of the Portuguese Right (PDP) in coalition with the Christian Democratic Party and the National Front, receiving 0.4% of the vote. He was the movement's president and then the party's chairman until its extinction in 1984.

He died from Alzheimer's disease in 2004, in Lisbon.

== Decorations ==
Arriaga received a number of awards and citations during his career, including:

- Officer of the Order of Aviz
- Grand Officer of the Order of Military Merit of Brazil
- Commander of the Legion of Merit of the United States of America
- Grand Cross of the Order of Christ
- Grand Officer of the Order of Christ
- Grand Officer of the Légion d'honneur of France
- Grand Officer of the Order of Prince Henry (Ordem do Infante Dom Henrique)
- Medal of Aeronautical Merit of the Portuguese Air Force
- Commander of the Order of the Holy Sepulchre

== Family ==
Arriaga married in Reguengos de Monsaraz, at the Chapel of o Monte de São Mamede, on 19 May 1955 Maria do Carmo Fernandes Formigal (b. 1932), Dame Commander of the Order of the Holy Sepulchre, daughter of Mário Formigal (1899-1954), a landowner and son of another, and his wife (m. 1922) Maria Adelaide Rosado Fernandes (1903-1981), of a family of farmers and landowners in Évora, Alto Alentejo, by whom he had five children, including the second wife of former prime minister Pedro Santana Lopes.

== Published works ==
- Atomic Energy - 1949
- the Portuguese National Defense in Last the 40 years and the Future - 1966
- Some Nuclear Questions in Portugal - 1969
- Lições de estratégia de curso de altos comandos—1966/67 (Lessons Of Strategy in the Course of High Command, 1966/67), Vol. 12 (1971)
- The Portuguese Answer - 1973
- Courage, Tenacity and Faith - 1973
- the National Conjuncture and My Position before the Moment Portuguese Politician - 1976
- In the way of the Solutions of the Future - 1977
- Africa - the Betrayed Victory (co-author) - 1977
- War and Politics - On behalf of the Decisive Truth, Years (two editions) - 1987
- Global Strategy - 1988
- Syntheses (two editions) - 1992
- Maastricht - 1992

== See also ==
- Gordian Knot Operation
- Portuguese Colonial War
- Mozambican War of Independence
