= Tete, Mozambique =

Tete
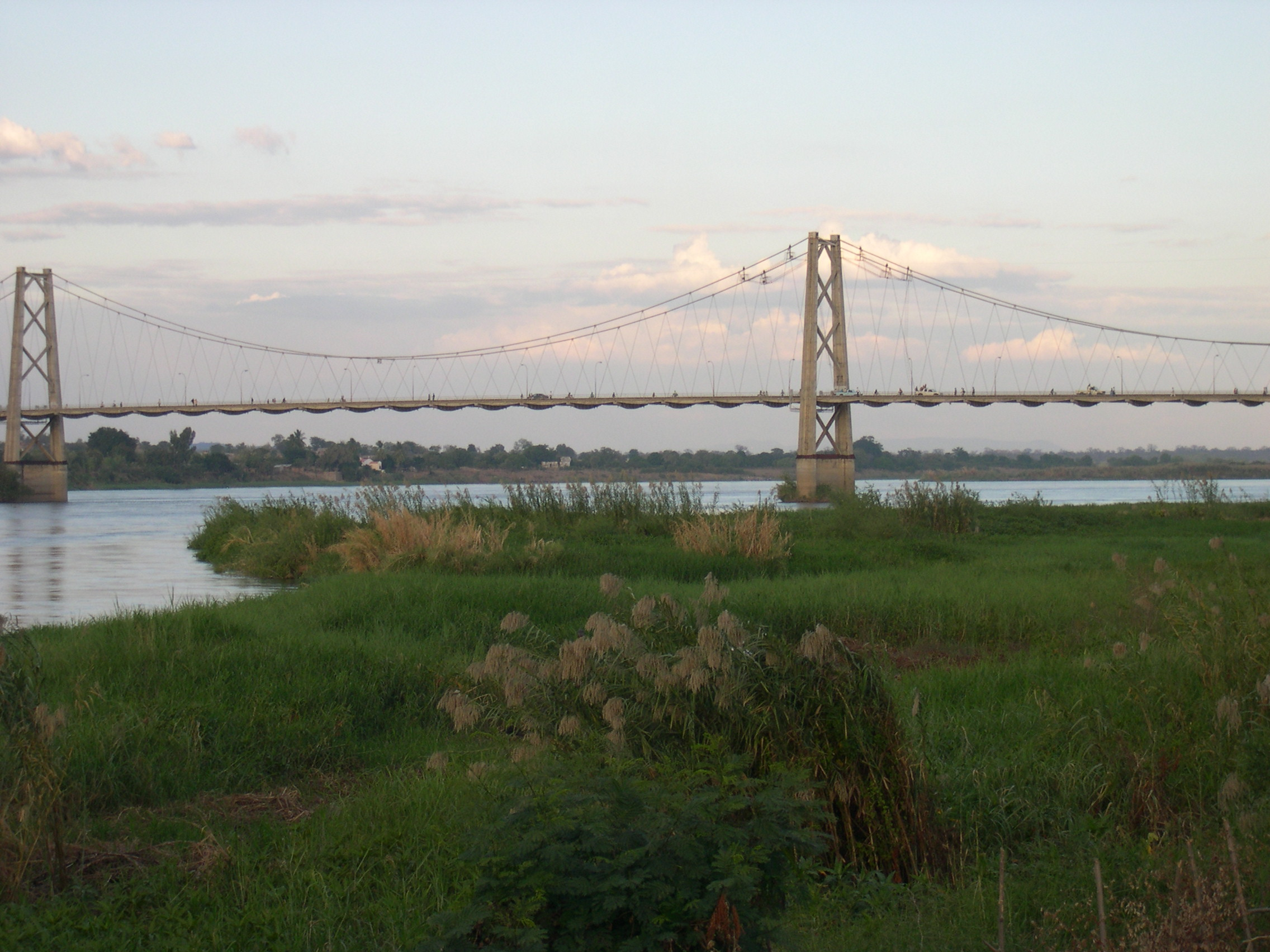
- One-kilometre-long suspension bridge over the Zambezi River

- Location within Mozambique
- Coordinates: 16°10′S 33°36′E
- Country: Mozambique
- Province: Tete Province
- District: Cidade de Tete

Area
  - Total: 149.3 km^{2} (57.6 sq mi)
- Elevation: 140 m (460 ft)

Population (2017 census)
  - Total: 305,722
  - Density: 2,048/km^{2} (5,304/sq mi)
- Climate: BSh

Tete is the capital city of Tete Province in Mozambique. It is located on the Zambezi River, and is the site of two of the four bridges crossing the river in Mozambique. A Swahili trade center before the Portuguese colonial era, Tete continues to dominate the west-central part of the country and region, and is the largest city on the Zambezi. In the local language, Nyungwe, Tete (or Mitete) means "reed".

== History ==
The region was an important Swahili trade center before the Portuguese colonial era. On the east coast of Africa the Portuguese were drawn to Mozambique and the Zambezi river by news of a local ruler, the Munhumutapa, who was said to have had fabulous wealth in gold. In their efforts to reach the Munhumutapa, the Portuguese established in 1531 two settlements far up the Zambezi – one of them, at Tete, some 420 kilometres (260 mi) from the sea. In 1561 Muslims at the Munhumutapa capital convinced the king to kill Gonçalo da Silveira. In retaliation the Portuguese launched a large campaign with 1000 men in 1568 and the Swahili presence at Tete was terminated.

The Mutapa Empire and gold mines remained autonomous and mostly isolated from the Portuguese. But in this region of east Africa – as in Portuguese Guinea and Angola in the west – Portuguese involvement became sufficiently strong to survive into the third quarter of the 20th century. Under Portuguese influence Tete had become a market centre for ivory and gold by the mid-17th century. Given a Portuguese town charter in 1761, it became a city of the Portuguese Overseas Province of Mozambique in 1959. After the Portuguese Colonial War in Portuguese Africa and the April 1974 military coup in Lisbon, the then Portuguese Overseas Province of Mozambique become an independent state. The newly independent People's Republic of Mozambique, created in 1975 after the exodus of Mozambique's ethnic Portuguese, descended into civil war between 1977 and 1992.

== Transportation ==
Chingozi Airport (IATA: TET, ICAO: FQTT) on the northeastern side of the city has a 2.4 km paved runway. The one-kilometre-long Samora Machel Bridge, finished in 1973 by the Portuguese and designed by Edgar Cardoso, is a vital link on the major highway linking not just the northern and southern parts of the country, but Zimbabwe and Malawi as well. A second bridge south of the city was opened in late 2014 to allow traffic to Zambia or Malawi to bypass the provincial capital. Tete's bridges, the rail Dona Ana Bridge, and the Armando Emilio Guebuza Bridge at Caia are the only bridges across the lower Zambezi.

== Demographics ==
Year	Population
1997 census	101,984
2007 census	155,870
2017 census	305,722

Projected to be the ninth fastest growing city on the African continent between 2020 and 2025, with a 5.56% growth.

== Climate ==
Tete has a hot semi-arid climate (Köppen climate classification BSh).

Climate data for Tete (1952–2022 normals and extremes)
Month	Jan	Feb	Mar	Apr	May	Jun	Jul	Aug	Sep	Oct	Nov	Dec	Year
Record high °C (°F)	41.4 (106.5)	41.5 (106.7)	40.0 (104.0)	41.0 (105.8)	41.0 (105.8)	35.7 (96.3)	35.5 (95.9)	39.7 (103.5)	42.5 (108.5)	44.5 (112.1)	45.5 (113.9)	43.2 (109.8)	45.5 (113.9)
Mean daily maximum °C (°F)	33.6 (92.5)	33.3 (91.9)	33.1 (91.6)	32.8 (91.0)	31.1 (88.0)	28.7 (83.7)	28.3 (82.9)	30.8 (87.4)	33.5 (92.3)	35.9 (96.6)	36.4 (97.5)	34.3 (93.7)	32.7 (90.8)
Daily mean °C (°F)	28.5 (83.3)	28.2 (82.8)	27.9 (82.2)	27.1 (80.8)	24.7 (76.5)	22.1 (71.8)	21.8 (71.2)	24.0 (75.2)	26.8 (80.2)	29.3 (84.7)	30.1 (86.2)	28.9 (84.0)	26.6 (79.9)
Mean daily minimum °C (°F)	23.4 (74.1)	23.2 (73.8)	22.7 (72.9)	21.4 (70.5)	18.5 (65.3)	15.5 (59.9)	15.6 (60.1)	17.4 (63.3)	20.2 (68.4)	22.7 (72.9)	23.9 (75.0)	23.6 (74.5)	20.7 (69.2)
Record low °C (°F)	18.7 (65.7)	19.5 (67.1)	16.8 (62.2)	15.0 (59.0)	10.5 (50.9)	6.0 (42.8)	8.1 (46.6)	7.6 (45.7)	11.0 (51.8)	14.0 (57.2)	16.1 (61.0)	14.9 (58.8)	6.0 (42.8)
Average precipitation mm (inches)	166.7 (6.56)	142.1 (5.59)	95.5 (3.76)	15.0 (0.59)	5.8 (0.23)	3.5 (0.14)	2.9 (0.11)	1.8 (0.07)	0.8 (0.03)	10.8 (0.43)	45.6 (1.80)	139.4 (5.49)	629.9 (24.8)
Average precipitation days	10.8	9.2	6.6	2.4	0.9	1.2	1.0	0.4	0.2	1.1	4.4	9.6	47.8
Average relative humidity (%)	69	73	67	61	60	61	59	54	47	43	54	62	59
Mean monthly sunshine hours	201.5	192.1	235.6	240.0	254.2	243.0	235.6	272.8	267.0	282.1	249.0	204.6	2,877.5
Source 1: World Meteorological Organization (preipitation 1961–1990) Weltwetter Spiegel Online (sun and relative humidity) Starlings Roost Weather
Source 2: BBC Weather

== Notable people ==
- Francisca Chiponda
