= Aquino de Bragança =

Mozambican scholar (1924–1986)

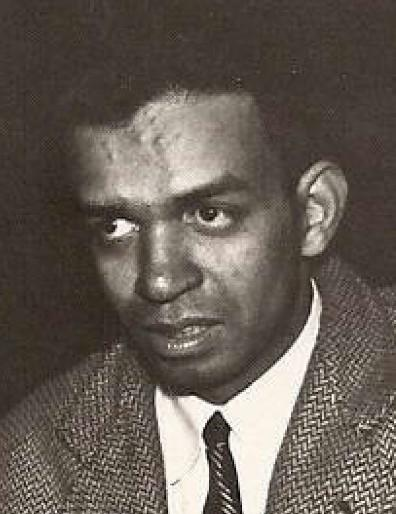
- De Bragança during his youth
- Born: Tomaz Aquino Messias de Bragança; 6 April 1924; Salvador do Mundo, Goa, Portuguese India
- Died: 19 October 1986 (aged 62); Lebombo Mountains, South African side
- Education: University of Grenoble; University of Paris
- Occupations: Physicist, journalist, diplomat, social scientist
- Known for: Campaign for decolonization of Mozambique
- Spouse: Mariana Bragança (died 1979) Silvia do Rosário da Silveira (m. 1984)
- Children: 2

Tomaz Aquino Messias de Bragança (6 April 1924 – 19 October 1986) was a Mozambican physicist, journalist, diplomat and social scientist at the Eduardo Mondlane University. He played a leading intellectual and political role in the campaign for the decolonialisation of Mozambique from its colonial power.

== Early life ==
Tomaz Aquino Messias de Bragança was born on 6 April 1946 in Salvador do Mundo in Goa, which was part of Portuguese India. His parents were João Paulo Proença Bragança and Ana Carlota Praxetes Antónia do Rosário Sousa. Both lived in the former Portuguese colony of Goa. He spent his childhood in Goa, where he attended school. The high school he studied at was the Liceu Nacional Afonso de Albuquerque in the town then called Nova Goa, (later called Panjim then Panaji). In 1945 he took part in a training course for Chemical Engineering in Dharwad, in what was then British India.

== Career ==
As a young adult, de Bragança was in Portuguese East Africa in 1947, there to look for work. During this time he was confronted with the effects of the Portuguese colonial policy, which exercised a decisive influence on him for the rest of his life.

Aquino de Bragança moved to Portugal by 1948, where he later met the writer Orlando da Costa, who was also from Goa, and who studied philosophy at the University of Lisbon. Here Aquino de Bragança also came across the physician Arménio Ferreira and the Casa dos Estudantes do Império, a centre for students from the African and other colonies of Portugal.

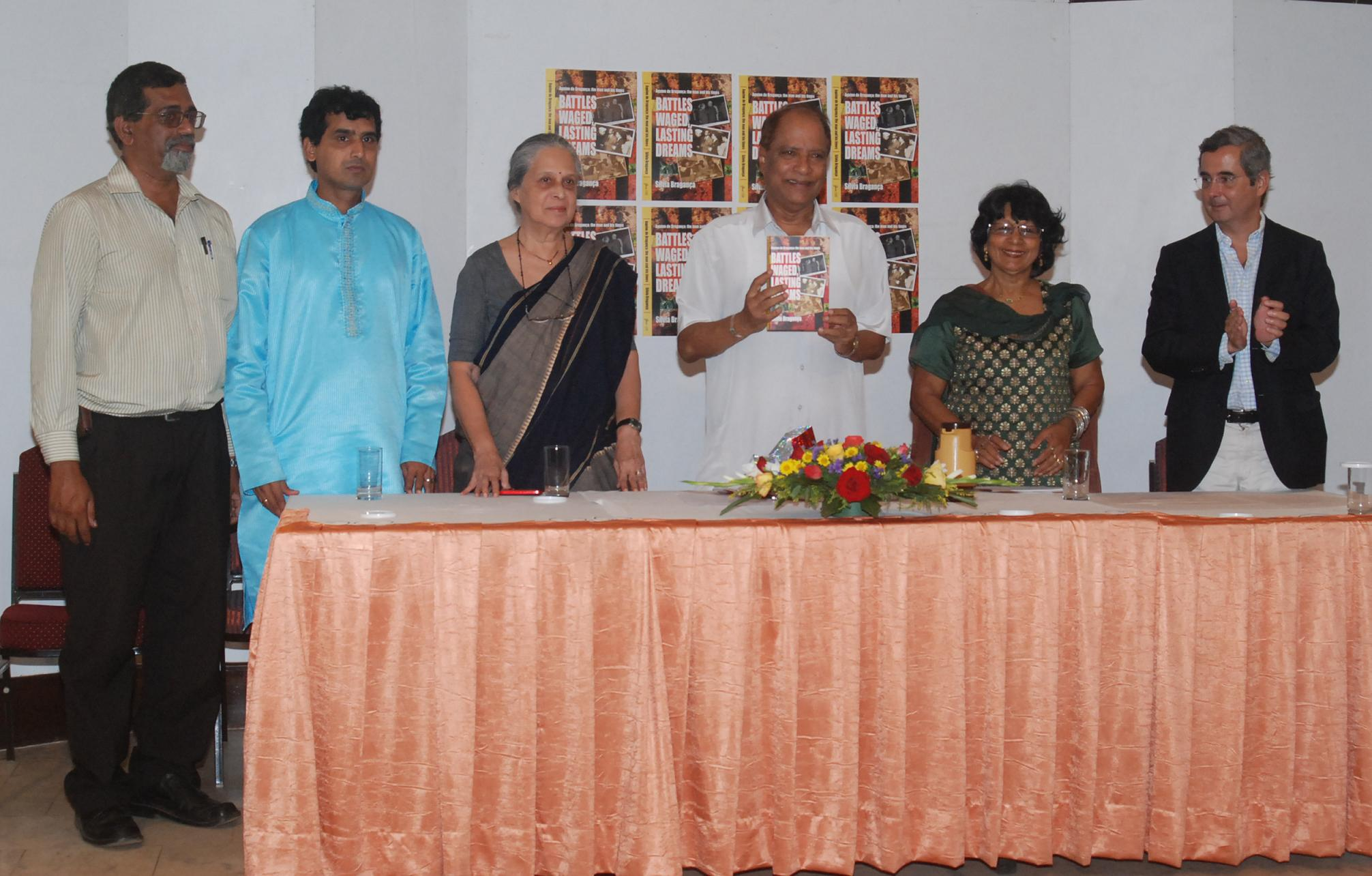
At Panjim, Goa, April 2011, during the launch of the book on Aquino de Bragança. From left, Miguel Braganza (a relative), historian Prajal Sakhardande, littérateur Dr Maria Aurora Couto, former Indian federal minister Eduardo Faleiro, author Silvia Bragança and Portuguese Consul-General in Goa Dr Antonio Costa Sabido.

In 1951, Aquino de Bragança headed for France. In Grenoble and Paris, he studied physics. In both places, he met students who were aware of the role of Portugal as a colonial power, and had negative and critical positions on the same, including Mário Pinto de Andrade, Frantz Fanon, and Marcelino dos Santos. Aquino de Bragança developed at that time a strong political consciousness of the Marxist variety and lived with the hope that the colony of Goa could be independent from Portugal. On the basis of his shared ideas with other activists from various Portuguese colonies, he created personal bonds.

Within such political activists, he developed a Paris-Casablanca Algiers group designated as an informal alliance, as a result of the Confederação das Organizações Nacionalistas das Colonias Portuguesas (CONCP, Conference of Nationalist Organisations of Portuguese Colonie).

In 1957 Aquino de Bragança emigrated to Rabat in Morocco, to start teaching science. There he married his first wife Mariana. Both the couple's children were born in Morocco. During this time he worked as a journalist and increasingly wrote for the Simon Malley-founded Afrique-Asie magazine in Paris.

With the consent of King Mohamed V, he started writing for the Moroccan newspaper Al Istiqlal and worked as a private secretary of Mehdi Ben Barka, a Moroccan opposition leader, whom he had met in Paris.

When the PAIGC and the MPLA in 1961 set up an office of CONCP in Rabat to coordinate the political work of the independence movement of Portuguese colonies, together with the trade unionist and campaigner George Vaz, he represented the Goan People's Party within the new organization. His participation in this umbrella organization led to a growing influence in CONCP Secretariat and expanding contacts with leading figures in the liberation movements on the African continent.

The Bragança family lived until 1962 in Morocco. In the same year they moved to Algiers in Algeria. During this time he worked under simple conditions and his journalistic activities offered only a modest living. He is co-founder of the weekly newspaper Révolution Africaine, and wrote for the daily newspaper El Moudjahid.

By this time, the government of the dictator Salazar had become aware of his political activities and therefore sought an arrest warrant for the Portuguese secret police (PIDE) dated 14 March 1962. All his activities were monitored by the PIDE and recorded in regular reports.

In 1965, he is found as a participant of 3 to 8 October at the second CONCP conference in Dar es Salaam, which had Agostinho Neto as Secretary and was organised by Mário Pinto de Andrade (MPLA) and Amalia de Fonseca and Aquino himself. He participated as an author and co-author along with Pascoal Mocumbi and Edmundo Rocha of the conference documents (for example, "The political situation in Portugal" and "Liberation struggle in the Portuguese colonies").

On the recommendation of Simon Malley, he took on the task of commentator on issues in the Portuguese colonies since 1969 for Africasia, which later became Afrique-Asie. Together with Immanuel Wallerstein and Melo Antunes, the three-volume work Quem é o inimigo ("Who is the enemy?") came about. It dealt with key issues of colonialism, and first appeared in 1978 in Lisbon.

His work in Algeria reflects a stage of comprehensive journalistic activities with the objectives of promoting the African liberation movements and participation in logistical support, building their international profile and promoting the training of journalists. In this way, Aquino de Bragança was founder of the Algerian School of Journalism, where he taught courses in the sociology of journalism. During his varied activities he met leading figures of the liberation movements, was their counselor and was friends with a number of these people. From this group of people are Mário Pinto de Andrade, Ben Bella, Amílcar Cabral, Samora Machel, Agostinho Neto and Eduardo Mondlane.

After the Carnation Revolution of 1974 in Portugal, Aquino de Bragança decided to step up further engagement in Mozambique. This event had changed the balance of power in southern Africa completely. At the beginning of this new chapter of life, he was commissioned by Samora Machel in May 1974 with a political mission in Lisbon, in order to figure out the new negotiating partner for the FRELIMO in a situation where the power in a state of flux in the colonial capital, Lisbon.

This led to a meeting with Ernesto Melo Antunes and first official contacts with Mário Soares, whom he had met earlier in Paris, and with the Portuguese Minister for inter-territorial contacts, António de Almeida Santos. Aquino de Bragança introduced the first official talks on behalf of his future homeland of Mozambique with the new political forces of the former colonial power, Portugal. As a result, there developed intense working contacts between the two sides, which were largely driven by Victor Crespo for the Portuguese government and by Joaquim Chissano and Aquino de Bragança for Mozambican negotiator. In September 1974, representatives from both sides met in Lusaka for further negotiations. In this context, there were discussions between Samora Machel and Ramalho Eanes, who later became President of Portugal, a longtime General in Angola and a member of the Movimento das Forças Armadas.

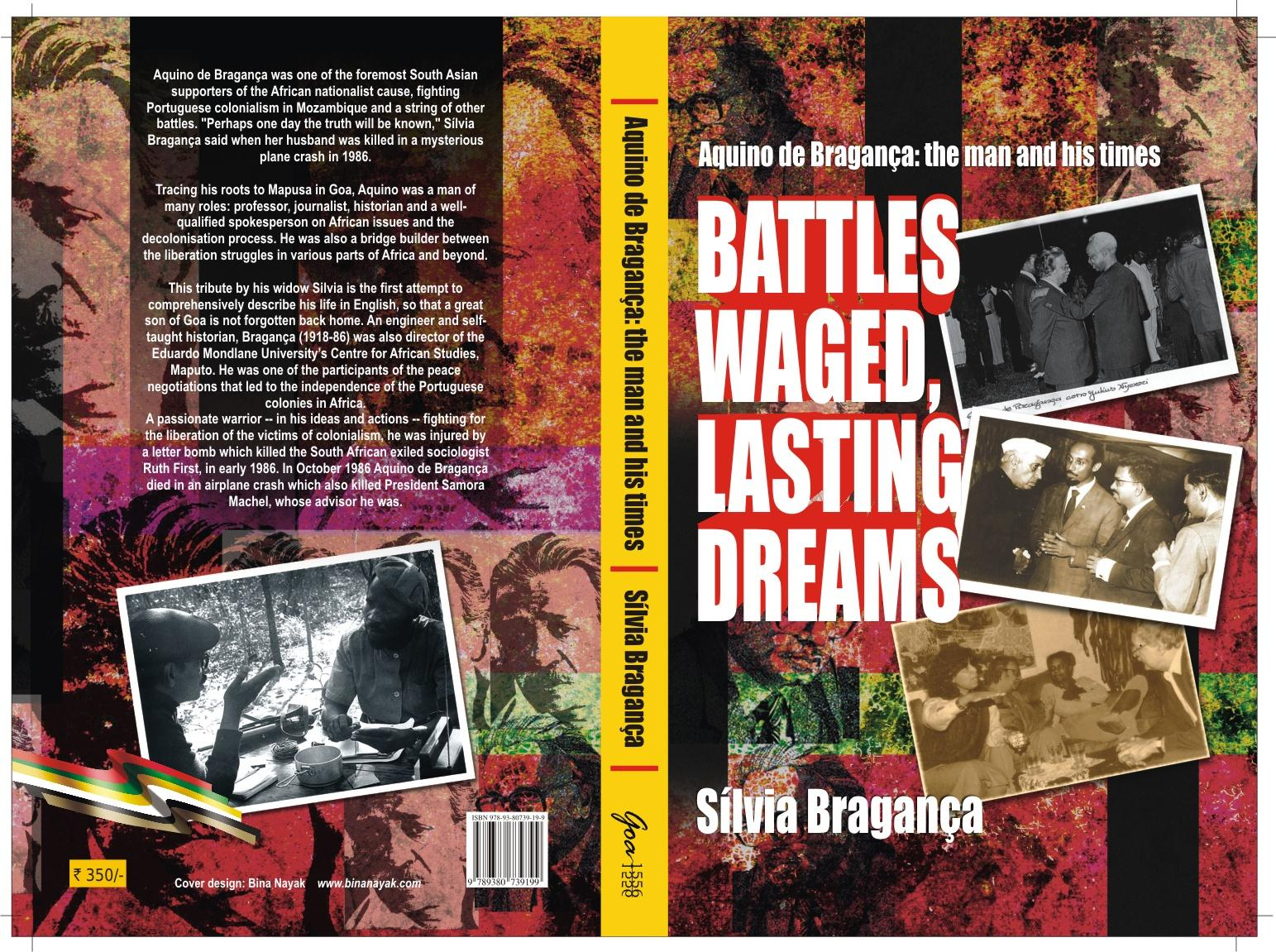
Cover of the English-language version of the Aquino biography.

After the victory of FRELIMO in Mozambique, Aquino de Bragança waived aside a possible ministerial post in the government of Samora Machel. Instead, he took over the position of his adviser, founded in 1975 the Center for African Studies at the Eduardo Mondlane University in Maputo. The following year he was appointed director of this research area. The studies were concerned with development issues within Mozambique and the situation in the neighboring country of Rhodesia. The South African journalist and sociologist Ruth First took over as Director of Research here in 1977. She had previously taught at the University of Durham, UK. Together, they put together an international group of social scientists. The first project of its collaboration dedicated under the title "The Mozambican Miner", focussing on the Mozambican miners in South Africa. In the assassination of Ruth First in 1982 in the university premises by the use of a South African-sourced letter bomb, Aquino was seriously injured, while Ruth First died of this attack.

The amicable relationship of trust with Samora Machel gave him a special place in post-colonial Mozambique. Within the government, Aquino de Bragança was nicknamed "the submarine", apparently because of his ability to work behind the scenes. Asked about his political creed, he described himself as an "anti-anti-communist."

== Death ==
De Bragança died on 19 October 1986 in a Tupolev Tu-134 plane crash in the Lebombo Mountains, near the border between Mozambique and South Africa. With him on board the plane were President Samora Machel and 33 other senior officials. The causes of the crash were still unclear. Before his death, Bragança worked on the preparations for a meeting between South African Foreign Minister Pik Botha and Samora Machel, which could have resulted in a reduction of conflicts between the two countries.

== Personal life ==
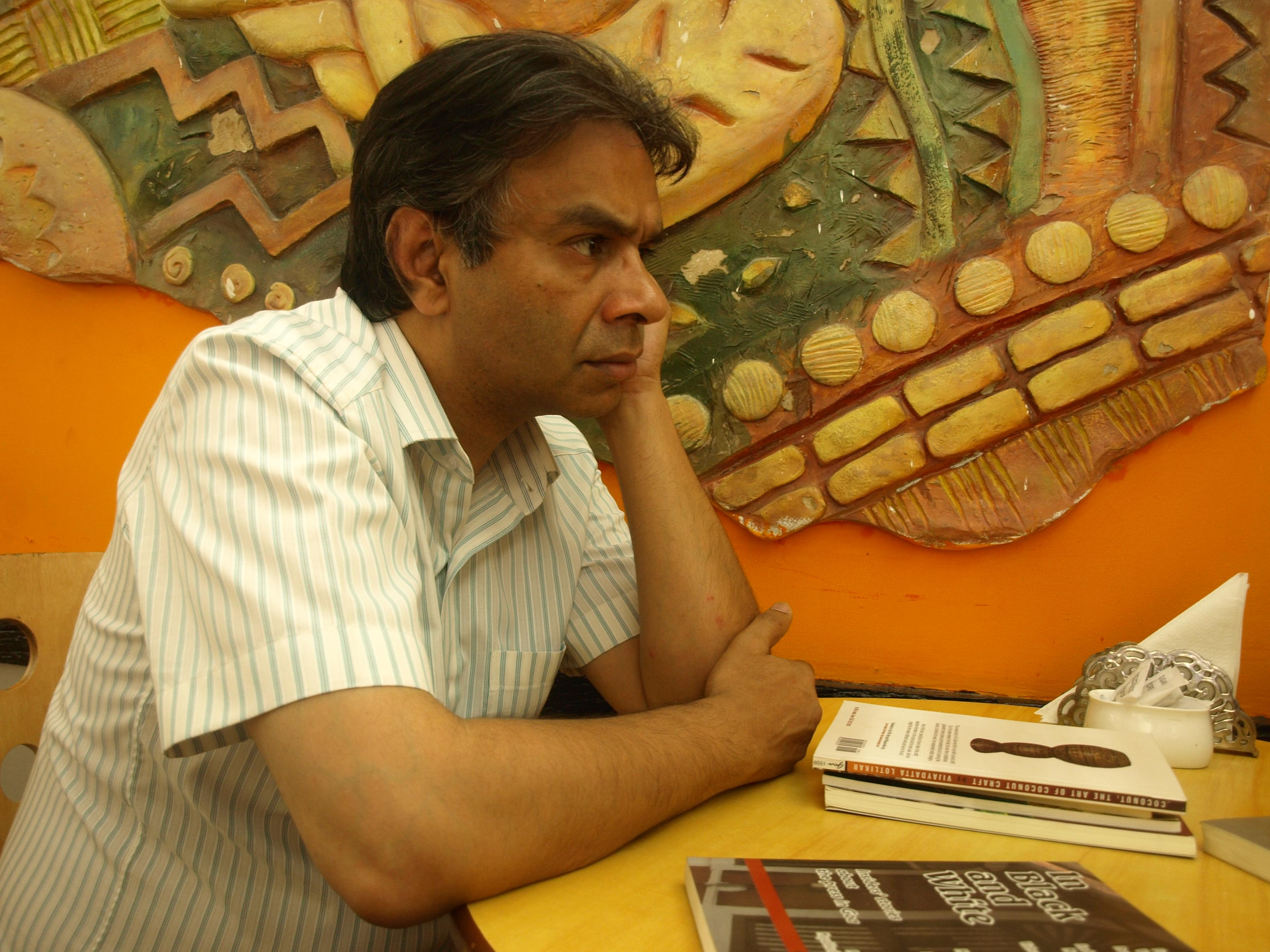
Radek, son of Aquino de Bragança, at Panjim during a visit to Goa. Circa 2011.

De Bragança was married to Mariana Bragança. From his first marriage two children, daughter Maya (1 March 1962) and son Radek (30 November 1959) were born. On 23 May 1979 his first wife died after a battle with cancer. His second marriage to Silvia do Rosário da Silveira was on 22 September 1984. Both for a year had previously met in Lisbon.

== Legacy ==
- The Centro de Estudos sociais Aquino de Bragança (CESAB) at the Eduardo Mondlane University in Maputo bears his name.
- The University of São Paulo named their research area of Social Studies (Centro de Estudos sociais Aquino de Bragança) after him.
- The former Indian union minister Eduardo Faleiro (also ex-Commissioner for NRI Affairs) 2011, commended the life work of Aquino de Bragança in the world of global liberation movements.

== Selected works ==
- Brandt, Krupp et le Portugal. In: Africasia No. 12, 30 March 1970, pp. 14–16
- Amílcar Cabral. Lisbon 1976
- Independence without decolonization: the transfer of power in Mozambique, 1974–1975. Harare 1985
- Zimbabwe: Réflexions sur le problème rhodésien. Etude de Centre d'Etudes du Africaines Mozambique, In: Revue tiers-monde, Vol 20 (1979), pp. 79–118 ISSN 0040-7356
- Aquino de Braganca, Immanuel Maurice Wallerstein: African Liberation Reader. 3 volumes, 1982
- Aquino de Braganca, Jacques Depelchin: From the idealization of Frelimo to the understanding of the recent history of Mozambique. In: African Journal of Political Economy, Vol 1, No. 1, 1986, pp. 162–180

== Citations ==
- Alexandre Moniz Barbosa: Mozambique's immortal Goan connection. In: The Times of India. April 2, 2011
- Gary Littlejohn: Aquino de Braganca. In: The Review of African Political Economy. Vol 13 No 37 (Winter 1986), pp. 4–5
