= 1986 Mozambican Tupolev Tu-134 crash =

1986 aviation accident in South Africa

Mozambican Tupolev Tu-134 crash
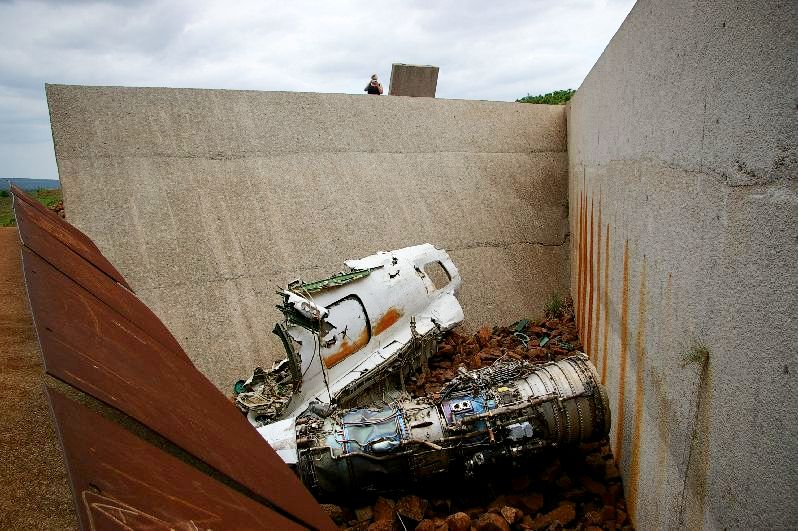
- Sections from the wreckage are now part of the Samora Machel Monument.

Accident
- Date: 19 October 1986
- Summary: Controlled flight into terrain due to lack of crew resource management and pilot error
- Site: Mbuzini, Transvaal Province (present-day Mpumalanga), South Africa; 25°54′41″S 31°57′26″E

Aircraft
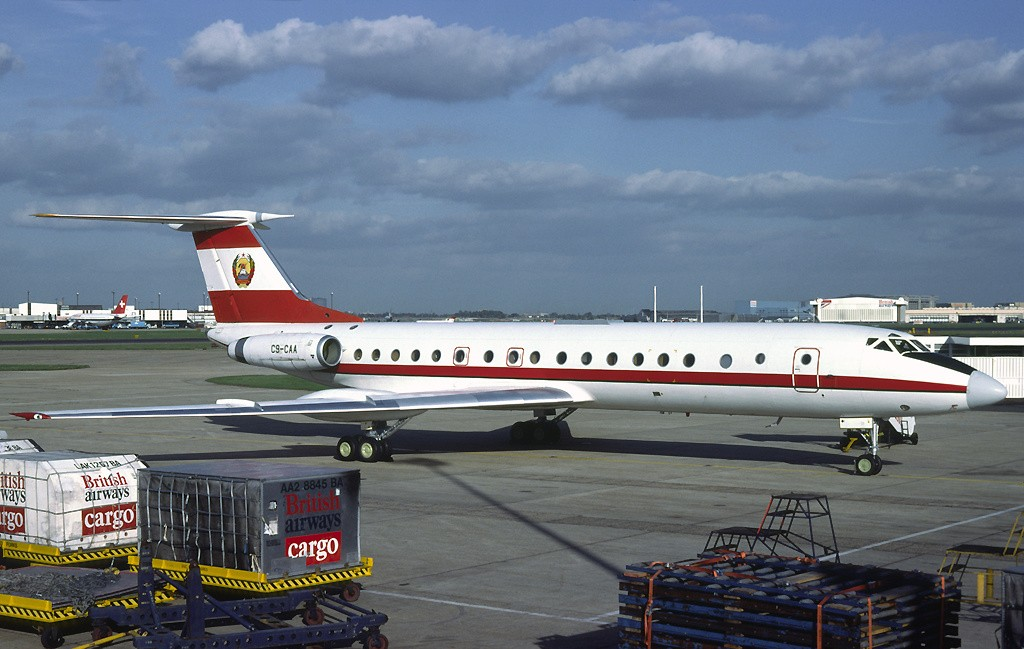
- C9-CAA, the aircraft involved in the accident
- Aircraft type: Tupolev Tu-134A-3
- Operator: Mozambique Airlines
- Registration: C9-CAA
- Flight origin: Maputo International Airport, Mozambique
- 1st stopover: Lusaka International Airport, Zambia
- Last stopover: Mbala Airport, Zambia
- Destination: Maputo International Airport, Mozambique
- Occupants: 44
- Passengers: 35
- Crew: 9
- Fatalities: 34
- Injuries: 10
- Survivors: 10

On 19 October 1986, a Tupolev Tu-134 jetliner with a Soviet crew carrying President Samora Machel and 43 others from Mbala, Zambia to the Mozambican capital Maputo crashed at Mbuzini, South Africa. Nine passengers and one crew member survived the crash, but President Machel and 33 others died, including several ministers and senior officials of the Mozambican government.

A board of inquiry blamed the captain for failing to react to the ground proximity warning system. Another theory was that the crew had set the aircraft's VOR receivers to the wrong frequency, causing them to receive signals from a different airport, or even that a false beacon had been used to lure the crew off course. While there was widespread suspicion in other nations that South Africa, which was hostile towards Machel's government at the time, was involved in the incident, no conclusive evidence was ever presented to support that allegation.

== Accident ==
=== Aircraft, flight crew and itinerary ===
All times in this article are local (UTC+2).

The aircraft involved, manufactured by Tupolev on 19 August 1980, was a Tupolev Tu-134A-3, registered as C9-CAA, with serial number 63457. It had accumulated about 1,105 flying hours since the first flight, and had undergone its last major inspection in August 1984 in the Soviet Union. Service records indicated that it had been properly maintained, and data recovered from the Digital Flight Data Recorder (DFDR) showed the aircraft and all its systems were operating normally.

In command was 48-year-old Captain Yuri Viktorovich Novodran. In total, he had logged 13,056 hours of flying time, 7,523 of which were logged on the Tu-134. His co-pilot was 29-year-old First Officer Igor Petrovich Kartamyshev. In total, he had logged 3,790 hours of flying time, 2,380 of which were logged on the Tu-134. The flight engineer was 37-year-old Vladimir B. Novoselov, logging all 6,203 of his total flight hours on the Tu-134. The navigator was 48-year-old Oleg Nikolaevich Kudryashov with 12,942 hours of flying time, 6,074 of which on the Tu-134 and the radio operator was 39-year-old Anatoly Shulipov, having logged 14,370 hours of flying time, of which 1,450 logged on the Tu-134.

All of the mentioned were Soviet state employees operating the aircraft for the Mozambican government. They were well experienced in both day and night flying in Mozambique and in landings at Maputo airport.

On the morning of 19 October, Machel boarded the flight at Maputo, and, after a refuelling stop in Lusaka, Zambia, arrived at Mbala, Zambia at 11:00. After the meeting with Kaunda and Dos Santos, Machel and his party re-boarded the aircraft and departed Mbala at 18:38 for a non-stop return to Maputo. The weather forecast for the flight was favourable, with an estimated time of arrival of 21:25.

=== Start of descent and 37° turn ===
Crash site near the converging borders of Mozambique, Swaziland, and South Africa

At 20:46, the flight made its first radio contact with Maputo air traffic control (ATC), reporting its position and that it was continuing towards the Maputo VHF Omnidirectional Range (VOR) navigation beacon while maintaining an altitude of 35,000 feet (11,000 m). At 21:02, the crew radioed that they were ready to begin descent, and were instructed by Maputo air traffic control to report reaching 3,000 feet (910 m) or when the runway lights were in sight, they began their descent for an ILS approach to runway 23.

Over the next eight minutes, the aircraft maintained its required track toward Maputo with minor lateral deviations. Then, at 21:10, the aircraft turned away from Maputo to the right, lasting almost one minute in duration resulting in a heading change from 184° to 221°. At this time, the cockpit voice recorder (CVR) recorded the navigator stating the distance remaining to Maputo as 100 kilometres (62 mi; 54 nmi), then a comment from the captain about the turn, and the navigator's response that the "VOR indicates that way".

At around 21:15, the navigator stated that the distance to Maputo was 60 kilometres (37 mi; 32 nmi). Over the next few minutes, there were several comments from the crew indicating that they believed the navigational aids at Maputo were unavailable. The captain then stated that "there is no Maputo" and "electrical power is off, chaps!", while the navigator reported that the instrument landing system (ILS) and distance measuring equipment (DME) were switched off and that the non-directional beacons (NDBs) were not working.

=== Landing clearance and impact ===
Shortly after 21:18, the aircraft reached 910 metres (3,000 ft) in its descent, and the crew informed the Maputo controller that they were maintaining that altitude. However, the flight continued to descend. The Maputo controller granted clearance for an ILS approach to runway 23, but after the flight crew reported the ILS out of service, the controller changed the clearance to a visual approach to runway 05. During this time, the navigator stated the distance to Maputo as 25–30 km (16–19 mi; 13–16 nmi); the captain remarked that something was wrong and the co-pilot said that the runway was not lit.

The crew radioed the Maputo controller and asked him to "check your runway lights". Around 21:21, the navigator stated the range to Maputo as 18–20 km (11–12 mi; 9.7–10.8 nmi), and the flight repeated its request to Maputo to check runway lights. Upon reaching an altitude of 796 metres (2,611 ft) AGL, the ground proximity warning system (GPWS) sounded and remained on and, although the captain cursed, the descent continued.

During the last 22 seconds of the flight, the crew twice more radioed Maputo about the runway lights, affirming that they were not in sight, which was eventually acknowledged by the Maputo controller. Meanwhile, the captain stated "cloudy, cloudy, cloudy" and the navigator exclaimed "no, no, there's nowhere to go, there's no NDBs, nothing!". The captain then added "Neither NDBs, nor ILS!", which were the last words recorded on the CVR. The aircraft first impacted terrain at 21:21:39, approximately 65 kilometres (40 mi; 35 nmi) west of Maputo in a hilly region at an elevation of 666 metres (2,185 ft). At the time of the accident, it was a very dark night, a few minutes before moonrise. The last weather report passed to the aircraft indicated 10 kilometres (5.4 nmi; 6.2 mi) of visibility with 3/8 cloud cover at 550 metres (1,800 ft).

=== Search and rescue ===
The aircraft struck hilly terrain and broke up, killing 34 of the 44 persons on-board

After being unable to contact the flight on the radio, the Maputo controller alerted authorities and the Mozambican military units prepared for search and rescue. Since the last radio communication with the aircraft had been four minutes before its estimated time of arrival, the initial search area was defined around Maputo. Throughout the rest of the night and early morning, many helictopers were out to search for the missing flight, and, in addition, a marine search of Maputo Bay was carried out, all without success.

The actual accident site was in a remote, inaccessible corner of South Africa, approximately 150 metres (500 ft) from the Mozambican border. The left wing hit a tree and the aircraft broke up before sliding down a hill, distributing the wreckage over a debris field 846 metres (2,776 ft) in length. A police officer was alerted at approximately 23:00 by a villager from Mbuzini, and the first responder to the scene was a member of the Komatipoort police station who arrived at 23:40. The first medical personnel reached the site at 01:00. Shortly after 04:00, a helicopter and medical crew from the South African Air Force Base Hoedspruit arrived and evacuated the survivors to Nelspruit hospital.

Of the five members of the flight crew, only the flight engineer survived. All four Mozambican cabin crew were killed, as were 26 of the 35 passengers. According to the autopsy conducted by a South African pathologist, Machel died instantly. Besides Machel, the dead included Marxist scholar and diplomat Aquino de Bragança, Machel's possible successor Fernando Honwana, press secretary Muradali Mamadhussein, photo-journalist Daniel Maquinasse, and transport minister Alcantara Santos. One survivor died 2 1/2 months after the crash from his injuries.

== Reactions ==
Pik Botha was alerted to the crash at 04:30 by a phone call from Minister Louis le Grange, who stated that Machel and 30-40 passengers on board had been killed. Pik Botha reported that he telephoned and informed State President P. W. Botha. Both of them agreed that, considering the sensitivity of the situation, Pik Botha should accompany officials investigating the crash site. At 06:50, South Africa first notified the Mozambican Government that a plane headed to Maputo had crashed in South African territory near the border.

The first public indication of the tragedy was when Radio Mozambique switched to funeral music at 08:30 and Marcelino dos Santos, a member of the ruling FRELIMO Party announced President Machel's aircraft had not returned to Maputo as scheduled the previous evening. Dos Santos said authorities were analyzing the situation and appealed for calm and vigilance. Mozambican security minister, Sérgio Vieira, traveled to Mbuzini with Pik Botha, and proceeded to the crash site and personally identified Machel's body.

FRELIMO issued a second communique that evening confirming Machel's death. It did not accuse South Africa directly, however it did suggest that the crash had been criminal in origin. While over the following days and weeks, Mozambican government officials would continue to refrain from overt statements of South African complicity, many other leaders in Africa stated outright that the apartheid government was responsible. Violence erupted in Harare, Zimbabwe, when cars driven by whites were attacked by angry demonstrators, prompting an editorial rebuke in Mozambique that declared that Machel had been committed to a non-racial Africa.

After lying in state at Maputo City Hall, Machel's funeral on 28 October was attended by more than 100 foreign delegations. Eulogized as a fighter who died in the struggle against apartheid, banners in the crowd made reference to South African involvement in the crash.

== Investigation ==
=== On site ===
On scene the South African police located and took custody of the cockpit voice recorder (CVR) and flight data recorder (FDR) (the aircraft was equipped with both digital and magnetic FDRs). According to Pik Botha, this was due to suspicions that they could be tampered with. Media access to the site was limited to a team from SABC-TV. Autopsies were conducted on only the four dead flight crew and three others and the bodies returned to Mozambique without the approval of the SACAA.

On arrival, Mozambican minister Sérgio Vieira asked for the documents that were taken from the aircraft to be handed to him. The South African commissioner of police, Petrus Johann Coetzee, had already made copies of these, and the documents were transferred to Vieira.

In accordance with the South African Air Control Act, aircraft accidents are required to be investigated by the SA Department of Transport. Thus, Pik Botha consulted Hendrik Schoeman of the Department of Transport, once Machel's death was confirmed. After Botha and Schoeman had visited the crash site, Botha cited special circumstances and other international protocols as reasons to become involved.

=== Cooperation ===
In a press conference on 6 November, Botha announced that a document retrieved from the plane revealed a Mozambican-Zimbabwean plot to topple the Malawian government. The three international teams signed a protocol of secrecy on 14 November 1986 as Botha's selective announcements were straining relations between the teams and governments. Nevertheless, Botha reported to Beeld newspaper on 24 November 1986 that he had listened to Maputo air traffic control's recordings and studied their transcription. He had acquired them from a foreign affairs representative in the South African team.

Director Renee van Zyl of the South African Civil Aviation Bureau served a writ on Botha and the SAP, and received the two recorders at 15:45 on 11 November 1986. On 24 October 1986, a 26-member Soviet and Mozambican delegation travelled from Maputo to Komatipoort to join the South African team investigating the crash. Eventually, agreement was reached for representatives of South Africa, Mozambique and the Soviet Union to jointly examine the CVR tapes under Swiss auspices in Zürich.

=== Board of Inquiry ===
==== Formation ====
According to South Africa, approaches were made to both the United States National Transportation Safety Board (NTSB) and the British Air Accidents Investigation Branch (AAIB) requesting official assistance in the investigation; however, both agencies were not willing to become involved on an individual basis. Pik Botha would later state that on his recommendation, due to the mounting suspicions of South African culpability in the crash, the services of three foreign individuals were obtained, and these persons became three of the six members of the Board of Inquiry. These individuals were: Frank Borman, an aeronautical engineer, former United States test pilot, astronaut and CEO of Eastern Air Lines, Geoffrey Wilkinson, former head of the British Department for Transport's Air Accidents Investigation Branch, and Sir Edward Eveleigh, former Lord Justice of Appeal and member of the British Privy Council.

The three South African board members included J.J.S. Germishuys, former South African Commissioner for Civil Aviation, and Pieter van Hoven, chairman of the Airlines Association of South Africa. The inquiry was chaired by Cecil Margo, a member of the South African Supreme Court who had participated in several other high-profile aircraft accident investigations previously. Board members participated in the earlier fact-finding portion of the investigation, and conducted public hearings at the Supreme Court in Johannesburg from 20 January until 26 January 1987. The board then adjourned to analyze the evidence and reach conclusions as to cause.

==== Analysis ====
The board concluded that the 37° turn was executed by the navigator using the autopilot's Doppler navigation mode, which when set maintained the desired heading while making corrections for wind drift. The navigator performed this turn after he saw the VOR signal indicating that the aircraft had intercepted the Maputo VOR 45° radial, the compass direction from Maputo on which the crew intended to turn and approach for a landing on runway 23. However, the turn actually put the aircraft on a path following a 45° radial from the VOR beacon at Matsapa Airport, Swaziland.

Discounting the possibility of a false VOR beacon, an analysis of which was included in an appendix, the board considered it probable that the flight crew had inadvertently set the first of two VOR receivers on board to the Matsapa VOR frequency. This error was made more likely by the poor design of the instruments, the absence of back lighting of the selected frequencies, the fact the two frequencies were unusually close, 112.7 MHz for Maputo and 112.3 MHz for Matsapa, and the similarity between the figures '7' and '3' on the Soviet instrumentation.

The board considered it "quite likely" that after the turn the captain re-tuned first VOR receiver to the ILS frequency, as the instrument was found in this state after the crash. For the final stages of flight, the aircraft was not following any VOR signal; instead the autopilot was tracking the 221° heading the navigator had set earlier during the turn. The post-accident settings of the second VOR receiver showed that it was displaying the aircraft's position relative to Maputo and was correctly set to the Maputo VOR frequency, but was apparently not being used to guide the autopilot nor was it being monitored by the crew.

The captain's initial erroneous assumption that Maputo had had an electrical blackout was never reconsidered by the crew, despite evidence to the contrary. Throughout the descent, the crew were in radio contact with the Maputo controller, who therefore had electrical power, and backup power generators were standard equipment for airport navigational aids. All the navigation aids at Maputo were determined by the board to be working at the time of the accident, although the aircraft was flying too far away and too low to receive the ILS and NDB signals. When announcing the distance remaining to Maputo, the navigator was apparently referring to the Doppler navigation system, which was not accurate, rather than the DME equipment available on board which correctly displayed the distance to the Maputo DME beacon.

The crew were criticised for failing to perform any checklist items or navigational aid identification, as well as for the distractions and non-essential conversations in the cockpit during the descent into Maputo. As a consequence of not announcing to the other crew members which navigational aids were being used, or the frequencies being set, mistakes could not be corrected by others through "cross-checking". Regarding it essential that the relatively large crew in the cockpit work as a well-integrated team, the board concluded that "demonstrably they had not".

The board found that use of non-standard phraseology between the Maputo controller and the crew led to confusion about the status of the ILS signal and whether the runway lights were on. The flight crew's repeated requests to "check runway lights" were interpreted by the controller, based on the use of the word 'check' in civil aviation, as confirmation by the crew that they had the runway lights in sight. The aircraft had not refueled at Mbala before departing and did not have enough fuel remaining to reach the intended alternative airport in Beira, Mozambique by the time it reached Maputo. This may have greatly increased the pressure on the crew to continue with the landing approach to Maputo despite the difficulties encountered.

Although the Maputo controller had specifically cleared the aircraft only to 910 metres (3,000 ft) and no lower until the runway lights were in sight, the descent continued below that height at a rate of 150 metres per minute (500 ft/min), without the runway lights visible, in darkness and partially cloudy conditions. The only reaction to the warning by the GPWS, which sounded for 32 seconds, was the captain exclaiming "Damn it!" and a very slight nose-up pitch of the aircraft. The board concluded that even just seconds before the impact, had the crew performed the required procedures for a GPWS alert when flying over hilly or unknown terrain, quickly raising the nose and increasing power, this would have prevented the crash. The captain was singled out for criticism by the board for the decision to continue the descent without any ground references and with the belief that all navigation aids at Maputo were not working, instead of climbing to the published minimum safe altitude for the Maputo area of 1,100 metres (3,600 ft) and verifying his position through other aids available, including his radar.

==== Findings ====
The board of inquiry determined that:

The cause of the accident was that the flight crew failed to follow procedural requirements for an instrument let-down approach, but continued to descend under visual flight rules in darkness and some cloud, i.e. without having some contact with the ground, below minimum safe altitude and minimum assigned altitude, and in addition ignored the GPWS alarm.

In addition, the board issued five safety recommendations which covered the use of and recurrent training in approved terminology in ATC communications for both ground and flight crews, monitoring of crew compliance with established procedures, a proposal that CVRs retain a record of the last hour of flight, rather than the standard of 30 minutes, and the importance of maintaining navigational aids to international standards.

The report was endorsed unanimously by the six members of the board and submitted to the South African Minister of Transport Affairs on 2 July 1987.

=== Mozambican submission ===
The Mozambican delegation, representing the State of registry of the aircraft, had a right by international treaty to review a draft of the report and submit their comments for consideration. The Mozambican team provided 11 pages of suggested corrections to the draft, some of which were adopted by the Board. In their submission, the Mozambican delegation stated that according to the survivors the South African Police searched the aircraft for documents rather than tending to the injured passengers.

Mozambique also provided a technical report prepared by Ron Chippindale of the New Zealand Office of Air Accidents Investigations examining the possibility of tampering with or replacing the genuine Maputo VOR signal with a decoy. His conclusions were that it would be "simple" to set up a mobile VOR. However, in order to effectively replace the genuine signal, the Maputo VOR would have to be turned off.

The Mozambican analysis of and findings from the evidence led them to conclude:

- The accident resulted from a critical situation which originated from the right turn away from the planned route.
- No explanation for the deviation was agreed upon by the three countries, and there was new evidence from the USSR that the aircraft turned to follow a false signal.
- The discrepancies from procedure of the Maputo controller and flight crew were not the main causes of the accident.
- The investigation should be continued in order to determine the origin of the VOR signal.

=== Soviet submission ===
The Soviet Union, the state of manufacture of the aircraft, was given a draft of the final report and a chance to review and submit comments in accordance with ICAO convention. In their remarks, the Soviet Union reiterated their endorsement of the previously agreed upon factual information contained in the draft. However, regarding the analysis, conclusions and recommendations that followed, the Soviets stated the basic task of the investigation should be to determine the reasons for the 37° turn, which "remained unsolved in the report", and that conclusions of the draft based on the crew's errors were "totally ungrounded". They ended their remarks with a full rejection of the draft, calling it "worthless", and instead offering their own analysis and conclusions.

The Soviet delegation stated the theory that the crew had mistakenly selected the Matsapa VOR was contradicted by the known settings of the onboard navigation equipment and the timing of the turn. They said that the data recovered from the magnetic flight data recorder did not correspond to the path of an aircraft following the signal from the Matsapa VOR. The Soviet team submitted a technical report to support their belief the Matsapa VOR's signal was not strong enough at the point of the turn for the navigation equipment on board the aircraft to receive it effectively, and further that the flight was below the coverage of the VOR, meaning that the signal from the Matsapa VOR could not have been the cause of the deviation.

According to the Soviets, the other navigational aids at Maputo were not strong enough to reach the aircraft and were of no help to the flight crew. A LAM Airlines Boeing 737 flying at around the same time as the accident aircraft reported receiving the Maputo VOR signal unusually early, at a distance of about 350 kilometres (220 mi; 190 nmi). The Soviets stated that this was actually the false decoy beacon that was working with a higher signal level that the actual Maputo VOR.

The Soviets stated that there was an earlier ground proximity warning system (GPWS) alert about 4 1/2 minutes before impact which was triggered by the signal from the decoy VOR beacon, and this false alert was interpreted by the flight crew as a systems fault in the GPWS. Receipt by the flight crew of the visual landing clearance from the Maputo controller implied permission to descend below 910 metres (3,000 ft) according to ICAO procedures. When the GPWS sounded shortly before impact the crew, doubting its reliability, disregarded it as false, and believing they were over the low terrain continued their descent.

The Soviets concluded that:

- The aircraft's equipment performed with the required accuracy for a safe flight.
- The crew's qualifications and experience excluded the possibility that the deviation off course was as result of unpreparedness or unattentiveness. The crew were efficient in monitoring the aircraft and maintaining contact with the Maputo air traffic controller up until the moment of impact.
- The crew and controller were prepared for an ILS approach to runway 23, however 96 kilometres (60 mi; 52 nmi) away from Maputo the aircraft turned 37° to the right. This turn was a result of a false VOR signal situated beyond the limit of Maputo airport, and resulted in the aeroplane being led into hilly ground and its collision with terrain. This signal, also received by a LAM Airlines Boeing 737, was the result of a premeditated action.
- The weather conditions along the route, at Maputo airport and at the alternative airport did not hamper the flight and was not a cause of the outcome.

== Conspiracy theories and subsequent investigations ==
=== Claims of a decoy beacon ===
Suspicion of a false beacon in the Lebombos mountains was first expressed by South African helicopter pilots on the morning following the crash, followed by a similar suggestion in an anonymous call to UPI by a supposed SAAF officer, a day later. The pilots' speculative remark was revealed to Sérgio Vieira, Mozambique's minister of security, in a rash comment by South African police commissioner Johann Coetzee. Neither the Mozambican or Russian teams however, nor any witness testimony given, supplied any evidence or direct allegation concerning a secondary beacon to the Margo commission. The Margo commission's draft report then proposed Matsapa airfield's VOR, combined with pilot error, as playing a likely role in the trajectory followed by the aircraft. The USSR delegation disputed this, saying the signal was obscured by mountains.

A breakdown in communications followed, causing General Earp of the South African Air Force to authorise military pilots to penetrate Mozambique airspace to test the Matsapa theory. They returned with confirmation, though the final report relied on additional testimonies of commercial pilots who flew on C9-CAA's track. They likewise confirmed clear VOR signals from Matsapa. Mozambican pilot Dias, who supported the Matsapa theory, illustrated his interpretation of events to Mozambican officials on a flight from Lisbon to Maputo. However, Mozambican authorities remained unconvinced and suspended air controller de Jesus on 5 May 1998, for allegedly having been bribed to tamper with Maputo airport's beacon on the night of the crash.

=== TRC report 2001 ===
A special investigation into Machel's death was carried out by the Truth and Reconciliation Commission (TRC). The report, published in 2001, is available on the T&RC website volume 2-page 494. It was found that "The investigations conducted by the Commission raised a number of questions, including the possibility of a false beacon and the absence of a warning from the South African authorities. The matter requires further investigation by an appropriate structure."

The TRC investigation took place in camera and without any aviation specialist being present. The testimony was further led by a prominent radio journalist rather than a judge. The TRC's investigation did not find conclusive evidence to support or refute either of the earlier reports. Nonetheless, some pieces of circumstantial evidence collected by the TRC contradicted a number of the Margo Commission's findings:

- A former Military Intelligence (MI) officer "Ben" alleged that Pik Botha and a number of high-ranking security officials held a meeting on 18 October 1986 at Skwamans, a secret security police base shared with MI operatives halfway between Mbuzini and Komatipoort, on the day before the crash. They left late that night in a small plane and some, including Pik Botha, returned there after the crash.
- C9-CAA entered a military and operational zone in South Africa (a restricted airspace, which was presumed to be under radar surveillance.) However, no warning that the plane was off course or in South African airspace was given to the aircraft.
- South Africa's State Security Council (SSC) minutes from January 1984 indicate that the Mozambican working group, including General Jac Buchner and Major Craig Williamson, discussed how to help RENAMO overthrow the FRELIMO government of Mozambique.

The TRC report concluded that the questions of a false beacon and the absence of a warning from the South African authorities require "further investigation by an appropriate structure".

A police video in the TRC's possession shows South African foreign minister Pik Botha telling journalists at the crash site that President Machel and others killed in the crash were his and President P. W. Botha's "very good friends", and that their deaths were a tragedy for South Africa.

=== Confession by Hans Louw ===
In January 2003, the Sowetan Sunday World reported that an apartheid era killer and former CCB member, Hans Louw, serving a 28-year term at Baviaanspoort Prison near Pretoria, South Africa, had confessed to participating in a plot to kill Machel. A false radio navigational beacon would have been used to lure the aircraft off course, with Louw forming part of an alleged backup team to shoot the aircraft down if it did not crash. The newspaper also alleged that another of the plotters, former Rhodesian Selous Scout, Edwin Mudingi, supported Louw's claim. However, after an investigation by the Scorpions, a South African special police unit, it was reported in July 2003 and in October 2008 that they could find no evidence for South African complicity.

In a television documentary written and produced by South African TV journalist Johann Abrahams, Louw says: "So, when the plane reached that hill it was already lower than 1,000 feet [300 m]. And the wheels to prepare to land was (sic) already out. So the pilots that night 22 years ago, thought they were landing in Mozambique." ("The Death of Samora Machel" in SABC "Special Assignment" program broadcast on 7 October 2008.)

However, based on the agreed Aircraft Accident Factual Report, signed by South Africa, Mozambique and the USSR on 16 January 1987, the Report of the official Board of inquiry notes that "...the aircraft struck the ground in the flight configuration, with landing gear and flaps retracted and the stabilizer in the cruise position".

The final words of the captain and navigator spoken three seconds before impact contradict Louw’s assumption that the pilots “thought they were landing in Mozambique":

“NAVIGATOR: NO, NO, THERE’S NOWHERE TO GO, NO NDBs, THERE IS NOTHING.

CAPTAIN: NEITHER NDBs, NOR ILS.” [2]: 130

=== 2006 inquiry ===
South African Minister of Safety and Security, Charles Nqakula announced on 2 February 2006 that the Machel death crash inquiry would be reopened. He told reporters in Parliament that all of South Africa's law enforcement agencies were expected to be involved in the probe, in co-operation with their Mozambican counterparts. In October 2006, the enquiry was expected to "be wrapped up before the end of the year" but there seems to be no further information available.

== Aftermath ==
=== 1996 anniversary ===
A Mbuzini wreath laying ceremony on 17 October 1986 was attended by Graça Machel and addressed by Nelson Mandela. Mandela declared the initial simple memorial a South African national monument and hailed Machel as a universal hero whose life exemplified the highest ideals of internationalism and universality. Mandela cautiously claimed that the precise chain of events leading to Machel's death were uncertain and elusive, and repeated an earlier promise that no stone would be left unturned to establish the full truth.

=== 1999 monument ===
A Samora Machel Monument was erected at the crash site. Designed by Mozambican architect, Jose Forjaz, at a cost to the South African government of 1.5 million Rand (US$300,000), the monument comprises 35 whistling wind pipes to symbolise each of the lives lost in the accident. It was inaugurated on 19 January 1999 by Nelson Mandela, his wife Graça, and by President Joaquim Chissano of Mozambique.

=== 2006 anniversary ===
At the 20th anniversary of the crash, on 19 October 2006, South African president Thabo Mbeki declared the memorial a national heritage site. Leading up to the event, Mozambican president Armando Guebuza, who chaired the Mozambican inquiry in 1986, repeated a commitment to discover the truth about the incident, while President Mbeki, in his state of the nation address of 3 February 2006, mentioned that a satisfactory explanation was still lacking. In November 2006, Jacob Zuma, then ANC deputy president, said that Machel's death was unusual.

=== Nelson Mandela's and Graça Machel's accusations ===
At the Mandela-Machel wedding ceremony on 18 July 1998, Mandela was reported to have announced that Samora Machel was murdered, without reference to the South African board of enquiry's findings. Graça Machel believes this crash was no accident and attempted to track down her late husband's alleged killers. In May 1999, Graça Machel said in an interview on SABC TV's News Maker programme that she remained convinced the apartheid government was responsible, and challenged former foreign minister Pik Botha to "come clean" about Samora Machel's death. Botha responded in a public interview on 16 May 1999 that although he had been one of the first people on the scene and was called on to identify Machel's body, the only facts he knew about the crash were the findings of the Margo Commission:

"I totally reject any suggestion that I could have been a party to a decision of that nature. It is an extremely sad moment for me. - Pik Botha

=== Economic impact ===
A study in the Quarterly Journal of Economics reached the conclusions that the crash had immediate wider repercussions for Mozambique's economy. An annual 7.7% decline in GDP under Machel's communist nationalisation policies, reverted to growth averaging 2.4% per annum under the freer, multi-party democracy in the tenure of his successor, Joaquim Chissano.

== Further reading and external links ==
- A Morte de Samora Machel, João M. Cabrita, 2005. Novafrica, Maputo
- Clayburn, Yvonne (1989). Soviet disinformation strategy as applied to Samora Machel death crash. Institut für Afrikanische und Internationale Studien.
- Young, Mark D., "The Samora Machel plane crash re-examined." News article 2014
- Photos of C9-CAA at Airliners.net
