= Samora Machel Monument =

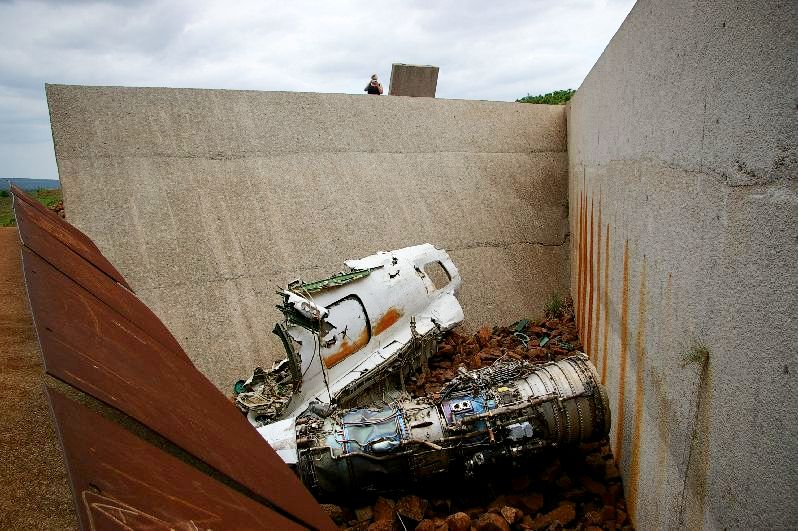
- Remains of the plane wreck
- Interactive map of Samora Machel Monument
- Location: Mbuzini, South Africa
- Coordinates: 25.9161°S 31.9552°E
- Designer: José Forjaz
- Completion date: January 1999
- Dedicated to: Samora Machel

The Samora Machel Monument in Mbuzini, near Komatipoort in the Mpumalanga province of South Africa, marks the spot where the plane carrying the then-President of Mozambique crashed in 1986. It resulted in the death of President Machel and several Mozambican ministers. It was declared a National Heritage Site in 2006.

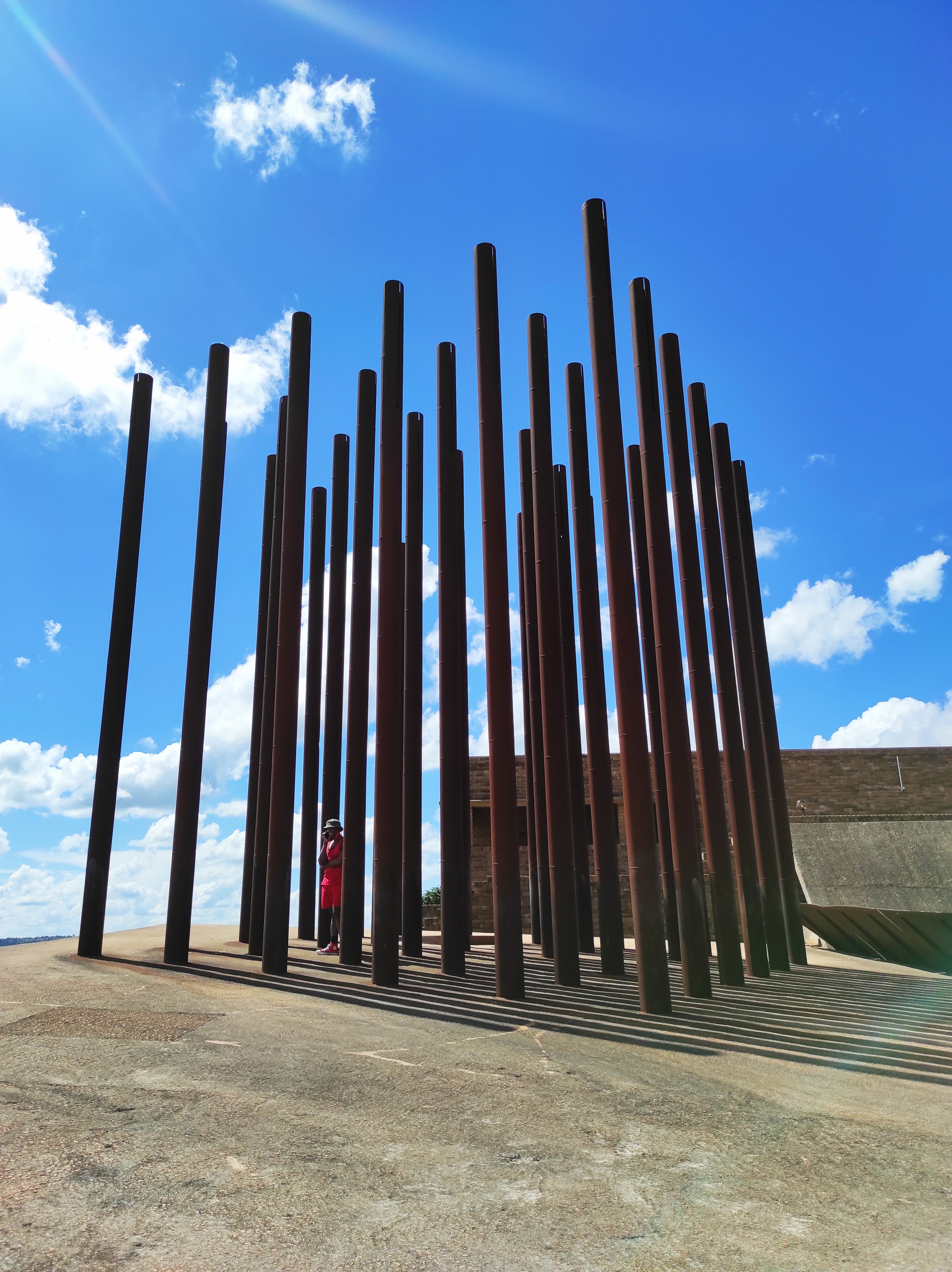
Art installation at the Samora Machel Monument

The monument was inaugurated by Joaquim Chissano and Nelson Mandela on 19 January 1999. It was constructed at a cost of $240,000 and incorporates some of the wreckage of the plane. Its central feature is 35 tubes of steel, symbolising the number of lives lost in the air crash, that create a wailing sound in the wind.

A planned R11.2 million upgrade was to add access roads, an amphitheater, a helipad and buildings. In 2006 a nearby library with a collection of books in English and Portuguese was opened. A statue of Machel, donated by Norwegian anti-apartheid artists, was also erected at the site.
