= Komatipoort =

- Town
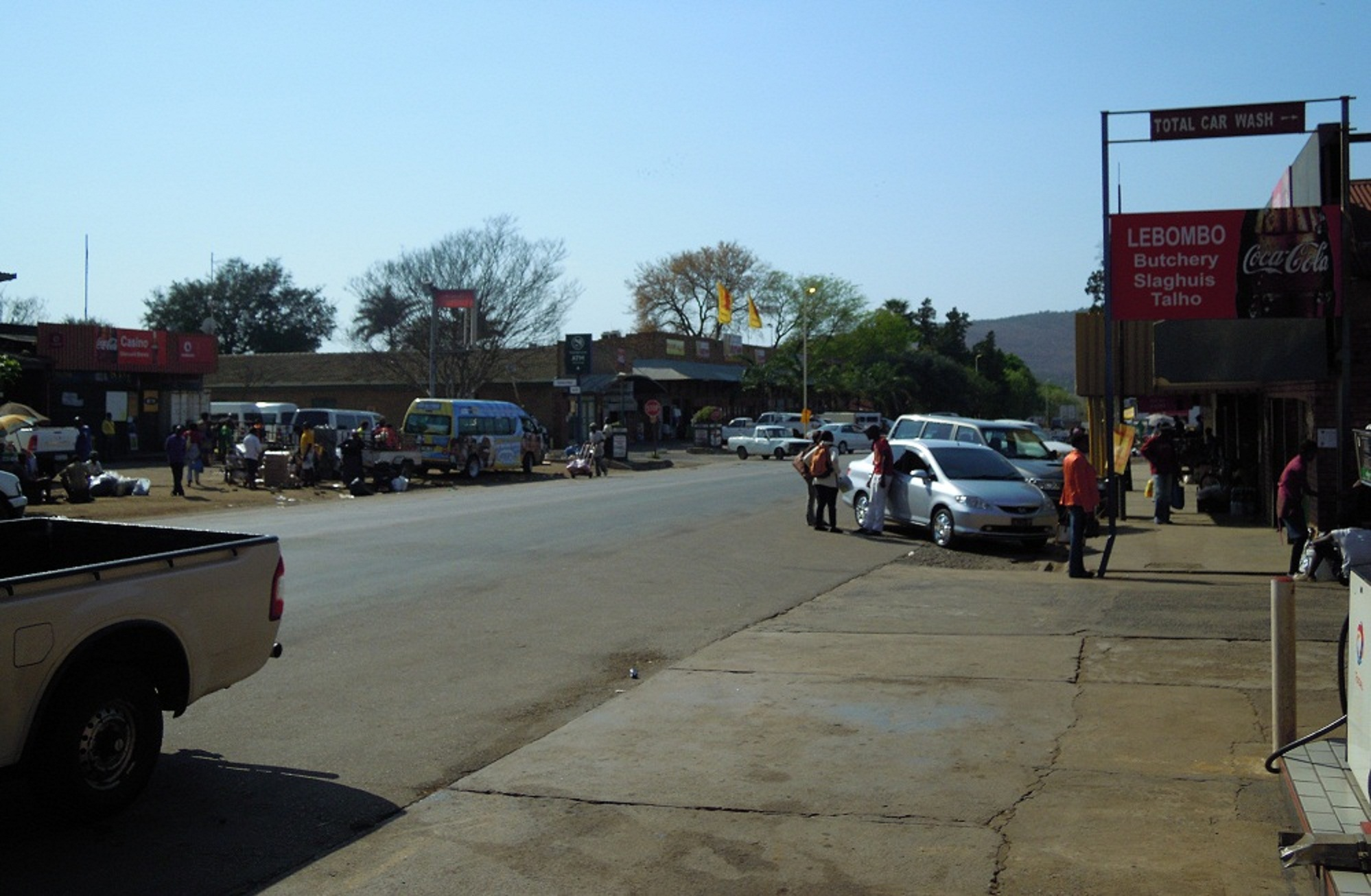
- A street in Komatipoort

- Location within Mpumalanga Location within South Africa Location within Africa
- Coordinates: 25°26′S 31°57′E
- Country: South Africa
- Province: Mpumalanga
- District: Ehlanzeni
- Municipality: Nkomazi

Area
  - Total: 11.71 km^{2} (4.52 sq mi)

Population (2011)
  - Total: 4,683
  - Density: 399.9/km^{2} (1,036/sq mi)

Racial makeup (2011)
  - Black African: 61.0%
  - Coloured: 1.2%
  - Indian/Asian: 2.8%
  - White: 34.4%
  - Other: 0.6%

First languages (2011)
  - Afrikaans: 30.8%
  - Tsonga: 28.4%
  - Swazi: 27.7%
  - English: 7.6%
  - Other: 5.5%
- Time zone: UTC+2 (SAST)
- Postal code (street): 1340
- PO box: 1340
- Area code: 013

Komatipoort is a town situated at the confluence of the Crocodile and Komati Rivers in Mpumalanga province, South Africa. The town is 8 km from the Crocodile Bridge Gate into the Kruger National Park, just 3 km from the Mozambique border and 65 km from the Eswatini border.

It is a small, quiet town within the Lowveld with some attractive tree-lined streets. It is one of the hottest towns in South Africa where temperatures can reach almost 48 °C (47.7 °C (117.9 °F) on 12 December 1944) in the height of summer, but also with a perfect winter climate around 24 °C (75 °F).

== History ==
'Komati' also takes its name from Khoekhoe, one of RSA's first languages, referring to the once wealthy cattle owners on this land, with 'koma' meaning cows and 'ti' meaning my.

'Komati' takes its name from the Komati River whose original native Swazi name is Nkomazi, translated as "river of cows". It is where the Crocodile and Komati Rivers meet to flow through the 'Poort' (mountain pass) through the Lebombo Mountains into Mozambique.

In the 1890s Komatipoort was a wild and uproarious construction camp for the railway being built from Lourenco Marques (modern Maputo). Conditions were not the best with the area gripped by a malaria epidemic; it was in the zone called 'fever country'.

Komatipoort was the last stop in the South African Republic (ZAR) Pretoria - Delagoa Bay Line constructed by the Netherlands-South African Railway Company (NZASM) with the first train crossing the border at Komatipoort from the ZAR to Portuguese East Africa on 1 July 1891 after the completion of the rail bridge over the Komati River.

Between 1900 and 1902 during the Anglo/Boer War, the town was used as a base by Major F. Von Steinaecker and his group known as 'Steinaecker's Horse'. They were a bunch of mercenaries and bushwhackers and were recruited by the British in order to fight Boer guerrillas in the bushveld.

Near Komatipoort is the site where the former Mozambique's President Samora Machel died in a plane crash at Mbuzini village in the Lebombo mountain, the natural barrier between South Africa and Mozambique. At the site of the accident stands the Samora Machel Monument.

The Nkomati Accord was signed in Komatipoort in 1984.

== Infrastructure ==
This town has a railway station for the loading and unloading of passengers and cargo on the Pretoria–Maputo railway.

The town is the site of a dry port.

== See also ==
- Railway stations in Mozambique
