= Nkomati Accord =

1984 treaty between South Africa and Mozambique

Agreement on Non-Aggression and Good Neighbourliness between Mozambique and South Africa
- Type: Non-aggression
- Context: Cold War
- Signed: 13 March 1984; 42 years ago
- Location: Komatipoort, South Africa
- Signatories: P. W. Botha _{(Prime Minister of South Africa)}; Samora Machel _{(President of Mozambique})
- Parties: South Africa; Mozambique
- Languages: Portuguese; English

The Nkomati Accord (officially known as the Agreement on Non-Aggression and Good Neighbourliness between Mozambique and South Africa ) was a non-aggression pact signed on 16 March 1984 between the People's Republic of Mozambique and the Republic of South Africa. The event took place at the South African town of Komatipoort with the signatories being President of Mozambique Samora Machel and Prime Minister of South Africa P.W. Botha. The treaty's stated focus was on preventing Mozambique from supporting the African National Congress to undertake violent actions in South Africa, and for South Africa to stop supplying the RENAMO movement in Mozambique.

The treaty was met with disapproval from members of the SADCC and particularly from the ANC who were aware of the impacts it would have on their liberation struggle. Despite this, both groups acknowledged that Mozambique had essentially been forced into signing the treaty as the country was on the brink of destruction due to the conflict with the South-African backed RENAMO rebels.

Mozambique stood by its side of the Treaty and expelled ANC members from the south of the country, meanwhile the South Africans ignored the deal and stepped up their already extensive support to RENAMO. Captured documents from the main Gorongosa base in 1985 revealed that the South Africans had continued their support in violation of the accord. A permanent peace accord, the Rome General Peace Accords, finally ended the Mozambican Civil War in 1992 and was supervised by the United Nations' ONUMOZ force until 1994.
