= Mbuzini =

- Location within Mpumalanga Location within South Africa
- Coordinates: 25°56′S 31°56′E
- Country: South Africa
- Province: Mpumalanga
- District: Ehlanzeni
- Municipality: Nkomazi

Area
  - Total: 8.71 km^{2} (3.36 sq mi)

Population (2001)
  - Total: 9,070
  - Density: 1,040/km^{2} (2,700/sq mi)
- Time zone: UTC+2 (SAST)

Mbuzini is a village in the Mpumalanga province of South Africa. Situated near the borders with Mozambique and Eswatini, it is the village where Mozambican president, Samora Machel, and 34 other passengers died in an aeroplane crash in 1986. A memorial service is held every year on 19 October at the site of the crash, which features a monument to the event.
