= Arménio Ferreira =

Angolan physician

Arménio Ferreira is a former Angolan physician of Portuguese descent. Ferreira was the personal physician and unofficial advisor of Angolan President Agostinho Neto.
