= Samora Machel =

President of Mozambique from 1975 to 1986

His Excellency Samora Machel
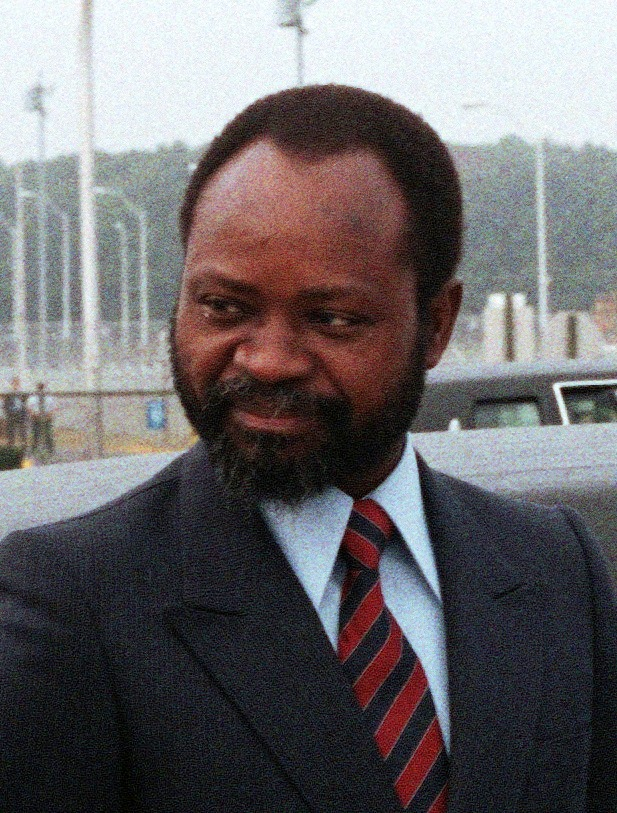
- Machel in 1985

1st President of Mozambique
- In office June 25, 1975 – October 19, 1986
- Prime Minister: Mário da Graça Machungo (1986)
- Preceded by: Office established
- Succeeded by: Joaquim Chissano

President of the Mozambique Liberation Front
- In office May 14, 1970 – October 19, 1986
- Vice President: Marcelino dos Santos (1970–1977)
- Preceded by: Eduardo Mondlane
- Succeeded by: Joaquim Chissano

Personal details
- Born: Samora Moisés Machel; September 29, 1933 Gaza Province, Portuguese Mozambique
- Died: October 19, 1986 (aged 53) Mbuzini, Transvaal, South Africa
- Cause of death: Plane crash
- Party: FRELIMO
- Spouses: Josina Abiatar Muthemba (m. 1969; died 1971) Graça Simbine (m. 1975)
- Children: 8, including Josina

Samora Moisés Machel (September 29, 1933 – October 19, 1986) was a Mozambican politician and revolutionary who served as the first President of Mozambique from the country's independence in 1975 until his death in the 1986 Mozambican Tupolev Tu-134 plane crash which killed 34 people, including several Mozambican ministers and government officials. Machel was a socialist in the tradition of Marxism–Leninism.

== Early life ==
Samora Moisés Machel was born on September 29, 1933, in the village of Madragoa (today's Chilembene), Gaza Province, Mozambique, to a family of farmers. His grandfather had been an active collaborator of Gungunhana. Under Portuguese rule, his father, like most Black Mozambicans, was classified as "indígena" (native). He was forced to accept lower prices for his crops than White farmers; compelled to grow labour-intensive cotton, which took time away from the food crops needed for his family; and forbidden to brand his mark on his cattle to prevent thievery. Despite these barriers, Machel's father was a successful farmer who owned four plows and 400 head of cattle by 1940. Machel grew up in this farming village and attended mission elementary school. In 1942, he was sent to school in the town of Zonguene in Gaza Province. The school was run by Catholic missionaries who educated the children in Portuguese language and culture. Although having completed the fourth grade, Machel never completed his secondary education. However, he had the prerequisite certificate to train as a nurse anywhere in Portugal at the time, since the nursing schools were not degree-conferring institutions.

Machel started to study nursing in the capital city of Lourenço Marques (today Maputo), beginning in 1954. In the 1950s, he saw some of the fertile lands around his farming community on the Limpopo River appropriated by the provincial government and worked by White settlers who developed a wide range of new infrastructure for the region. Like many other Mozambicans near the southern border of Mozambique, some of his relatives went to work in the South African mines where additional job opportunities were found. Shortly afterwards, one of his brothers was killed in a mining accident. Unable to complete formal training at the Miguel Bombarda Hospital in Lourenço Marques, he got a job working as an aide in the same hospital and earned enough to continue his education at night school. He worked at the hospital until he left the country to join the Mozambican nationalist struggle in neighbouring Tanzania.

== Independence struggle ==
Machel was attracted to anti-colonial ideals and began his political activities in the Miguel Bombarda hospital in Lourenço Marques (Maputo), where he protested against the fact that black nurses were paid less than whites doing the same job. Machel decided to leave Lourenço Marques when a white anti-fascist, the pharmaceutical representative João Ferreira, warned him that he was being watched by the Portuguese political police, the PIDE. Slipping across the border, he made his way to join FRELIMO in Dar es Salaam, via Swaziland, South Africa and Botswana. In Botswana, he hitched a lift on a plane carrying recruits of the African National Congress (ANC) of South Africa to Tanzania. Impressed by the young Mozambican, a senior ANC official J. B. Marks (according to Joe Slovo) bumped one of the ANC recruits off the flight to let Machel on.

In Dar es Salaam, Machel volunteered for military service, and was one of the second group of FRELIMO guerrillas sent for training in Algeria. Back in Tanzania, he was put in charge of FRELIMO's own training camp, at Kongwa. After FRELIMO launched the independence war, on September 25, 1964, Machel soon became a key commander, making his name in particular in the grueling conditions of the eastern area of the vast and sparsely populated province of Niassa. He rapidly rose through the ranks of the guerrilla army, the FPLM, and became the head of the army after the death of its first commander, Filipe Samuel Magaia, in October 1966.

Frelimo's founder and first president, Eduardo Mondlane, was assassinated by a parcel bomb on February 3, 1969. His deputy, Rev Uria Simango, expected to take over – but instead the FRELIMO Executive Committee appointed a presidential triumvirate, consisting of Simango, Machel and veteran nationalist and poet Marcelino dos Santos. Simango soon broke ranks, and denounced the rest of the FRELIMO leadership in the pamphlet “Gloomy Situation in Frelimo”. This led to Simango's expulsion from the liberation front, and the election, in 1970, of Machel as Frelimo President, with dos Santos as Deputy President.

Like the late Mondlane, Machel identified himself with Marxism–Leninism, and under his leadership these positions became central to FRELIMO, which evolved from a broad front into a more Marxist party.

The new commander of the Portuguese army in Mozambique, Gen. Kaúlza de Arriaga, boasted that he would eliminate FRELIMO in a few months. He launched the largest offensive of Portugal's colonial wars, Operation Gordian Knot, in 1970, concentrating on what was regarded as the FRELIMO heartland of Cabo Delgado in the far north. Kaúlza de Arriaga boasted of destroying a large number of guerrilla bases – but since such a base was just a collection of huts, the military significance of such supposed victories was dubious. Machel reacted by shifting the focus of the war elsewhere, stepping up FRELIMO operations in the western province of Tete. This was where a massive dam was being built at Cahora Bassa, on the Zambezi, to sell electricity to South Africa. Fearful that FRELIMO would attack the dam site, the Portuguese set up three concentric rings of defence around Cahora Bassa. This denuded the rest of Tete province of troops, and in 1972 FRELIMO crossed the Zambezi, striking further and further south. By 1973, FRELIMO units were operating in Manica and Sofala Province and began to hit the railway from Rhodesia to Beira, causing panic among the settler population of Beira, who accused the Portuguese army of not doing enough to defend white interests.

The end came suddenly. On April 25, 1974, Portuguese officers, tired of fighting three unwinnable wars in Africa, overthrew the government in Lisbon. The coup was almost bloodless. Nobody came onto the streets to defend Prime Minister Marcelo Caetano. Within 24 hours, the Armed Forces Movement (MFA) was in full control of Portugal.

== Independence ==
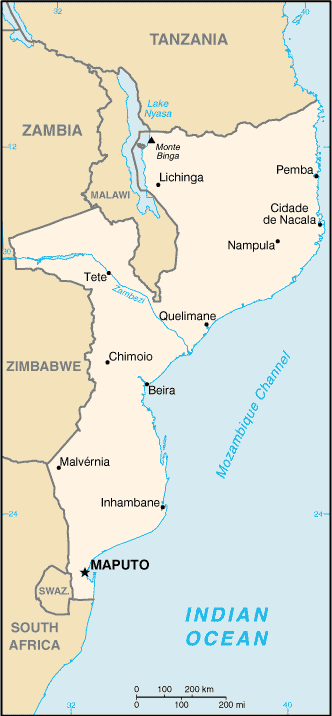
Independent Mozambique with Maputo as capital

Frelimo's immediate warning was that there was no such thing as democratic colonialism, and that nobody should imagine that Mozambicans would tolerate Portuguese rule just because there had been a change of government in Lisbon. Frelimo's fears were well-founded. The MFA allowed General António de Spínola to become the first post-coup President. He had been commander of the Portuguese forces in Guinea-Bissau, then Portuguese Guinea, and was believed to be deeply implicated in the assassination of the Guinean nationalist leader, Amílcar Cabral.

Spinola had no intention of letting Mozambique and Angola go. He dreamed of a Lusophone commonwealth run from Lisbon, and wanted a referendum on independence. Machel rejected such plans with the pithy remark: "You don't ask a slave if he wants to be free, particularly when he is already in revolt, and much less if you happen to be a slave-owner".

Initial discussions between Frelimo and the new Portuguese government, held in Lusaka in June 1974, proved fruitless. It was clear to Machel that the Portuguese foreign minister, Socialist Party leader Mário Soares, had no power to negotiate independence. So Machel sent one of his top advisers, Aquino de Bragança, to Lisbon to find out who really held power in Portugal. His answer was that Frelimo should really be talking to the MFA, particular to military intellectuals such as Col. Ernesto Melo Antunes, whose power was on the rise, as that of Spinola waned.

Machel refused to give the Portuguese the ceasefire they wanted. For as long as there was no commitment to Mozambican independence, the war would continue. Frelimo re-opened its front in Zambezia province, and stepped up operations throughout the war zone. There was little resistance. Following the collapse of the Caetano government, rank and file Portuguese soldiers saw little point in continuing to fight, preferring to stay in their barracks.

More serious talks between the Lisbon government and Frelimo ensued, and this time the MFA played a dominant role. The result was an agreement, signed in Lusaka on September 7, 1974, which agreed to transfer full power to Frelimo with the date for independence set for June 25, 1975. That day there was a short-lived settler revolt against the agreement, put down within a day by Portuguese and Frelimo troops acting jointly. A transitional government was set up, containing ministers appointed by both Frelimo and Portugal, but headed by Frelimo's Joaquim Chissano as Prime Minister. Machel continued to run Frelimo from Tanzania. He returned home triumphantly, in a journey "from the Rovuma to the Maputo" (the rivers marking the northern and southern boundaries of the country), in which he addressed rallies in every major population centre in the country.

The journey was interrupted at the beach resort of Tofo, in Inhambane Province, for a meeting of the Frelimo Central Committee, which drew up Mozambique's first Constitution. This gave the outline of the one-party, socialist state which Frelimo intended to establish. Frelimo was constitutionally the leading force in Mozambican society, and the President of Frelimo would automatically be President of Mozambique. On June 25, 1975, Machel proclaimed "the total and complete independence of Mozambique and its constitution into the People's Republic of Mozambique". This, he said, would be "a state of People's Democracy, in which, under the leadership of the worker-peasant alliance, all patriotic strata commit themselves to the destruction of the sequels of colonialism, and to annihilate the system of exploitation of man by man".

Machel's government moved quickly to bring key areas under state control. All land was nationalized – individuals and institutions could not hold land, but leased it from the state. On July 24, 1975, just a month after independence, all health and education institutions were nationalized. National health and education services were set up, and all private schools and clinics were abolished. The Catholic Church immediately lost the privileged position it had held in these areas. On February 3, 1976, the government nationalized all rented housing. “Landlords? What do we want landlords for in our country for?”, asked Machel at the rally announcing the measure. Private ownership of houses was not banned. Anyone, Mozambican or foreign, could own a house for their own use - but building private property for rent was forbidden. This changed the face of Mozambican cities – black Mozambicans moved from the suburbs into blocks in the centre of the cities, occupying houses and flats, once owned by Portuguese landlords, and many of which had now been abandoned.

In February 1977, at its 3rd Congress, Frelimo declared that it was now a Marxist–Leninist party, dedicated to the building of socialism, based on the “worker-peasant alliance”. The Congress re-elected Machel as President of Frelimo, and thus automatically as President of the Republic.

Frelimo was reorganized into celulas (“branches”) throughout the county. The party was to be a Leninist vanguard, and state institutions, at whatever level, were to be subordinate to the party. In 1978 elections were held. Since this was a one-party state, there was no organized opposition. Instead, candidates were presented by Frelimo at meetings – and were sometimes rejected when people complained of offences ranging from wife-beating and drunkenness to acting as an informer for the PIDE during the colonial government.

Frelimo faced a hostile environment, with the white minority governments of Ian Smith's Rhodesia and apartheid South Africa on Mozambique's borders. In March 1976, Machel's government implemented United Nations sanctions against the Smith government, and closed the borders with Rhodesia. In retaliation, Smith's Central Intelligence Organisation (CIO) recruited dissatisfied Mozambicans and former Portuguese settlers and helped set up an anti-Frelimo movement. Initially this “Mozambique National Resistance” operated as an auxiliary branch of the Rhodesian armed forces. Frelimo dismissed them as “armed bandits”.

As part of the measures accompanying the new Frelimo government, Machel introduced "reeducation centers" in which petty criminals, political opponents, and alleged anti-social elements such as prostitutes and drug users were imprisoned, often without trial. The conditions in these centers were harsh. Although there is a lack of reliable figures, Benedito Machava estimated that over a thousand inmates may have died due to starvation, disease, punishments or execution. In discussing Machel's role, Machava stated that the president took on a "salvationist stance", influenced both by Christianity and Maoism, which led him to believe in the beneficial effects of reeducation for enforcing his vision of social and moral purity. Despite the abuses and harsh conditions, there was also an emphasis on rehabilitation. For example, in 1979–80, three reeducation centers were closed, leading to the reintegration of 2600 former inmates (including hundreds of "political offenders") into society. In an October 1981 speech, Machel himself acknowledged and criticized the existence of lengthy arbitrary detentions.

However, Machel was unapologetic about the repression of dissidents inside and outside FRELIMO. In 1975, he had made a public appearance at the Nachingwea military camp for a lengthy show trial of former FRELIMO militants who had opposed the party's power consolidation, including Paulo Gumane and Uria Simango. Under pressure, the captives confessed to a variety of serious crimes. They are presumed to have been executed sometime in the years that followed; according to a 1995 report by Jose Pinto de Sa and Nelson Saute, they were burned alive by a convoy of soldiers in 1977.

== Rhodesian Bush War ==
Frelimo had longstanding links with Zimbabwean nationalist movements. Even during the independence war, guerrillas of ZANLA (Zimbabwe African National Liberation Army), the armed wing of ZANU (Zimbabwe African National Union), were able to operate from Frelimo-held areas in Tete province into northern areas of Rhodesia. After the implementation of the UN sanctions against the Rhodesian government, the entire length of the border was now available for nationalist incursions into Rhodesia.

ZANU leader Robert Mugabe, released from Salisbury Prison, Rhodesia in 1974, made his way into Mozambique the following year. Initially, Machel was suspicious of the apparent coup within ZANU that had brought Mugabe to power, and he was effectively rusticated to the central city of Quelimane, where he taught English. Tired of the divisions within Zimbabwean nationalism, Machel sponsored an alternative to both ZANU and its rival ZAPU. This was the Zimbabwean People's Army (ZIPA), which took credit for many operations in eastern Zimbabwe, and was enthusiastically promoted by the Mozambican media. But it soon turned out that the dominant force within ZIPA were ZANLA guerrillas who had never abandoned their loyalty to ZANU and to Mugabe.

Machel accepted the reality that the people doing most of the fighting in Zimbabwe were ZANLA. To bring the war to a successful conclusion, Machel embarked on a dual strategy, military and diplomatic. He sent Mozambican units into Zimbabwe to fight alongside ZANU guerrillas, while also insisting that the new British Conservative government, under Prime Minister Margaret Thatcher, should resume its responsibilities as the colonial power.

The UK Government hosted a conference at Lancaster House in London, aimed at ending White minority rule and drawing up a constitution for an independent Zimbabwe. Mozambicans, notably Machel's British-trained advisor, Fernando Honwana, were in London to advise the ZANU delegation – and ensured that Mugabe accepted the Lancaster House Agreement, despite its failure to solve the land question, with a small minority of white commercial farmers still holding most of the country's fertile farmland. Machel, with his own intelligence teams on the ground, was certain that ZANU would win any fair election. Indeed, ZANU won 57 of the 80 seats reserved for Black Zimbabweans, while the second nationalist movement, ZAPU, won 20. Ian Smith's Rhodesian Front took the 20 seats, which Mugabe had reluctantly agreed to allocate to the Whites.

Machel was fully aware of the dangerous ethnic divisions in Zimbabwe, with ZANU drawing most of its support from the Shona majority, and ZAPU from the minority Ndebele people. On his first state visit to Zimbabwe, in 1980, Machel gave a warning: "To ensure national unity, there must be no Shonas in Zimbabwe, there must be no Ndebeles in Zimbabwe, there must be Zimbabweans. Some people are proud of their tribalism. But we call tribalists reactionary agents of the enemy".

== Civil War ==
In 1977, a rebel army known as RENAMO launched a rebellion backed by Rhodesia, plunging the country into civil war. Following the collapse of Smith's government, the rebel force began to receive backing from South Africa. The movement was initially known as the RNM (translated into English as MNR), but as from 2003 adopted the acronym Renamo.

During the 1980s, the South African government took an increasingly hostile attitude to the Front Line States. Mozambique, in particular, was accused of harbouring military bases of the African National Congress. On June 30, 1981, South African commandos attacked three houses in the southern city of Matola, killing 12 ANC members as well as a Portuguese electrician. While those killed were members of the ANC's armed wing, Umkhonto we Sizwe (MK - Spear of the Nation), the houses were not a guerrilla base, as visiting diplomats and journalists soon confirmed. A fortnight later, Machel threw down the gauntlet. At a rally in Maputo's independence square, he embraced ANC leader Oliver Tambo and declared "They want to come here and commit murder. So we say: Let them come! Let all the racists come!... Let the South Africans come, but let them be clear that the war will end in Pretoria!"

Helped by weapons airdropped by the South African Defence Force (SADF), Renamo spread its operations across the entire country with the exception of the far north. Frelimo reacted with a series of authoritarian measures, some of which deeply shocked its supporters inside and outside the country. The death penalty, already in force for serious security offences, was now extended to a range of economic crimes. In addition, corporal punishment was imposed as a penalty for a range of offences. Both laws fell into disuse within a year or so but had done severe damage to Frelimo's image. It is widely believed that, at about this time, former Frelimo officials regarded as “traitors” were executed, including Simango and his wife Celina. To this day, Frelimo has published nothing about the circumstances of the execution, though in the Mozambican parliament, in 1995, former security minister Sergio Vieira publicly confirmed “the traitors were executed”. Renamo supporters published colourful versions claiming that the executions happened in 1977, but a date of 1983 seems more likely. In either case, this violated a promise which Machel gave to the Tanzanian and Zambian Presidents, Julius Nyerere and Kenneth Kaunda in 1975.

At the Frelimo Fourth Congress, in April 1983, Frelimo reaffirmed its commitment to Marxism, but admitted economic mistakes, particularly in agriculture. Machel was re-elected President of Frelimo, and once again warmly embraced Oliver Tambo.

But the deteriorating military and economic situation drove Frelimo to give the apartheid government what it said it wanted – a non-aggression pact. On March 16, 1984, on a railway carriage in the non-man's land between South Africa and Mozambique, Machel and South African President P. W. Botha signed the Nkomati Accord on Non-Aggression and Good Neighbourliness. The deal expressed in the agreement was extremely simple – South Africa would drop its support for Renamo in exchange for Mozambique dropping support for the ANC.

Machel only partially honoured commitments to expel various ANC members from his territory. South African support for Renamo did not stop – massive shipments of arms were airlifted to Renamo immediately prior to the Accord, and a senior South African official, Deputy Foreign Minister Louis Nel, even visited the Renamo base at Casa Banana in Gorongosa district, using an airstrip which South Africa had helped Renamo build. In mid-1985, the Mozambican and Zimbabwean armed forces launched a joint offensive to drive Renamo out of Gorongosa. Zimbabwean paratroopers ensured the capture of Casa Banana, but Renamo leader Afonso Dhlakama fled north, and re-established the Renamo HQ in the district of Maringué. Visiting Casa Banana on September 5, Machel was optimistic. "We have broken the back of the snake, but the tail will still thrash around," he said.

But in fact, the war continued, although its focus shifted northwards to Zambezia and Tete provinces, with Renamo operating with impunity out of Malawi. Machel loathed the Malawian "life President" Hastings Kamuzu Banda, who was the only leader of an independent African state who had established diplomatic relations with Pretoria. After an unsuccessful meeting with Banda, Machel openly threatened to place missiles on the Mozambique-Malawi border and to prevent trade from landlocked Malawi passing through Mozambican territory.

== Death ==
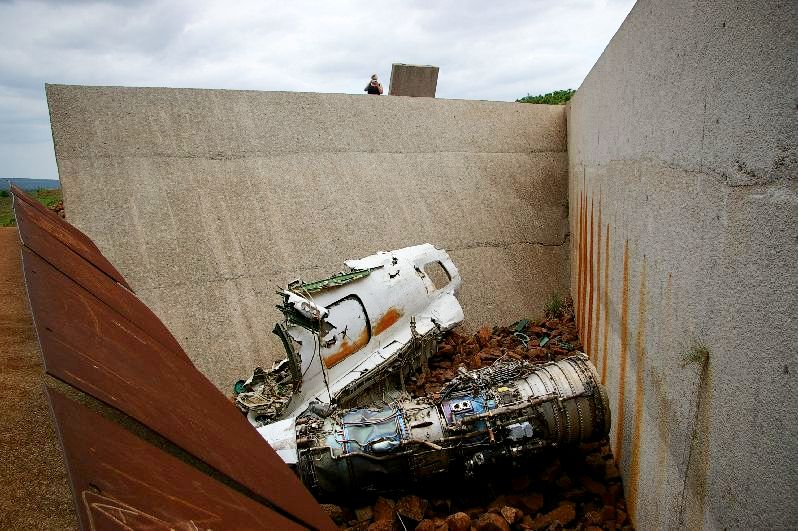
Remains of the wreck

On October 19, 1986, Machel attended a summit in Mbala, Zambia, called to put pressure on Zairean dictator Mobutu Sese Seko, over his support for the Angolan opposition movement UNITA. The strategy of the Front Line States was to move against Mobutu and Banda in an attempt to end their support for UNITA and Renamo, who they regarded as South African surrogates. Although the Zambian authorities invited Machel to stay in Mbala overnight, he insisted on returning to Maputo. He had a meeting scheduled for the following morning at which he intended to reshuffle the leadership of the armed forces. Machel thus overrode the instruction from the Security Ministry that the President should not travel at night – with fatal consequences. The plane never reached Maputo. That night it crashed into a hillside at Mbuzini, just inside South Africa. Machel and 33 others died. Nine people sitting at the back of the plane survived.

=== Investigation ===
The Margo Commission, set up by the South African government, but which included high-level international representation, investigated the incident and concluded that the accident was caused by pilot error. Despite the acceptance of its findings by the International Civil Aviation Organization, the report was rejected by the Mozambican and Soviet governments. The latter submitted a minority report suggesting that the aircraft was intentionally lured off course by a decoy radio navigation beacon set up specifically for this purpose by the South Africans. Speculation about the accident has therefore continued to the present day, particularly in Mozambique.

Hans Louw, a Civil Cooperation Bureau operative, claims to have helped bring about Machel's death. Pik Botha, South African foreign affairs minister at the time, said that the investigation into the plane crash should be re-opened. The Portuguese journalist, José Milhazes, who lived in Moscow from 1977 to 2015 and currently works for the Portuguese newspaper Público and as a correspondent for the Portuguese television channel SIC, maintains that the plane crash had nothing to do with any attempt or any mechanical failure, but was due to several errors of the Russian crew (including the pilot), who, instead of diligently performing their duties, were busy with futile things, like sharing alcoholic and soft drinks unavailable in Mozambique that they had had the possibility to bring from Zambia. In Milhazes' opinion, both the Soviet and the Mozambican authorities had an interest to spread the thesis of an attempt by the South African government: the Soviets wanted to safeguard their reputation (exempting the plane and the crew from any responsibility), the Mozambicans wanted to create a hero.

In 2007, Jacinto Veloso, one of Machel's most unconditional supporters within Frelimo, had sustained in his memoirs that Machel's death was due to a conspiracy between the South African and the Soviet secret services, both of which had reasons to get rid of him. According to Veloso, the Soviet ambassador once asked the President for an audience to convey the USSR's concern about Mozambique's apparent "sliding away" towards the West, to which Machel supposedly replied "Vai à merda!" (Go to hell!). Having then commanded the interpreter to translate, he left the room. Convinced that Machel had irrevocably moved away from their orbit, the Soviets allegedly did not hesitate to sacrifice the pilot and the whole crew of their own plane.

People who died in the crash alongside President Samora Machel
Name	Function
Luís Maria de Alcântara Santos	Minister of Transport & Communication
José Carlos Lobo	Deputy Minister for Foreign Affairs
Fernando Honwana	Special Assistant to the President
Alberto Cangela de Mendonça	Head of the National Protocol
Cox. C. Sikumba	Ambassador of the Republic of Zambia
Tokwalu Batale	Ambassador of the Republic of Zaire
Aquino de Bragança	Director of the Center for African Studies, University Eduardo Mondlane
João Tomás Navesse	Deputy Director of the Directorate of Legal & Consular Affairs of the Ministry of Foreign Affairs
Muradali Mamadhusen	Private Secretary to President
Ivete Amós	Secretary of the President
Osvaldo de Sousa	English interpreter of the President
Bernardino Chiche	French interpreter of the President
Gulamo Khan	Press Attaché
Daniel Maquinasse	President's private photographer
Azarias Inguane	Photographer of Jornal Notícias
Henriques Bettencourt	Doctor of President
Ulisses La Rosa Mesa	Personal Doctor of President
Capitão Parente Manjate	member of staff of the Presidency
Nacir Charamadame	member of staff of the Presidency
Adão Gore Nhoca	member of staff of the Presidency
Eduardo Viegas	member of staff of the Presidency
Albino Falteira	member of staff of the Presidency
José Quivanane	member of staff of the Presidency
Alberto Chaúque	member of staff of the Presidency
Orlando Garrine	Flight attendant
Esmeralda Luísa	Flight attendant
Sofia Arone	Flight attendant
Ilda Carão	Flight attendant
Iuri Novdran	Aircraft Commander
Igor Kartmychev	Flight Engineer
Amatoli Choulipov	Flight Engineer
Fernando Nhanquila	Flight Engineer

== Funeral and burial ==
Machel's state funeral was held in Maputo on October 28, 1986. It was attended by numerous political leaders and other notable people from Africa and elsewhere, including Robert Mugabe of Zimbabwe, Kenneth Kaunda of Zambia, Julius Nyerere of Tanzania, King Moshoeshoe II of Lesotho, Daniel arap Moi of Kenya and Yasser Arafat of Palestinian State. Also present were the ANC leader Oliver Tambo, the U.S. President's daughter Maureen Reagan, the First Deputy Prime Minister of the Soviet Union Heidar Aliyev, and the civil rights leader, Jesse Jackson.

At the funeral, the acting leader of Frelimo, Marcelino dos Santos, said in a speech: "The shock of your journey from which there is no return still shudders through the body of the entire nation. You fell in the struggle against apartheid… You understood apartheid as a problem for all humanity."

Samora Machel was buried in a star-shaped crypt at Mozambican Heroes' Square, a traffic junction in Maputo.

== Marriages and family life ==
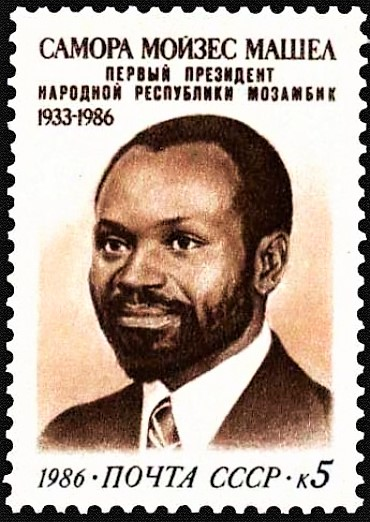
Postage stamp issued by the Soviet Union in Machel's honor in 1986

In the late 1950s, when Machel was working as a nurse on Inhaca Island, he met a local girl, Sorita Tchaiakomo, and set up house with her. Their first child, Joscelina, was born on Inhaca in 1958. Idelson (1959) and Olívia (1961) were both born after the family returned to the mainland, where they lived in Mafalala, a suburb of Lourenço Marques. Machel returned to the Miguel Bombarda Hospital and was accepted onto a course of further training. At the hospital he began a relationship with another nurse, Irene Buque. She gave birth to their daughter Ornila in February 1963, three weeks before Machel left Mozambique to join Frelimo. N’tewane, Tchaiakomo's fourth child with Machel, was born that September, six months after Machel had left the country. Later, Machel expressed remorse for what he had come to see as bad behaviour towards Sorita and Irene.

Machel was not married to either Tchaiakomo or Buque. When he joined Frelimo in 1963 it was widely believed that the war for independence would last years, if not decades, and that the chances of Frelimo cadres being reunited with their families in Mozambique were vanishingly small. Josina Abiatar Muthemba, who had been active in the anti-colonial student organisation NESAM, arrived in Tanzania in 1965, on her second attempt to flee Mozambique. In Tanzania she worked first as an assistant to Janet Mondlane, Eduardo Mondlane's wife and director of the Mozambique Institute. She became one of the earliest recruits to the Women's Detachment of the guerrilla army, and campaigned vigorously for women's full inclusion within all aspects of the liberation struggle. She and Machel were married at Tunduru in southern Tanzania in May 1969. In November their only son Samora, known as Samito, was born. Josina returned to work as head of Social Affairs, with special responsibility for the welfare of war orphans, and for the health and education of all children in the war zones of northern Mozambique. But she felt increasingly unwell. In 1970 she travelled to the Soviet Union to seek a diagnosis for her chronic ill-health, but to no avail. She was probably suffering from leukaemia, although pancreatic cancer is another possibility. She died on April 7, 1971, aged twenty-five. Machel was devastated.

Machel's second wife, Graça Simbine, joined Frelimo in 1973 after graduating in modern languages from Lisbon University. She worked as a teacher, first in Frelimo-held areas in Cabo Delgado province, and then at the Frelimo school in Tanzania. She became Minister for Education and Culture in newly independent Mozambique. She and Machel were married three months after Independence, in September 1975. In April 1976 a daughter, Josina, was born, and in December 1978 a son, Malengane. At Independence Machel's five older children joined Josina Machel's son Samito in the Presidential household. In 1998, twelve years after Samora Machel's death, Graça Machel married Nelson Mandela, President of South Africa, thus becoming the only woman to have been First Lady of two countries. His son, Samora Machel Jr., has been chairman of the Board of Directors of Montepuez Ruby Mining since 2011, when the company was founded.

== International relationships ==
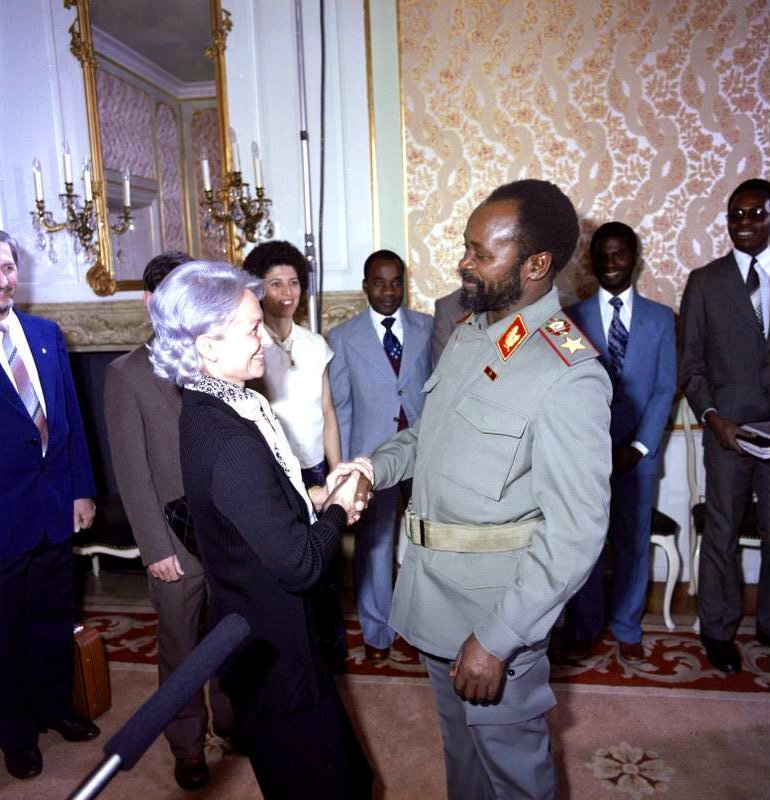
Machel meeting Margot Honecker in Berlin, 1983

Samora Machel established a strong relationship with Italy, because of its interest in fighting apartheid and Portuguese colonialism. In particular, the city of Reggio Emilia organized many initiatives to draw Italian attention to the great political problems of southern Africa. On March 24 and 25, 1973, Machel took part in the first "National Conference of solidarity against colonialism and imperialism for freedom and independence of Mozambique, Angola and Guinea Bissau". When Reggio Emilia sent the first solidarity ship "Amanda", Machel welcomed it at the port of Maputo. He said: "Solidarity is not a charity act. It's cooperation, mutual support between peoples striving to reach the same goal. This ship brings peace, it brings the solidarity of the whole Italian people for every population." He returned to visit Reggio Emilia in 1981.

== Foreign honours ==
- Cuba
  - Recipient of the Order of José Martí
  - Recipient of the Order of Playa Girón
- Italy
  - Knight Grand Cross with Collar of the Order of Merit of the Italian Republic
- North Korea
  - Order of the National Flag, First Class
- Portugal
  - Grand Collar of the Order of Prince Henry
- Soviet Union
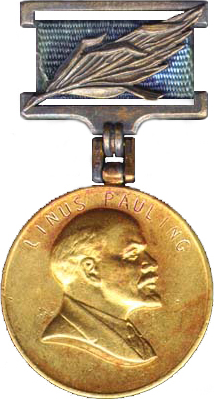
  - Lenin Peace Prize
  - Recipient of the Order of Friendship of Peoples
- Tanzania
  - Order of the Uhuru Torch of Mount Kilimanjaro, First Class
- East Timor
  - Great-collar of the Order of Timor-Leste
- Yugoslavia
  - Order of the Yugoslav Great Star

== Legacy ==
=== Eponyms ===
- Samora Machel Air Force Base in Mbala, Northern Zambia.
- Samora Machel Avenue, in the Dar es Salaam central business district in Tanzania (about 1.75 km)
- Samora Machel Stadium, in Iringa, Tanzania
- Samora Machel Secondary School, in Mbeya, Tanzania
- Samora Machel Avenue, in Gaborone, Botswana
- Samora Machel Avenue, in Harare, Zimbabwe
- Samora Machel Avenue, in Luanda, Angola
- Samora Machel Bridge, (formerly Tete Bridge) across the Zambezi River in Tete, Mozambique (762 metres)
- Samora Machel constituency, (formerly Wanaheda constituency in 2003) in Khomas Region, Namibia
- Samora Machel House, residence for female students at the University of Limpopo, Turfloop Campus
- Samora Machel School of Veterinary Medicine, University of Zambia
- Samora Machel Street, in Moscow, Russian Federation
- Samora Machel Street, in Asokoro, Abuja, Nigeria
- Samora Machel Street, in Utrecht, Netherlands
- Samora Machel Road, in Accra, Ghana
- Samora Machel Park, in Reggio Emilia, Italy
- Samora Machel Avenue, Mbombela (formerly Nelspruit), South Africa
- Samora Machel Street (Formerly Aliwal Street) in Durban, South Africa

=== Memorial ===
A memorial at the Mbuzini crash site was inaugurated on January 19, 1999, by Nelson Mandela and his wife Graça, and by President Joaquim Chissano of Mozambique. Now the monument is made professional and the memorial service is held on October 19 each year. Designed by Mozambican architect José Forjaz, at a cost to the South African government of 1.5 million Rand (US$300,000), the monument comprises 35 steel tubes symbolising the number of lives lost in the air crash. At least eight foreigners were killed there, including the four Soviet crew members, Machel's two Cuban doctors and the Zambian and Zairean ambassadors to Mozambique.

There is a large street in downtown Dar es Salaam, the de facto capital of Tanzania, called Samora Avenue. One of the largest streets in Harare, the capital of Zimbabwe, was renamed Samora Machel Avenue (from Jameson Avenue) after independence in a gesture of gratitude for Machel's support for black liberation activities before majority rule. Also, a street in Moscow bears his name and the Zimbabwean band R.U.N.N. family had a hit song that mourned his loss.

=== Printed sources ===
- Munslow, Barry (ed.). Samora Machel, An African Revolutionary: Selected Speeches and Writings, London: Zed Books, 1985.

== See also ==
- List of unsolved deaths

Political offices
Preceded by None, office created	President of Mozambique; 1975-1986	Succeeded by Joaquim Chissano
