= Portuguese colonial architecture =

Styles of Portuguese architecture built across the Portuguese Empire

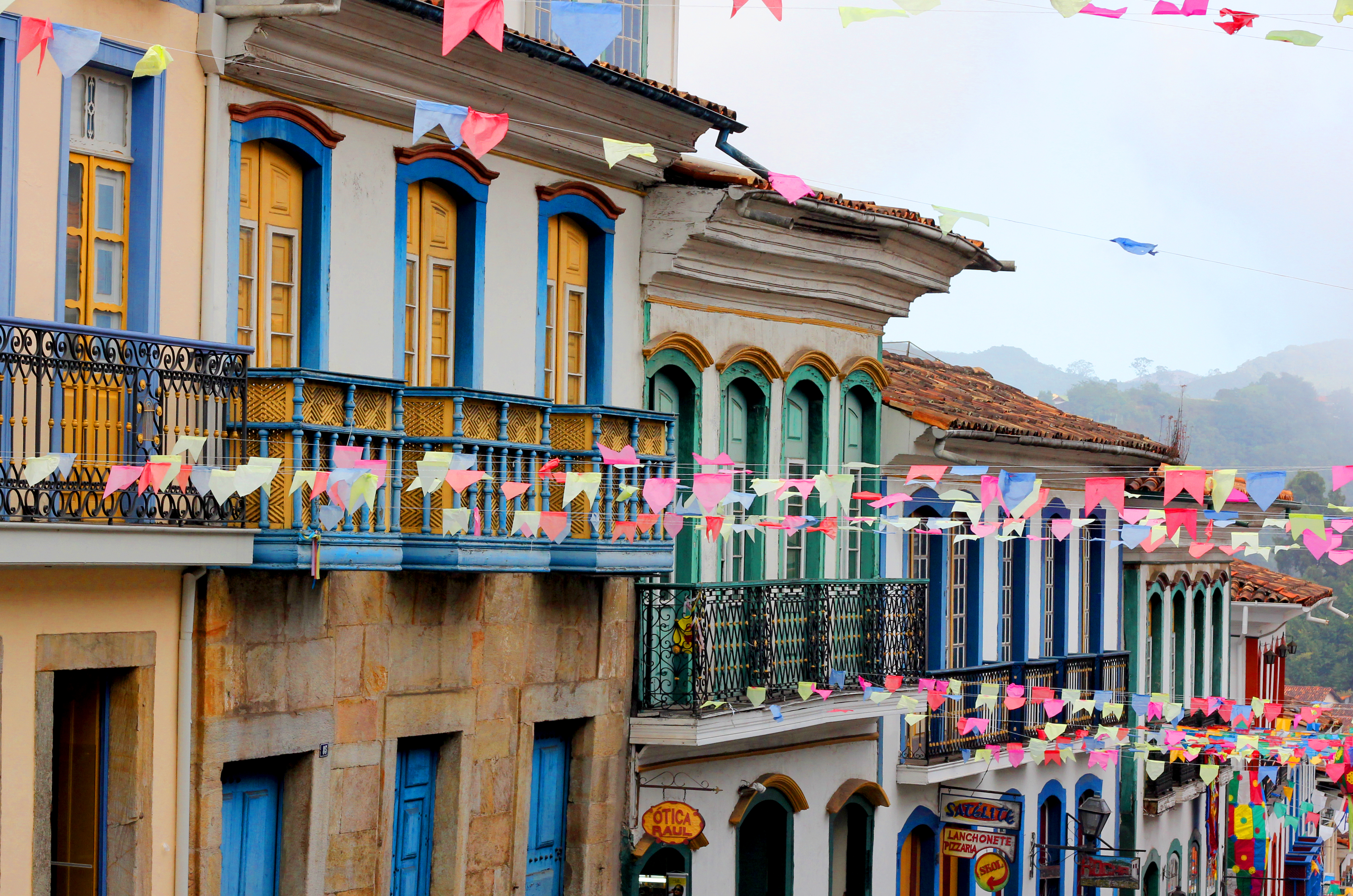
Portuguese-styled townhouses, called sobrados, in Ouro Preto, Brazil

Portuguese colonial architecture refers to the various styles of Portuguese architecture built across the Portuguese Empire (including Portugal). Many former colonies, especially Brazil, Macau, and India, promote their Portuguese architecture as major tourist attractions. Portuguese colonial architecture can be found in the plethora of former colonies throughout South America, North Africa, Sub-Saharan Africa, India, Oceania, and East Asia.

== 15th century ==
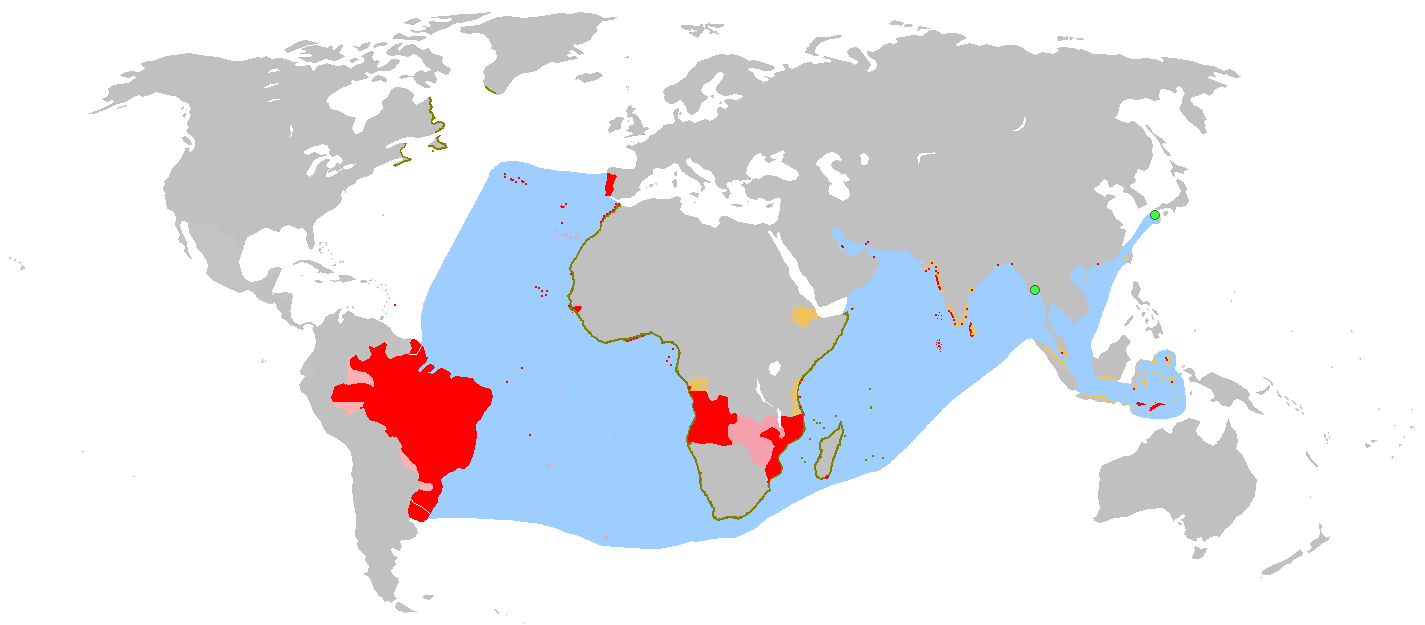
A map of the Portuguese Empire and its claims, strongholds, trade waters, and economic interests

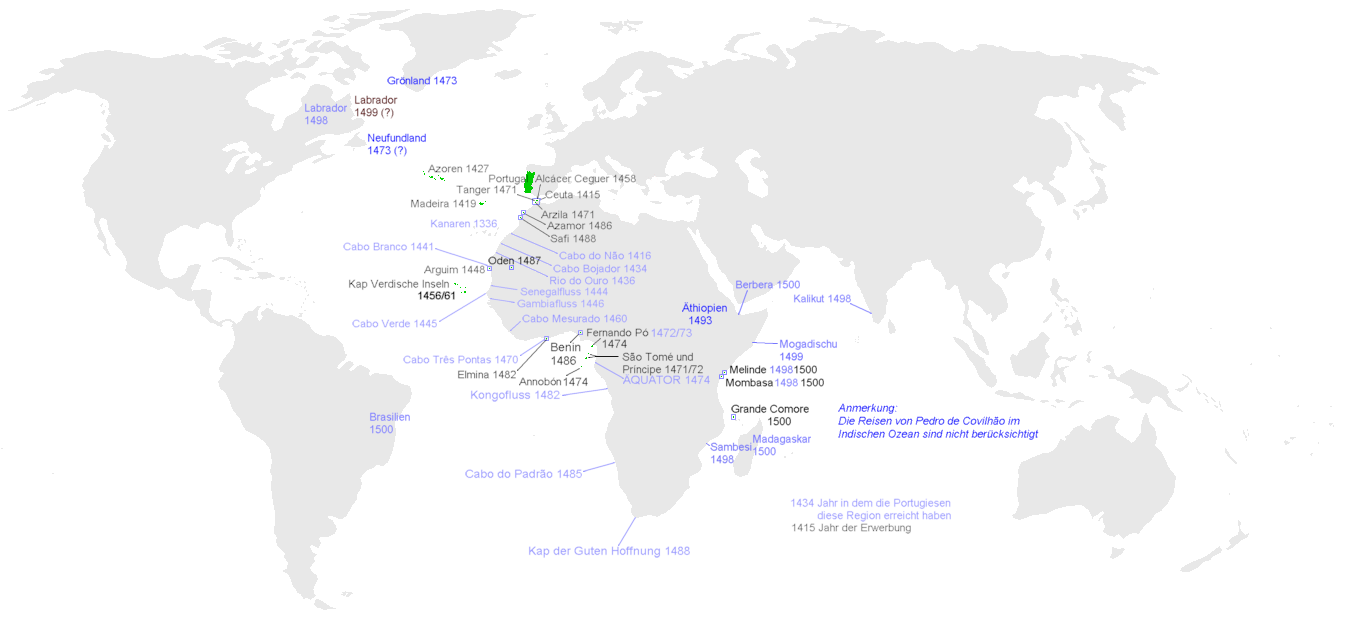
The Portuguese Empire at the end of the 15th century

During the 15th century, the Portuguese Empire laid its foundations across the world as the world's first modern colonial empire, and what would be the longest. The Empire came into existence in 1415, with the Capture of Ceuta, by the forces of Infante Henrique of Aviz, the "Navigator". This key victory initiated a century of Portuguese expansion and colonization of the African continent. In North Africa, the Portuguese conquered Ceuta, 1415, Alcácer Ceguer, 1458, Arzila, 1471, Tangiers, 1471, Mazagão, 1485, Ouadane, 1487, Safim, 1488, and Graciosa, 1489. In Sub-Saharan Africa, the Portuguese established and colonized Anguim, 1455, Cabo Verde, 1462, São Tomé and Príncipe, 1470, Annobón, 1474, Fernando Pó, 1478, São Jorge da Mina, 1482, Portuguese Gold Coast, 1482, and the Mascarenhas, 1498. It was also in the 15th century when the Portuguese established Portuguese India, conquering the Laquedivas and landing at Calicut, both in 1498. The Azores and Madeira would also be added to the Empire in 1432 and 1420, respectively.

During the 15th century, the Portuguese Empire was expanding and laying its foundations, and the colonial architecture of this period was built following a militaristic and functional base. Most of Portugal's colonies were defended by military fortifications, today the highlight of Portuguese colonial architecture of the period. The Fort of São Jorge da Mina is a well-preserved example of 15th-century Portuguese colonial architecture. Beginning construction in 1482, the fort was, for a long period, the most sophisticated and impenetrable fortification in Sub-Saharan Africa. Like many Portuguese castles and colonial fortifications of the time, the fort was built in a sober and functional style, with an importance more on defensibility that appearance. On the interior of most Portuguese colonial forts of the 15th century, highlights of governor's mansions and imperial administrative buildings included the occasional Gothic and Manueline portal, fountain, or window.

Apart from military architecture, religious architecture was an important genre of interest in 15th-century Portuguese colonial architecture. Religious expansion being a backbone of Portuguese imperial expansion during the 15th century, many of the oldest Christian churches of Africa were founded by the Portuguese during this time. The Cathedral of Funchal, the oldest cathedral in Africa, started 1491, is a good exampled of Portuguese colonial religious architecture. During the 15th century, most Portuguese colonial religious buildings, much like those of military and civic purpose, were built soberly and with few extravagancies. Portuguese colonial churches of the 15th century, however sober they may have been, were the center point of most of the many Portuguese colonies at the time, and thus were usually the most ornate buildings in the colony, ornateness in this period meaning a detailed portal or window. The Cathedral of Funchal best typifies the 15th-century Portuguese colonial church, with its tall and sturdy stronghold-like church walls with a detailed Gothic portal and rose window.

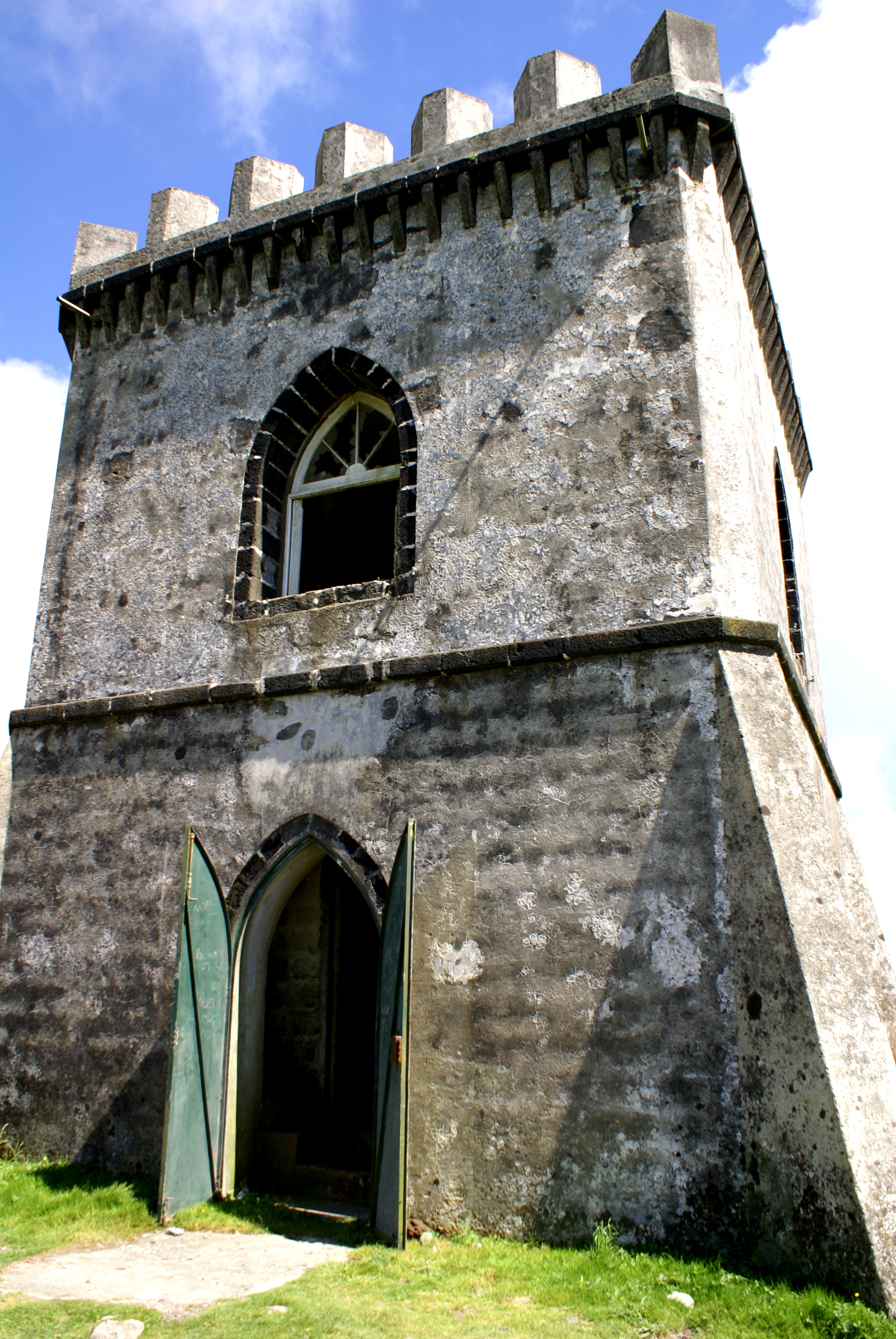
Tower of Castelo Branco
b. 1471, Azores

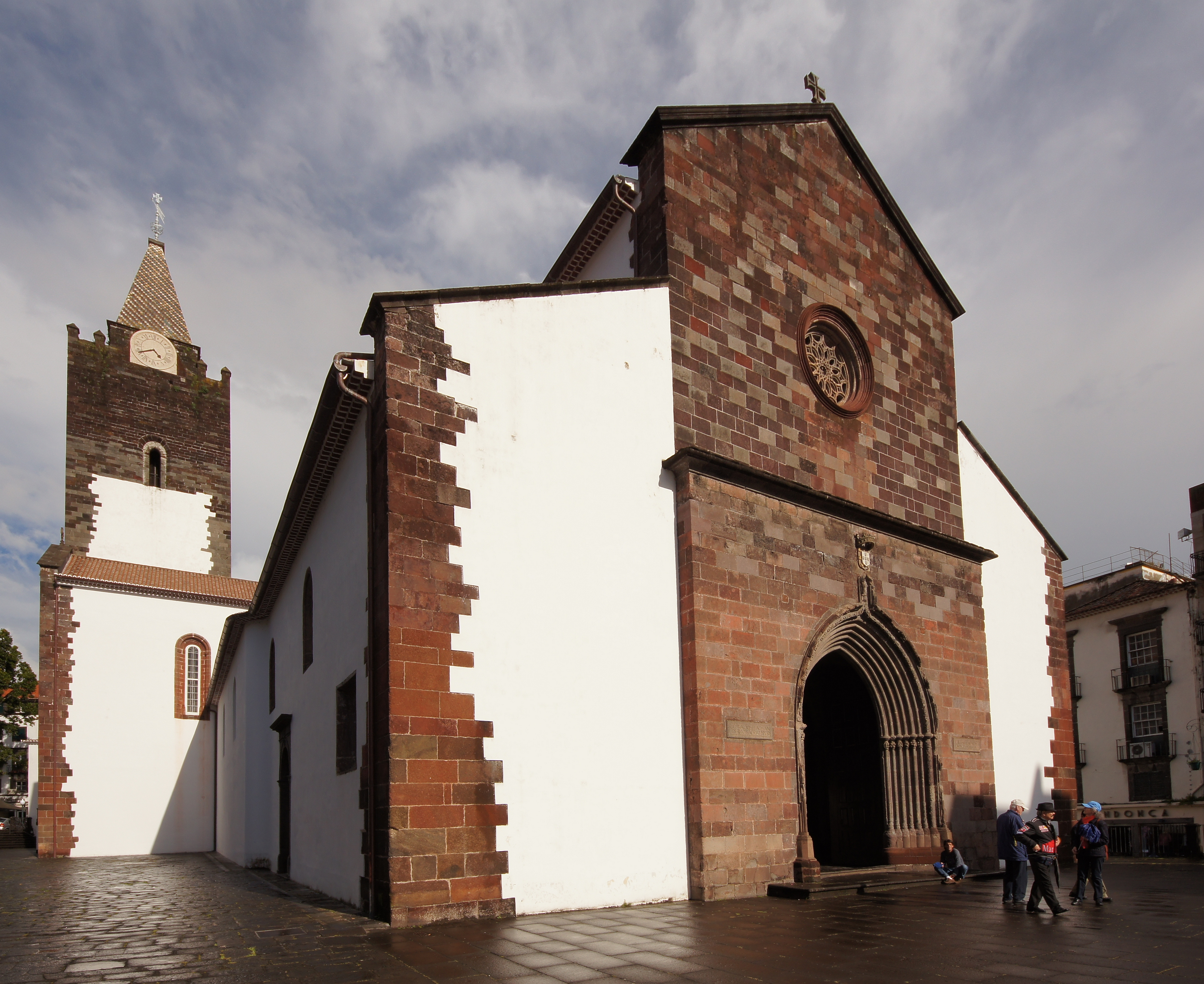
Cathedral of Funchal;
b. 1491, Madeira

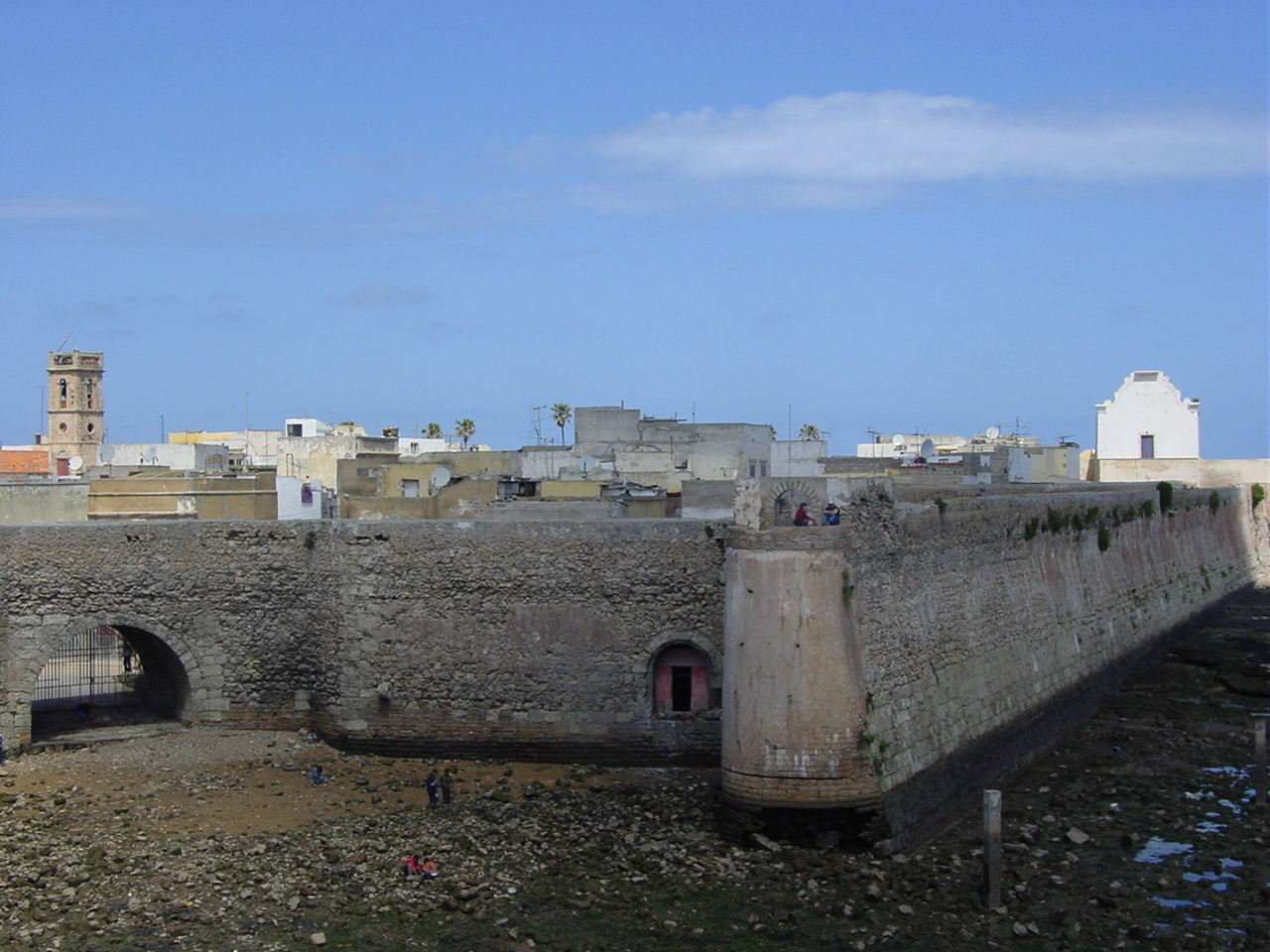
Fort of Mazagão;
b. 1485, Morocco

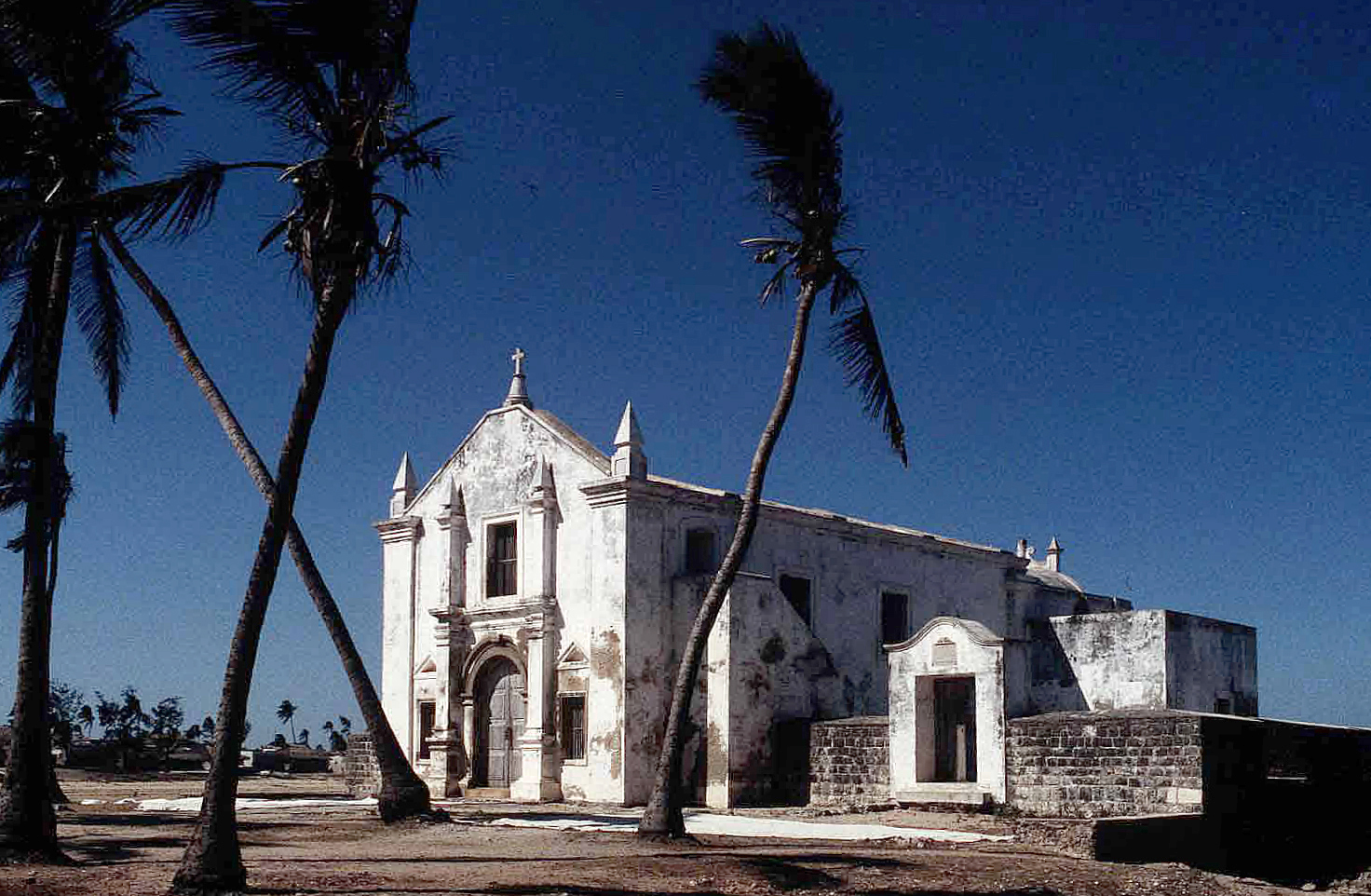
Church of Santo António;
b. 1498, Mozambique

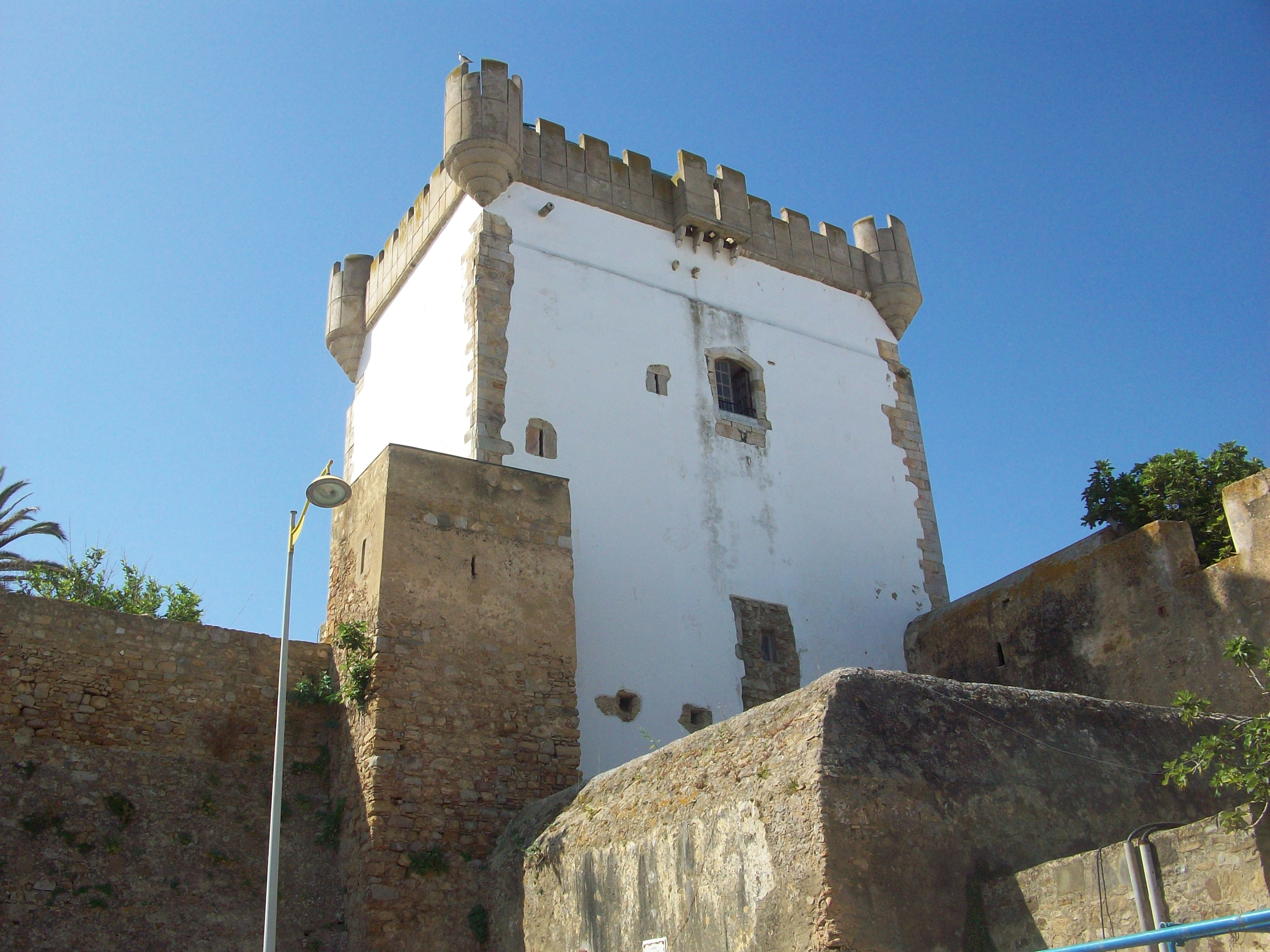
Fort of São João of Arzila;
b. 1475, Morocco

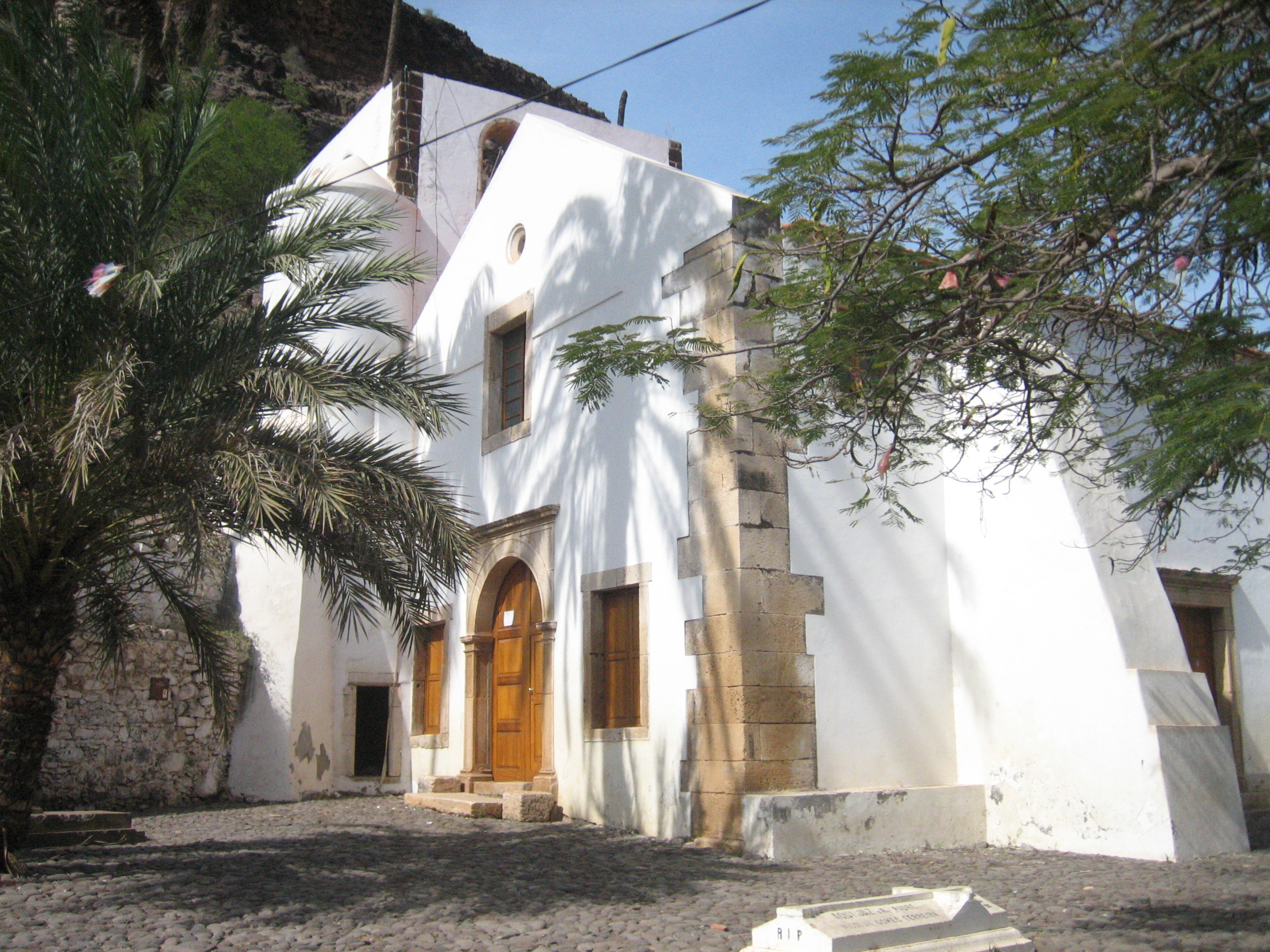
Church of N. S. do Rosário;
b. 1495, Cape Verde

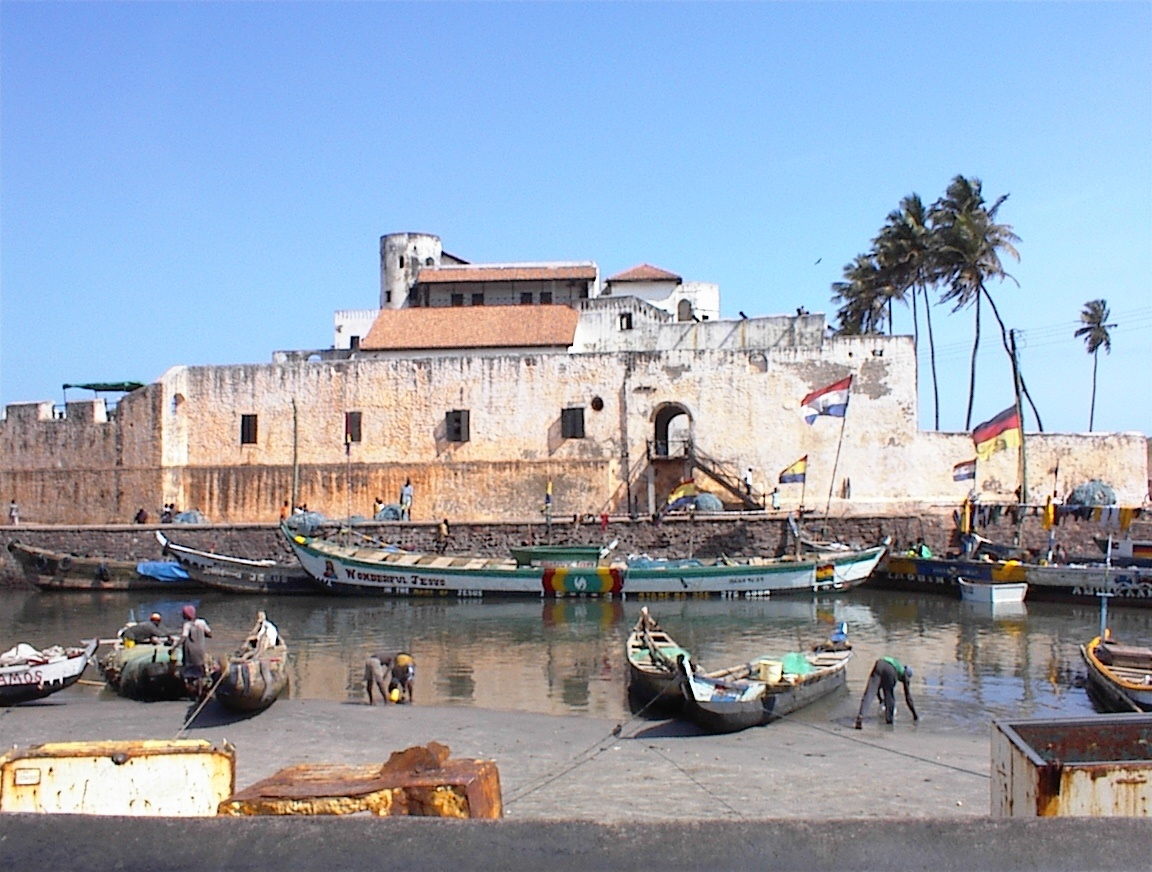
Fort of São Jorge da Mina;
b. 1482, Ghana

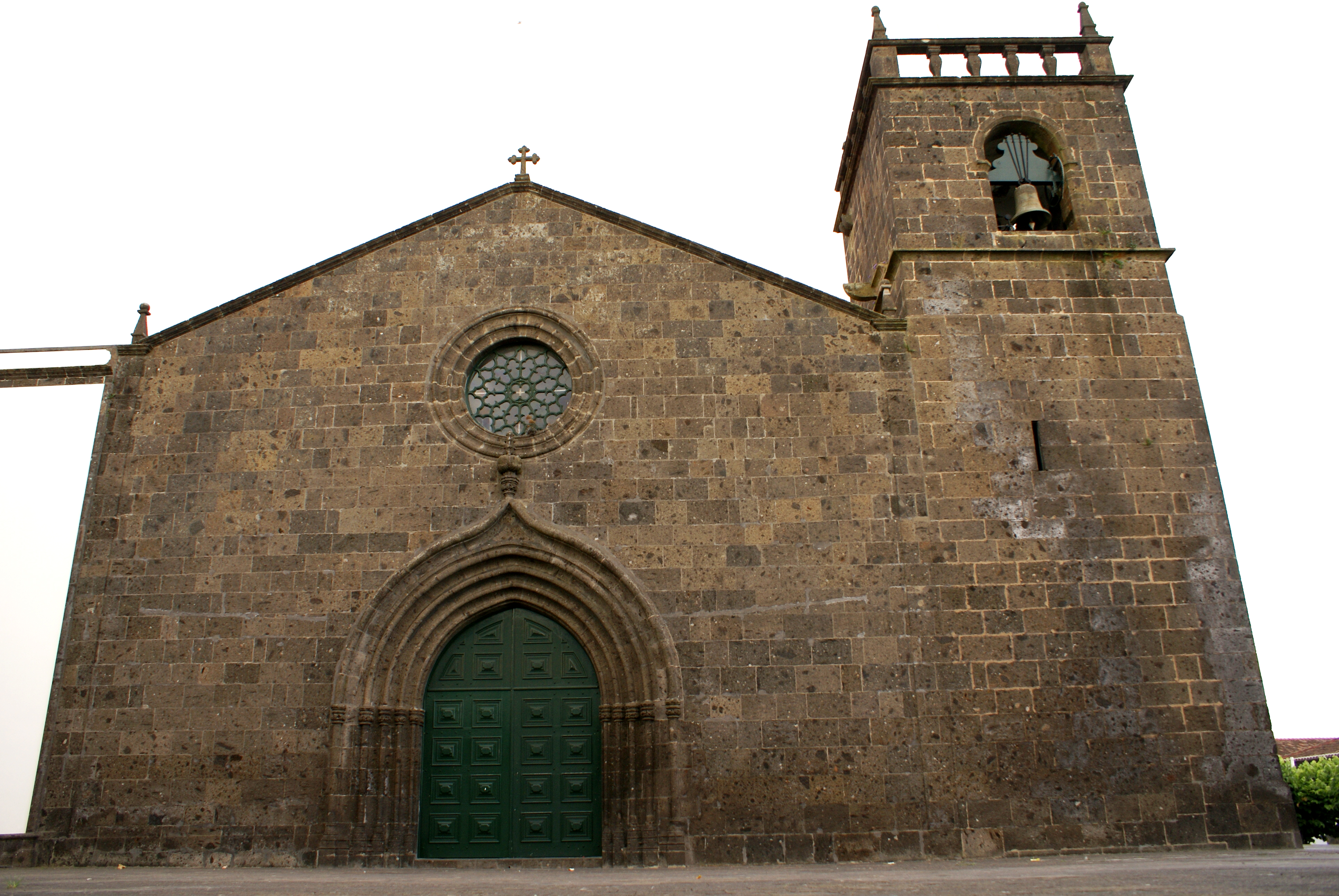
S. Miguel Arcanjo Church;
b. 1460, Azores

== 16th century ==
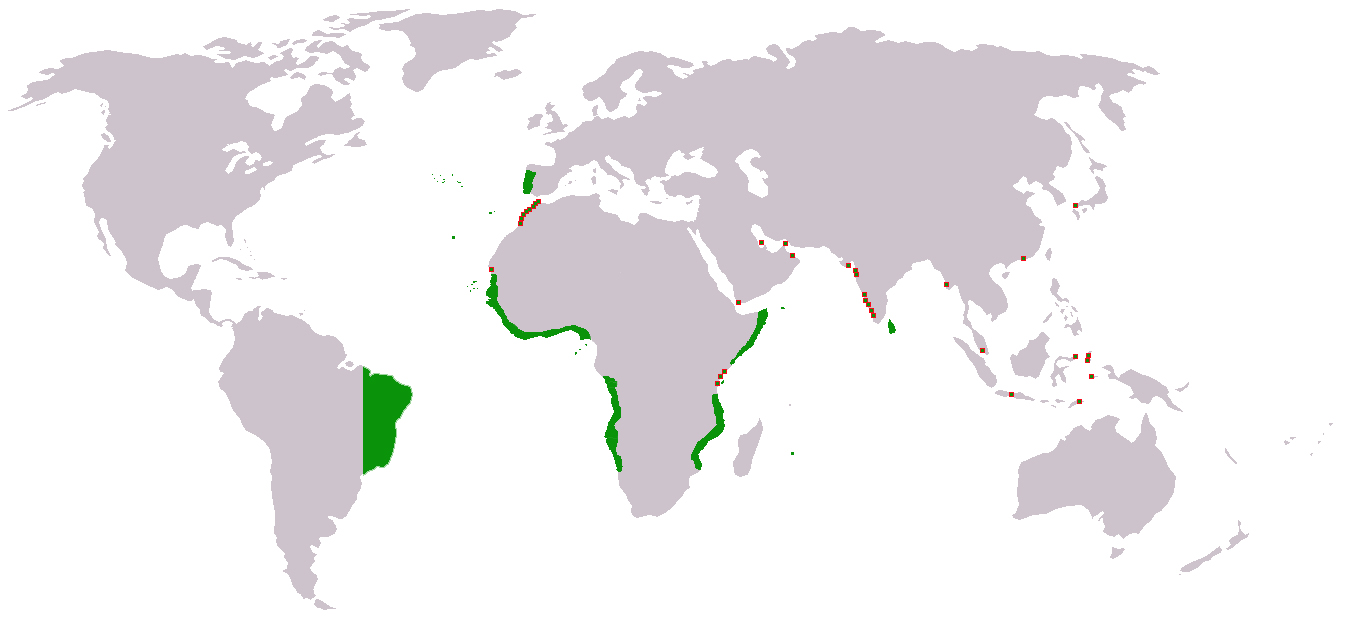
The Portuguese Empire at the end of the 16th century

During the 16th century, the Portuguese Empire was the largest, and wealthiest, European colonial empire and Portugal was one of Europe's most important states. Within the first year of the century, 1500, the Portuguese had established the Captaincy Colonies of Brazil, in South America, the colonies of Terra Nova and Labrador, in North America, the trade-colonies of Cochim, in India, and Melinde, in Sub-Saharan Africa. This century really solidified the Portuguese stronghold on the spice trade, with territorial expansions in Portuguese India, with the conquest of key cities, such as Calecute, 1512, Bombaim, 1534, Baçaím, 1535, and Salsete, 1534, among others. The Portuguese colonization of the Americas also began in the 16th century, establishing three North American colonies and thirteen South American colonies, but by the end of the century the number of colonies, in total, was reduced to four, due to integration into mega-colonies. In the far east, the Portuguese established Portuguese Macau, 1537, and Portuguese Timor, 1596. By the end of the century, the Portuguese Empire was an enormously vast empire, spanning from Portuguese Malacca, in East Asia, and the Governorate General of Brazil, in South America, to Ormuz, on the Persian Gulf, and Mombaça, in Sub-Saharan Africa. The expansion of the empire, both territorially and economically, influenced Portuguese colonial architecture a great deal.

Like in the 15th century, Portuguese colonial architecture in the 16th century was built for the utmost functionality and purpose. Unlike in the previous epoch, however, 16th-century Portuguese colonial architecture did not skip aesthetics in order to pursue functionality, instead it was, for the first time, able to truly compromise the two ideals of beauty and function, an ideal persistent throughout the Portuguese Renaissance. As in most times, military structures of the period were usually large, foreboding forts, but Portuguese colonial architecture of the 16th century also saw the creation of administrative palaces and governor mansions within these forts, which were built in a manner following necessity but also taste and style, on a different level than seen before. A good example of a Portuguese colonial military fort with palatial accommodations is the Fort of the Reis Magos, in Natal, Brazil. The fort is located on the edge of the ocean, on a strategic location for both land and sea attacks, and is completely sober in its exterior façade. On the interior, however, the Governor's Mansion was built in a simple, but stylish at the time, Alentejo style, originating in the south of Portugal.

Alongside the increased sophistication of Portuguese colonial military architecture in the 16th century, religious architecture hit a level never seen before in the Portuguese Empire. Portugal's immense wealth from its empire, mainly from the spice trade, fueled its historical religious zeal for converting non-Christians. Portuguese India of the 16th century was the cultural and economic powerhouse of the Portuguese Empire, and this, in combination with the Goa Inquisition, subset of the Portuguese Inquisition, created a major court of the Portuguese Renaissance, evident in the enormous and elaborate churches of the epoch. The Cathedral of Goa, the cathedral for Portuguese India, embodies most all of what Portuguese colonial religious architecture stood for. The cathedral was built to commemorate a Christian victory, that of Afonso de Albuquerque over the Moslems, and the edifice is built in a grandiose Portuguese classical style. The high bell towers and detailed portal and windows are typical of Portuguese churches, and they seek to show Christian, more importantly Portuguese, dominance of the area, a major theme of Portuguese colonial religious architecture of the 16th century.

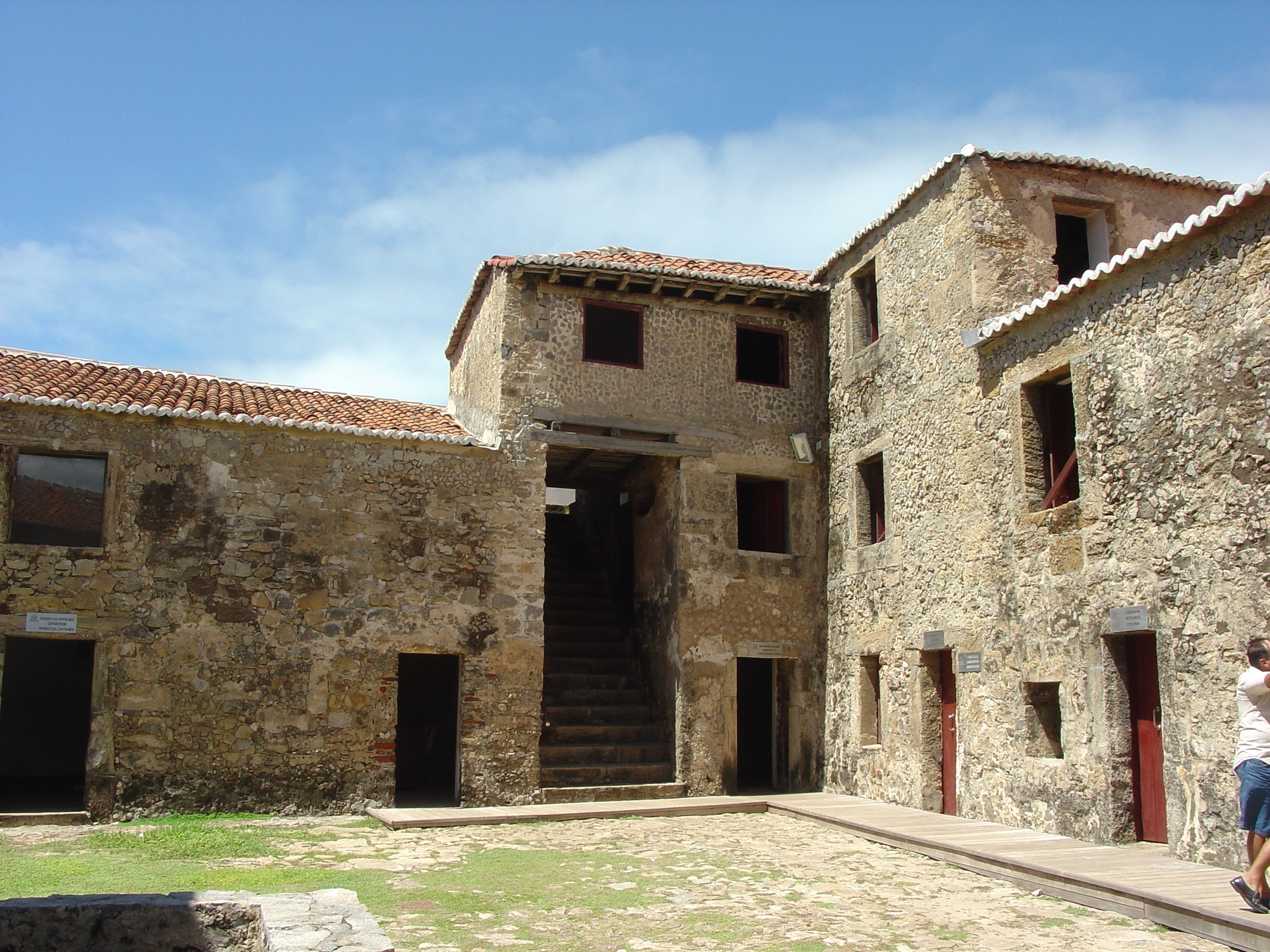
Fort of the Reis Magos;
b. 1598, Brazil

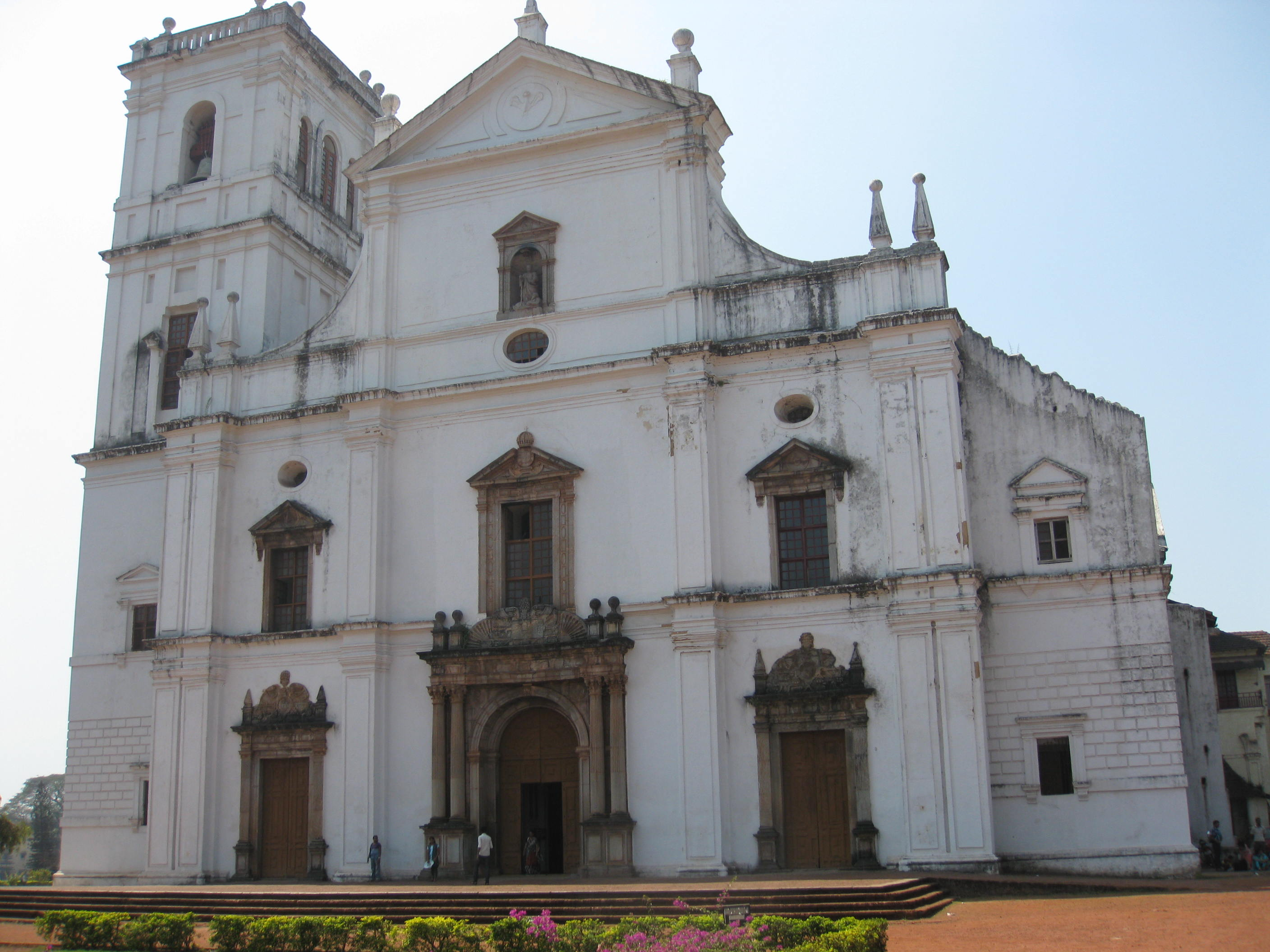
Cathedral of Goa;
b. 1510, India

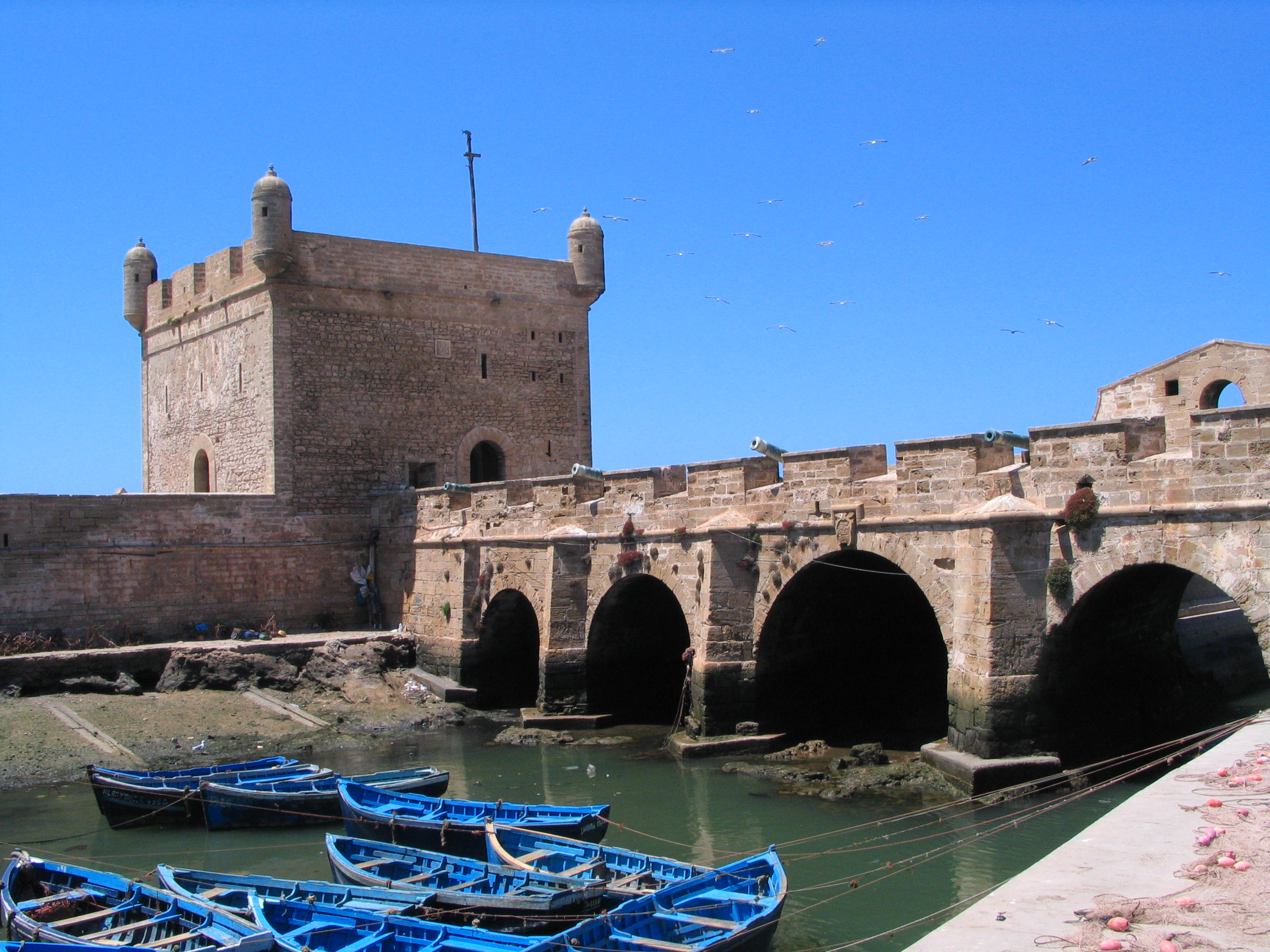
Castelo Real of Mogador
b. 1506, Morocco

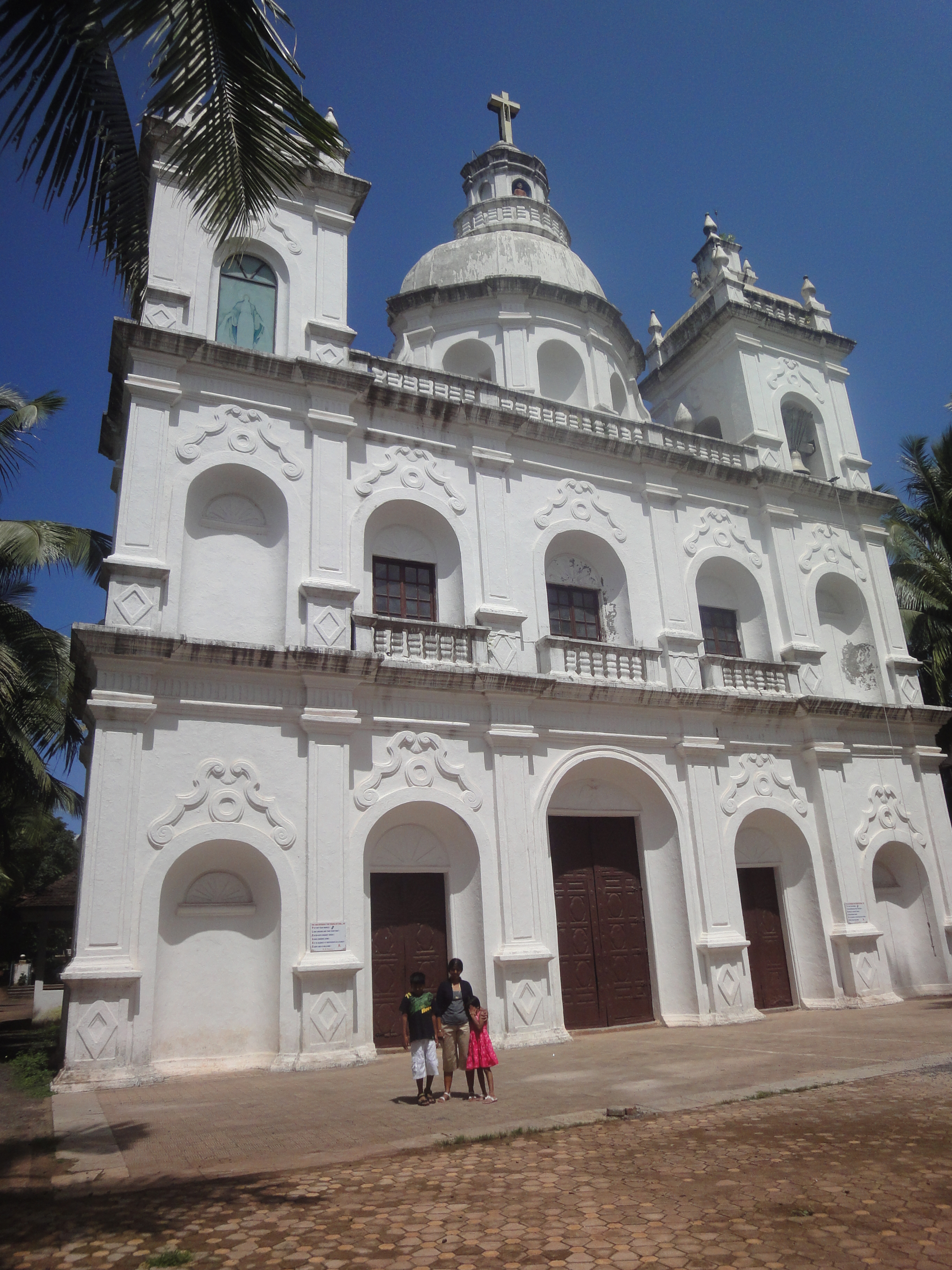
Church of São Francisco;
b. 1517, India

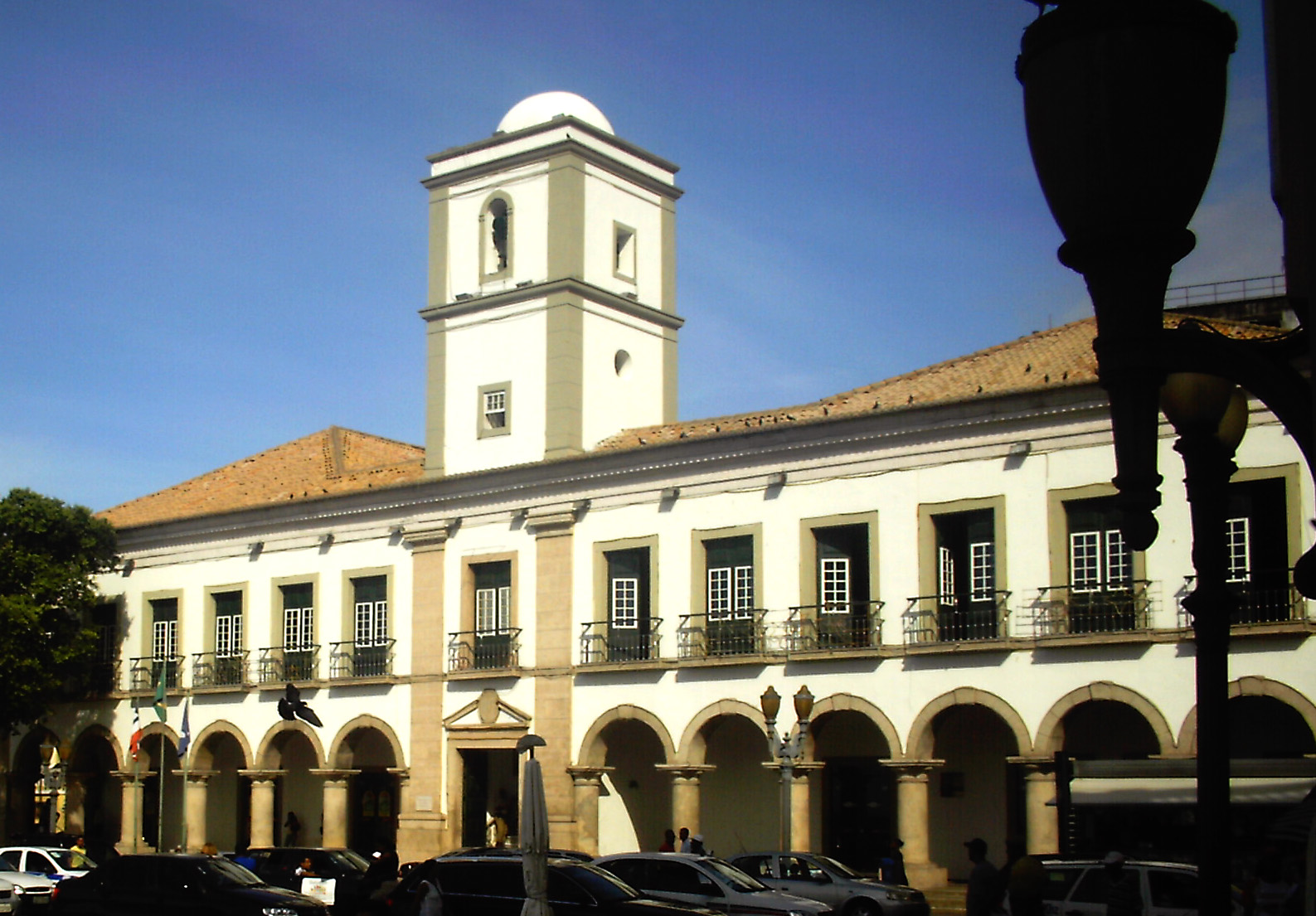
Salvador Municipal Palace;
b. 1549, Brazil

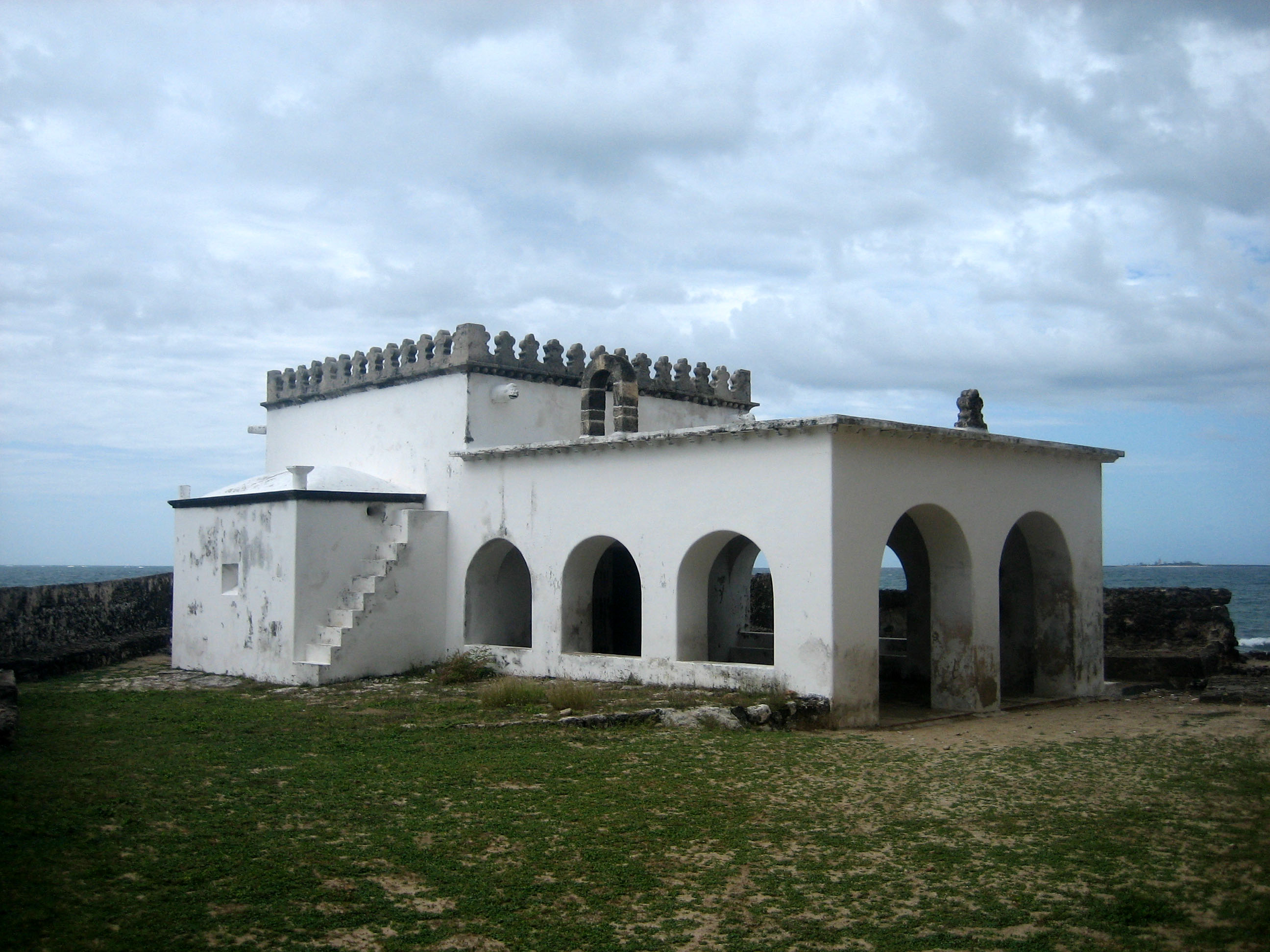
N. S. de Baluarte Chapel;
b. 1522, Mozambique

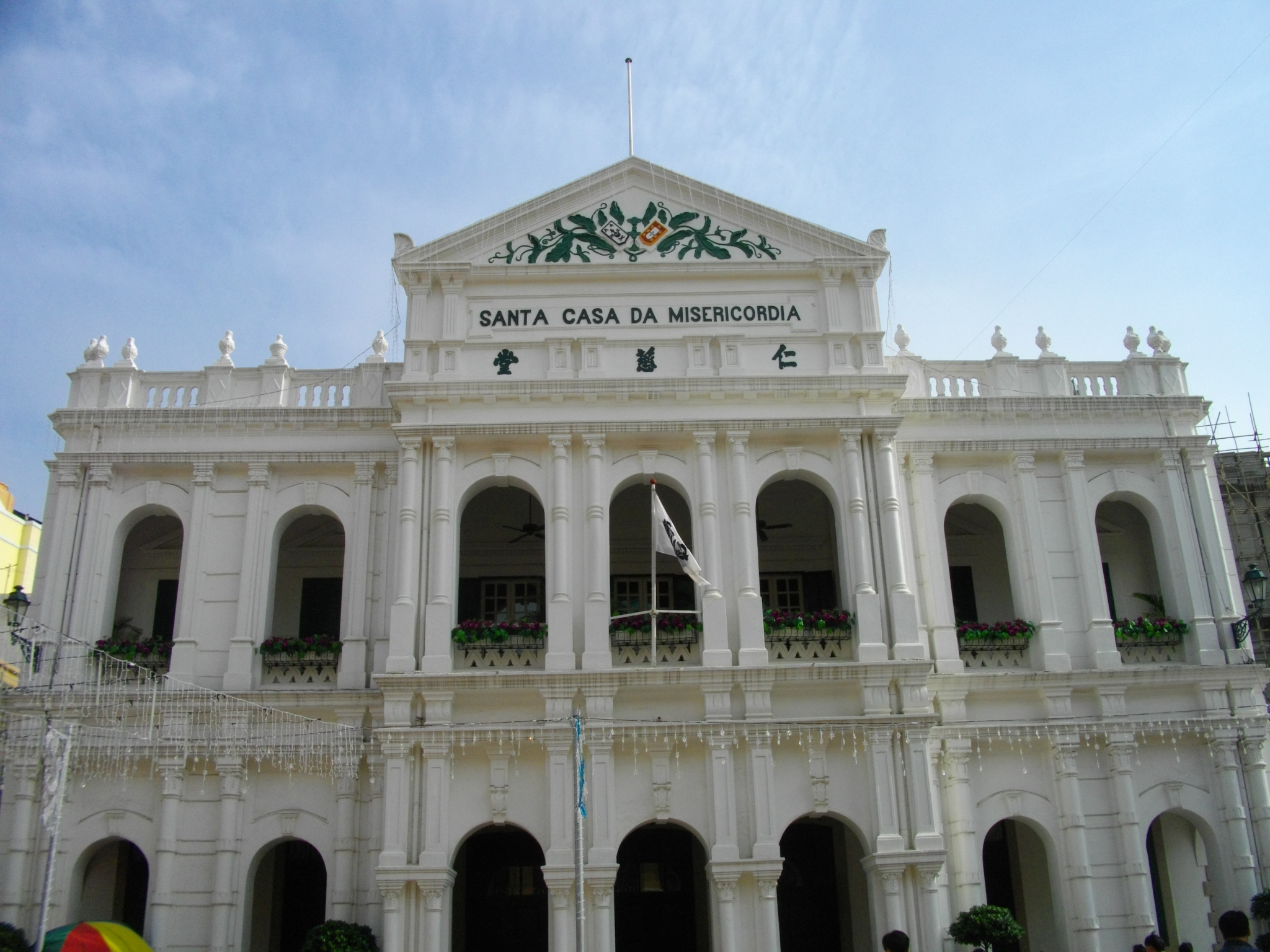
Santa Casa da Misericórdia;
b. 1569, Macau

== 17th century ==
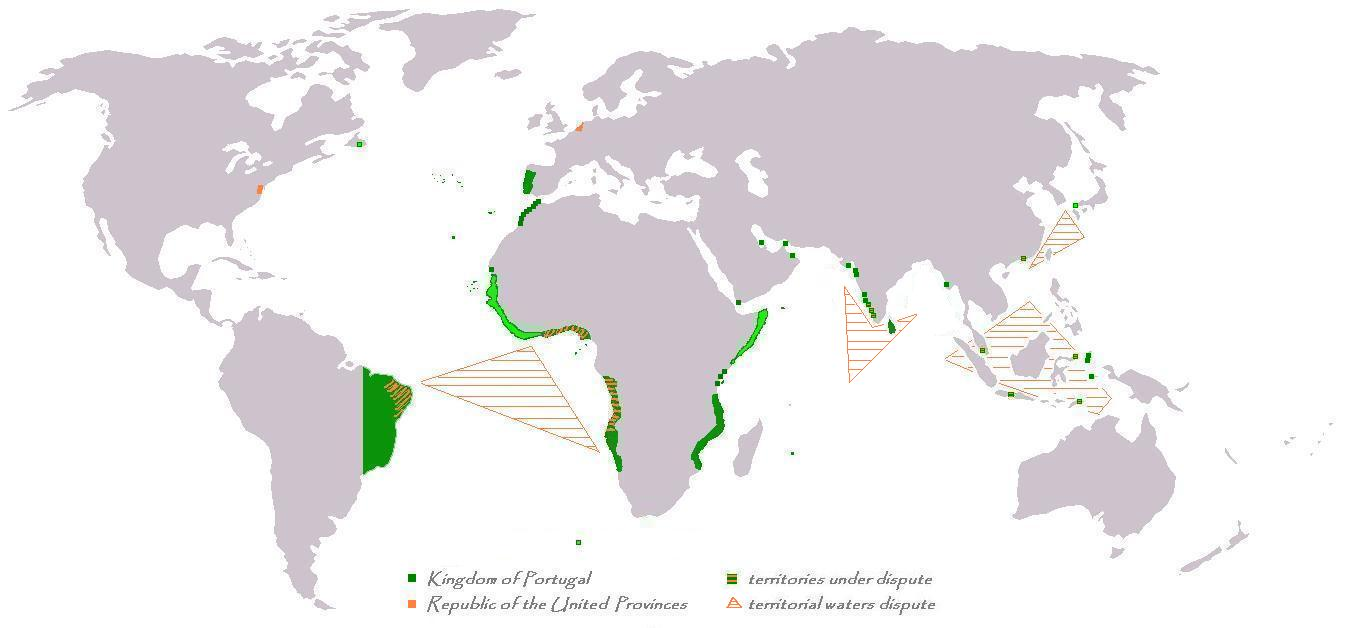
The Portuguese Empire at the end of the 17th century

For the Portuguese Empire, the 17th century was a time of reclamation and gradual increase. After the Dutch-Portuguese War, the Portuguese reclaimed the territories that the Dutch had occupied during the Iberian Union. In India, Portuguese territories were no longer the only powerful Europeans in the region and the colonies there saw minimal expansion, São Tomé de Meliapor, 1687, as well as the transfer of Bombaim to the British, 1661, as part of Catherine of Braganza's dowry. In Africa, the Portuguese expanded along the coast, with São João Baptista de Ajudá, 1680, and Bissau, 1687, and inland, with Ziguinchor, 1645. The centre and focus of Portuguese imperial ambition, during the 17th century, was Portuguese America. With the abandonment of Barbados, 1620, and the restructuration of the Governorate General of Brazil, 1621, Portuguese colonial possessions in the Americas were reestablished into two colonial states, the State of Brazil and the State of Maranhão. With the foundation of Colony of Santíssimo Sacramento, in 1680, the Portuguese gained substantial territorial gains in South America. Expansion, coupled with the riches from the Brazilian Gold Rush, fostered a new level of Portuguese colonial architecture in Portuguese America, that based itself more on lavishness and wealth than the sober and conservative stylistic bases of the 16th century.

Initially, the 17th century was a rough period for the Portuguese Empire, having ended the Iberian Union, through the Portuguese Restoration War, and then entered into the Dutch-Portuguese War. Because of the continuous military action throughout the empire, a large part of 17th-century Portuguese colonial architecture was that of building Baroque, scientifically designed fortifications. A good example of 17th-century Portuguese colonial military architecture is the Fort and Defensive Walls of the Colony of Santíssimo Sacramento. Typical of the era, Santíssimo Sacramento's fortifications surrounded the city completely and only had access three ways, two draw gates to the territory and the port of the city, as most Portuguese colonial cities were structured. The 17th century also saw a period of heightened urban planning in Portuguese colonial locations, sculpting the colonial cities and forts around the ideals and rationales of the Enlightenment.

Although the 17th century was a tumultuous time for the Portuguese Empire, filled with conflict, conquest, and confusion, a heightened religious zeal arose to support and justify the actions taken by Portuguese imperial forces. Religious Portuguese colonial architecture of the time was typified by grandeur and demonstration of religious importance and imperial wealth. The majority of churches and other religious buildings during this epoch were built in a transition phase between Mannerism and the Baroque. A good example of a Portuguese colonial church from the era is the Church of the Divine Providence of São Caetano, 1639, India. The church, which was a mannerist-baroque crossover, was ordered to be built by Pedro da Silva, Viceroy of India, to demonstrate Portuguese wealth and the integration of the territory as an important Portuguese colony. Many Portuguese colonial churches of the 17th century were constructed to present power and wealth of the Portuguese Empire over an area, apart from religious uses, and the more important the colony the better designed and grander the church or monastery.

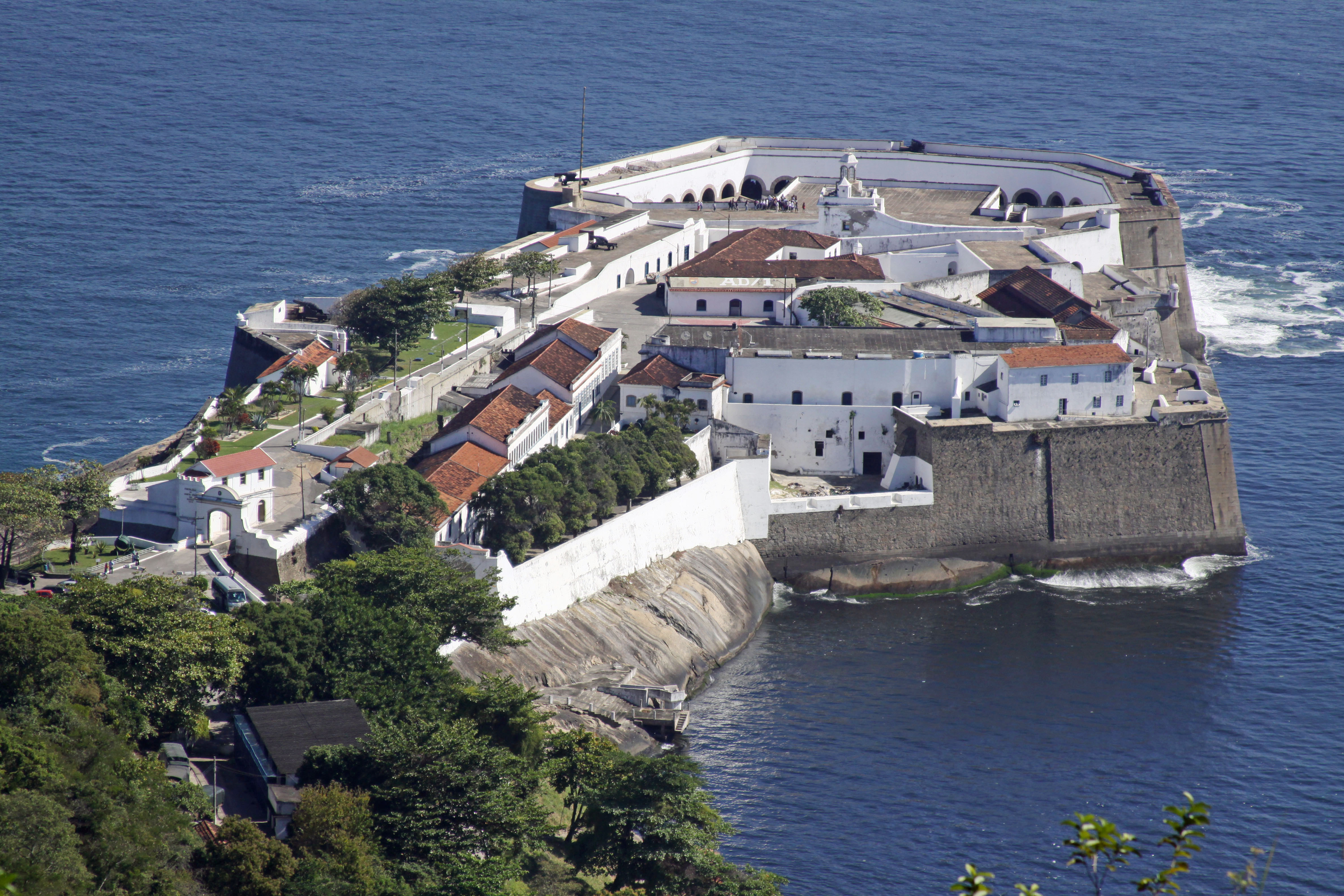
Fort of S. Cruz da Barra;
b. 1612, Brazil

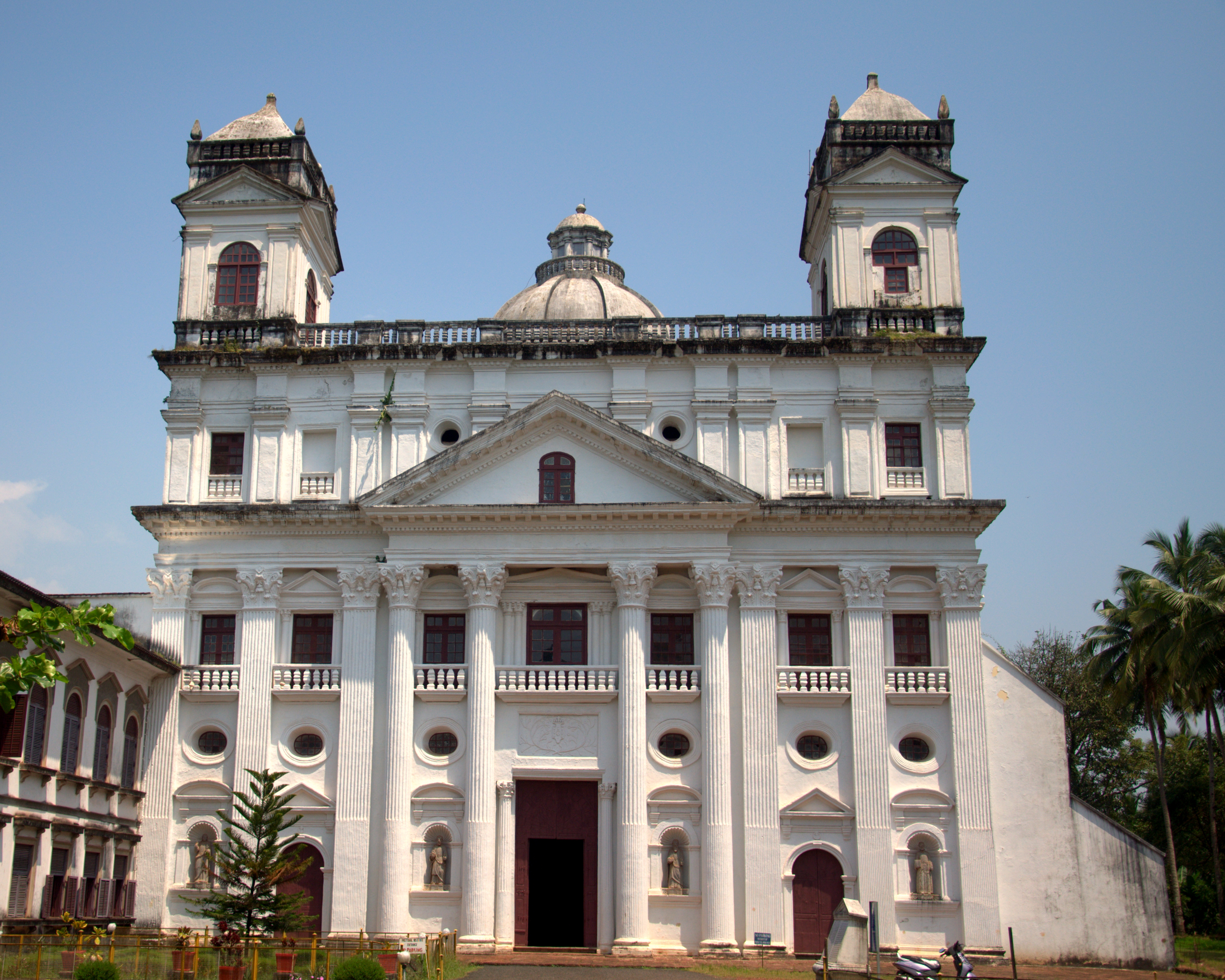
Church of São Caetano;
b. 1639, India

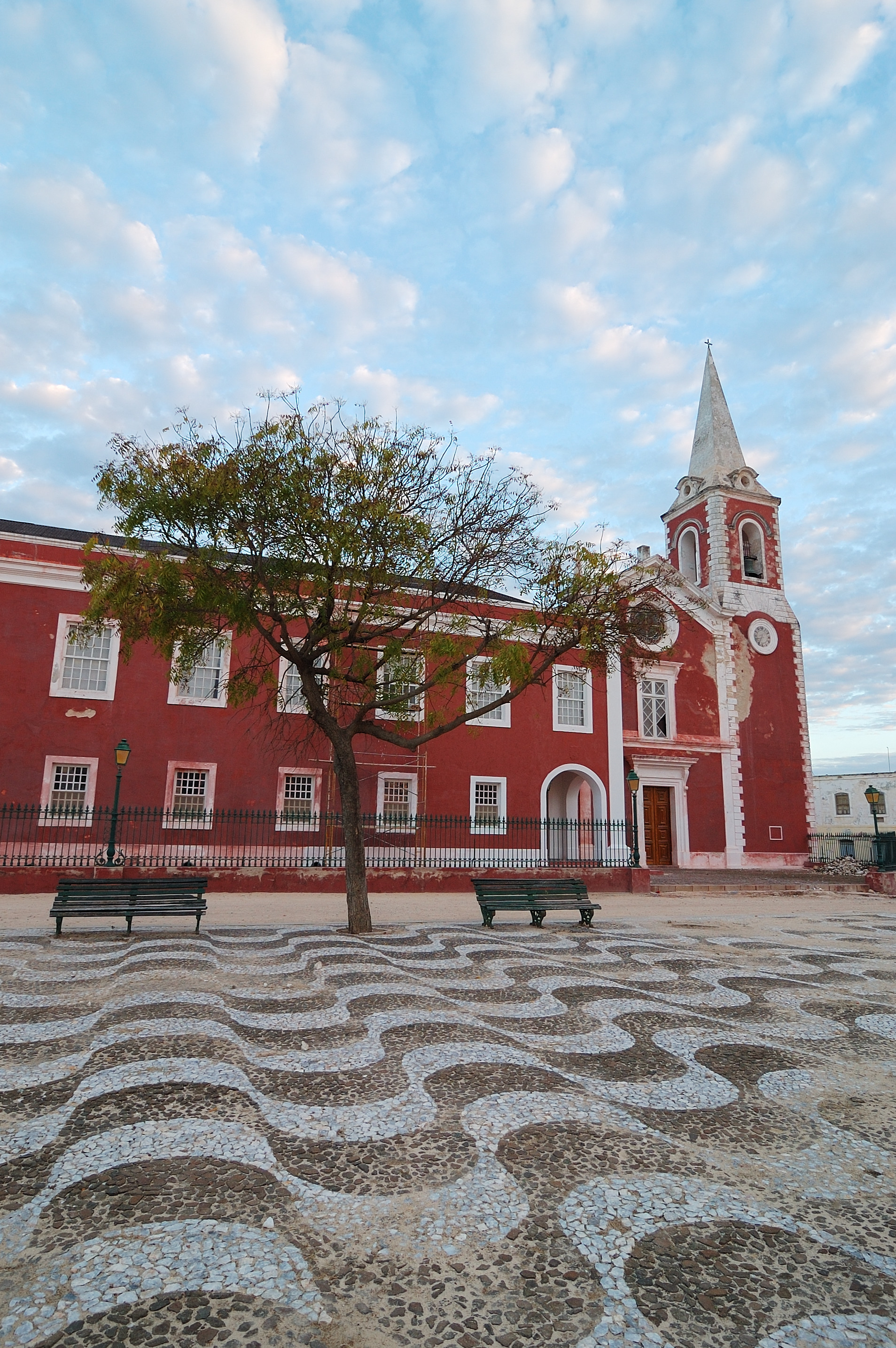
Governor's Palace;
b. 1610, Mozambique

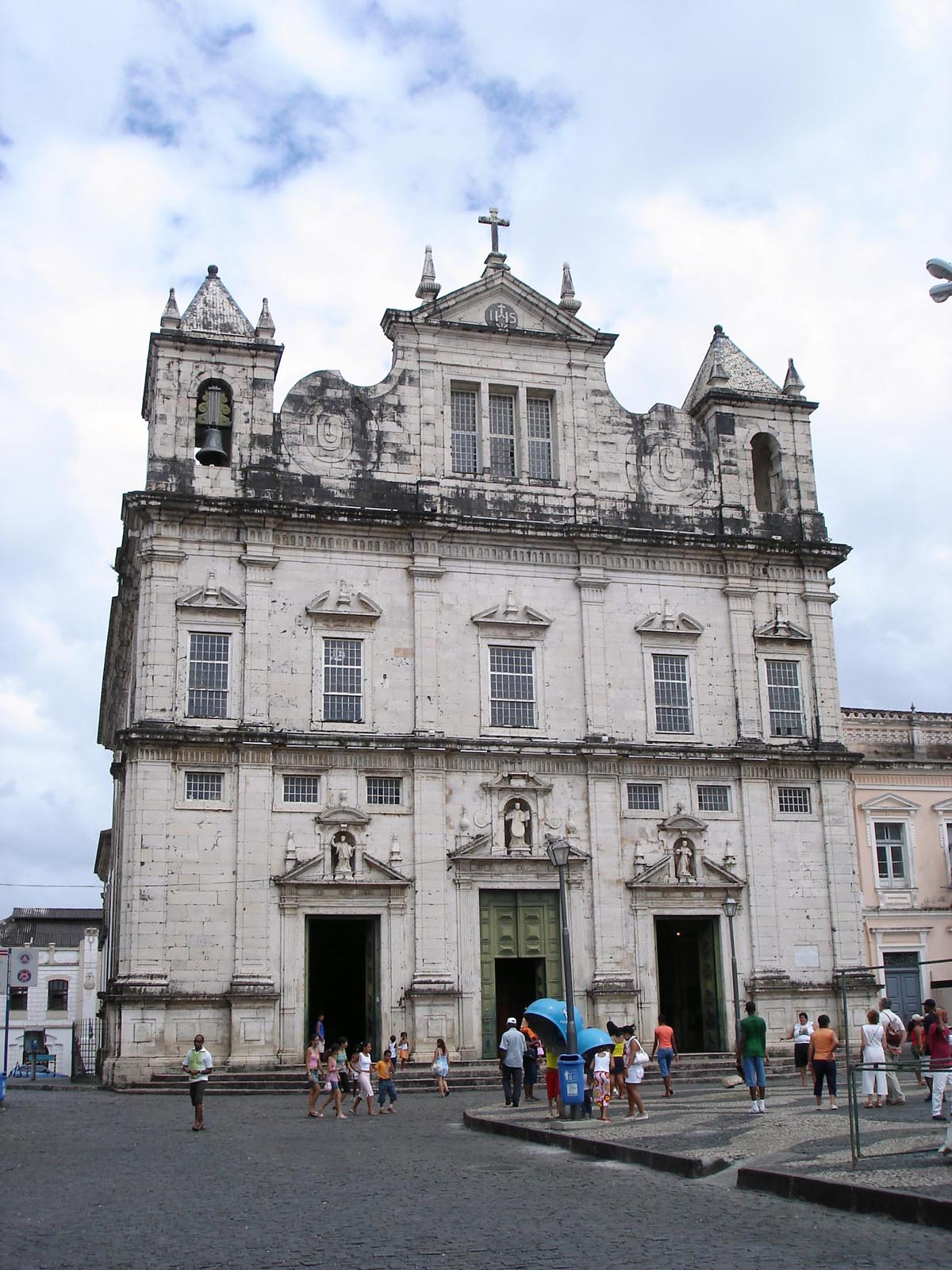
Cathedral of Salvador;
b. 1676, Brazil

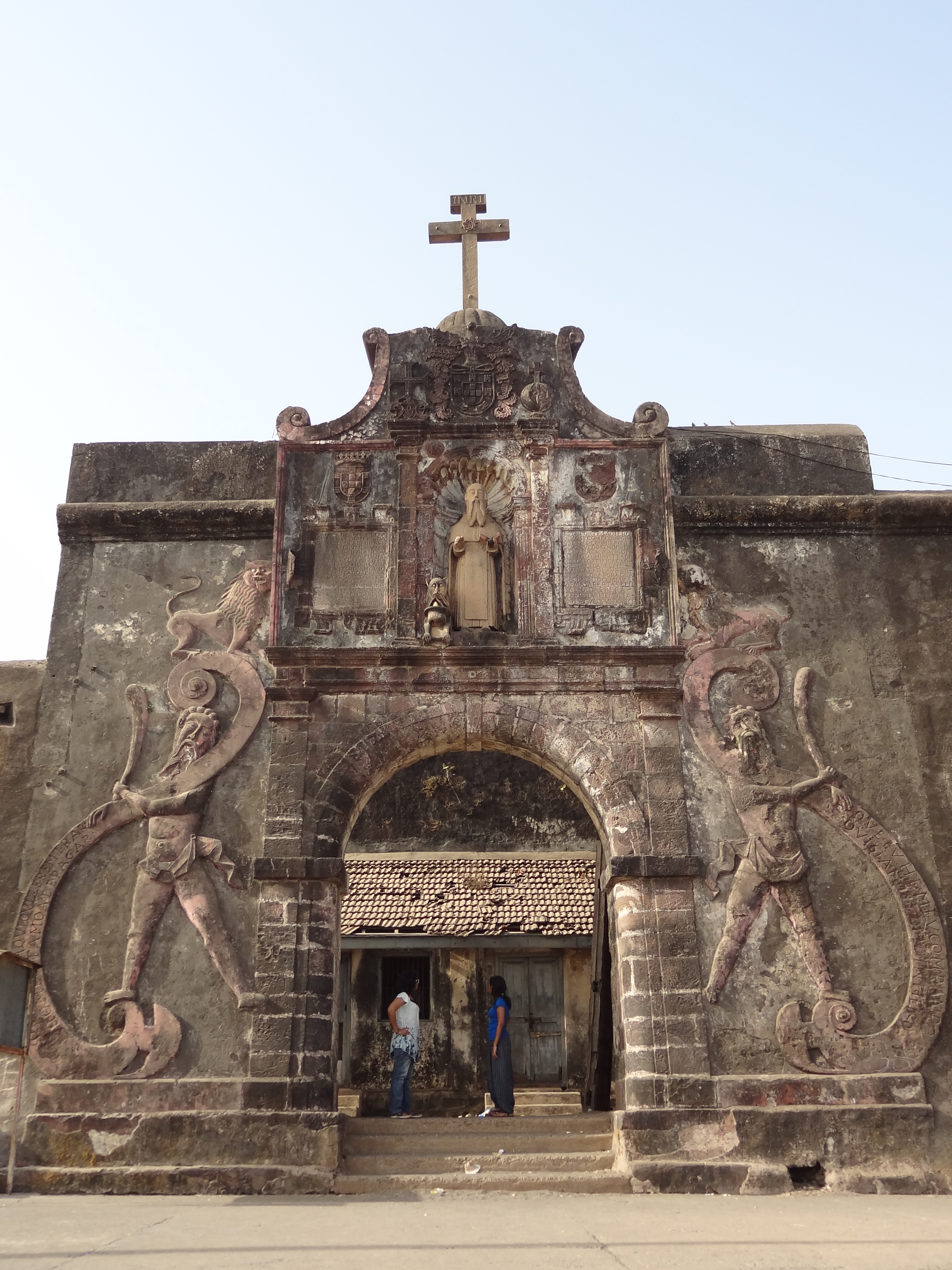
Fort of São Jerônimo;
b. 1614, India

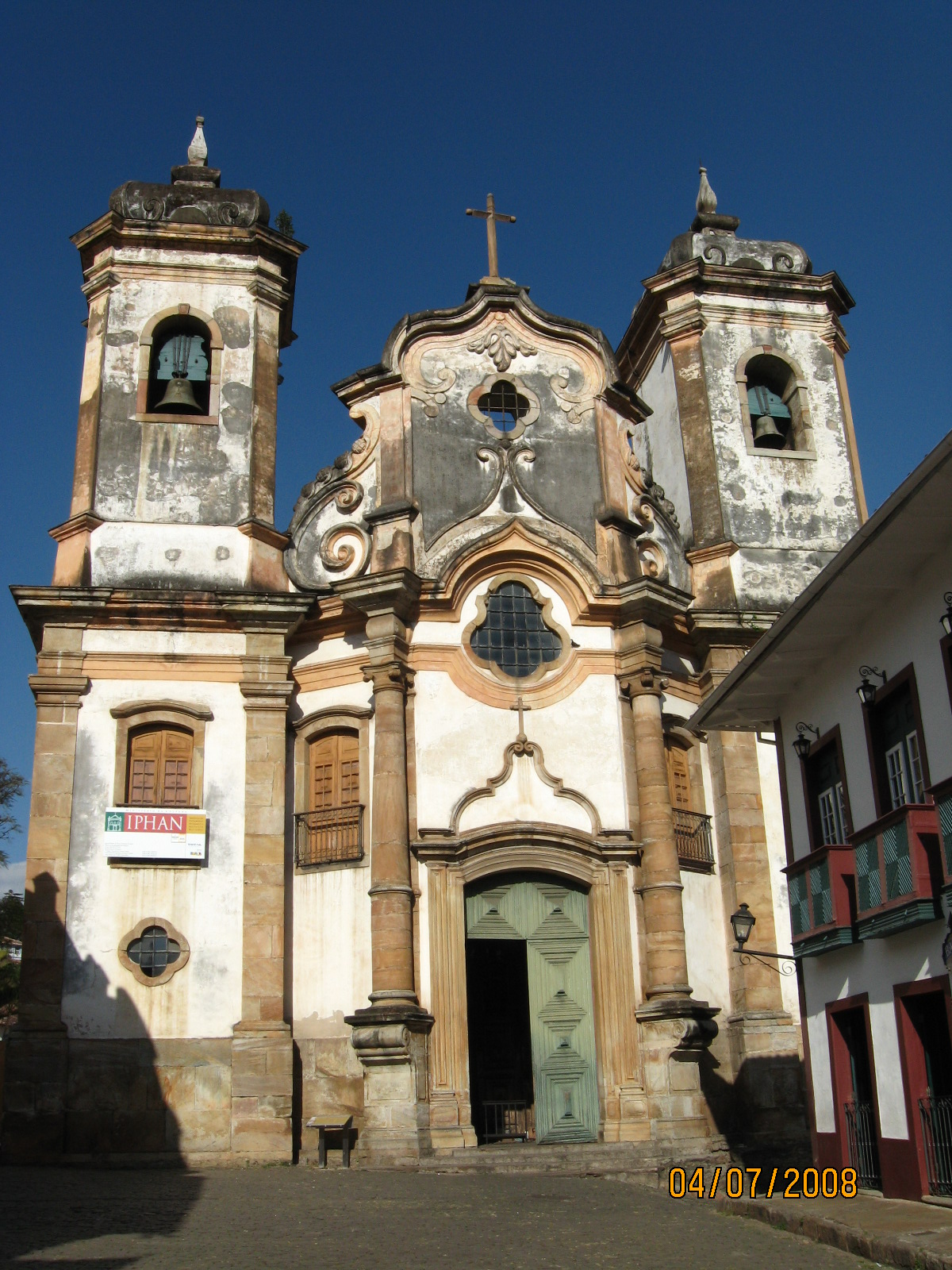
Church of N. S. do Pilar;
b. 1696, Brazil

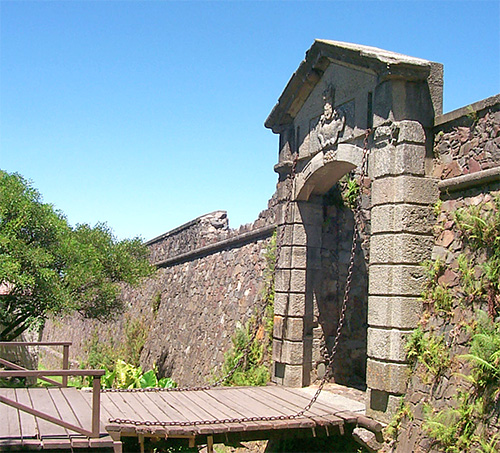
Fort of St. Sacramento;
b. 1680, Uruguay

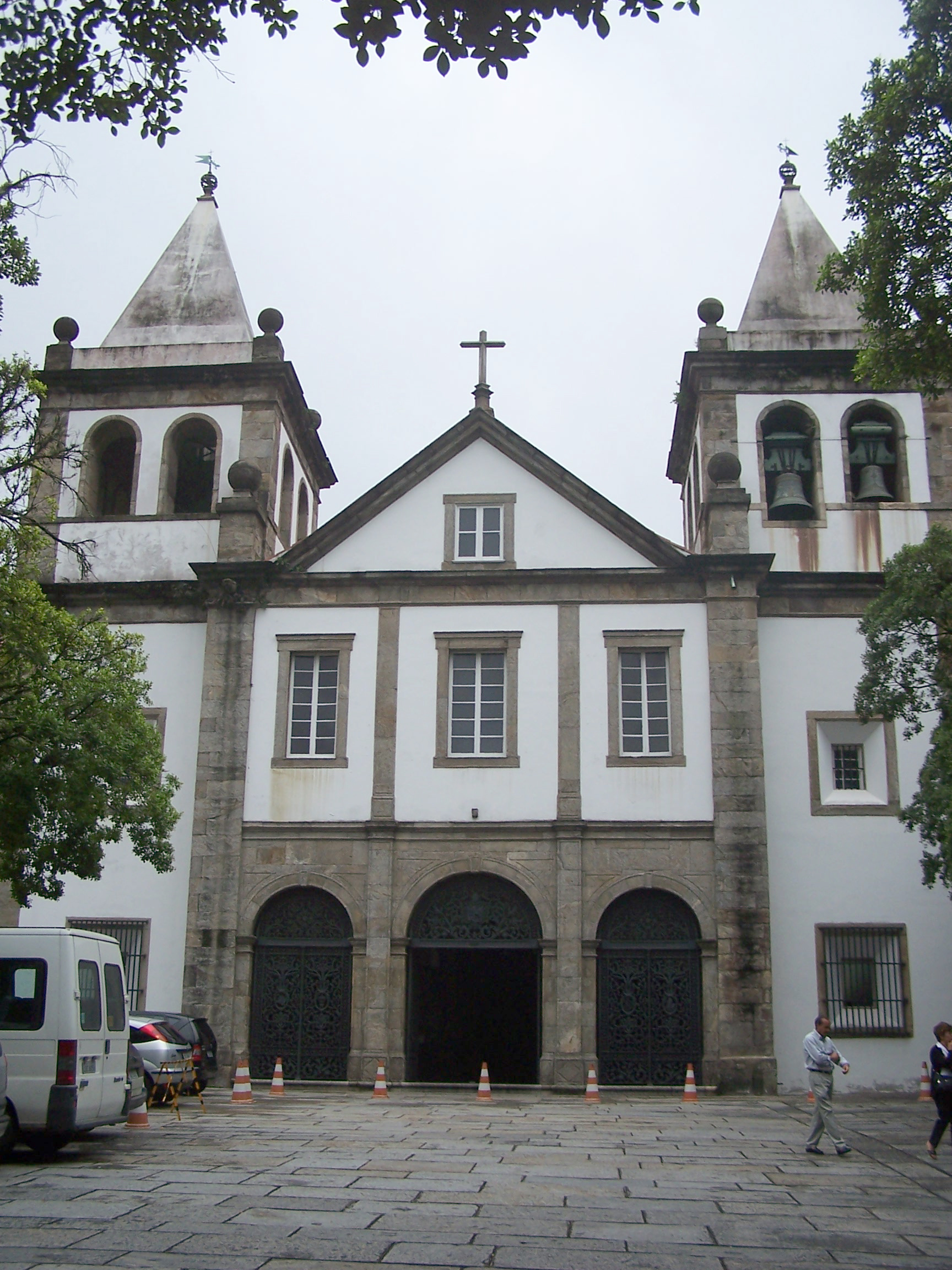
São Bento Monastery
b. 1633, Brazil

== 18th century ==
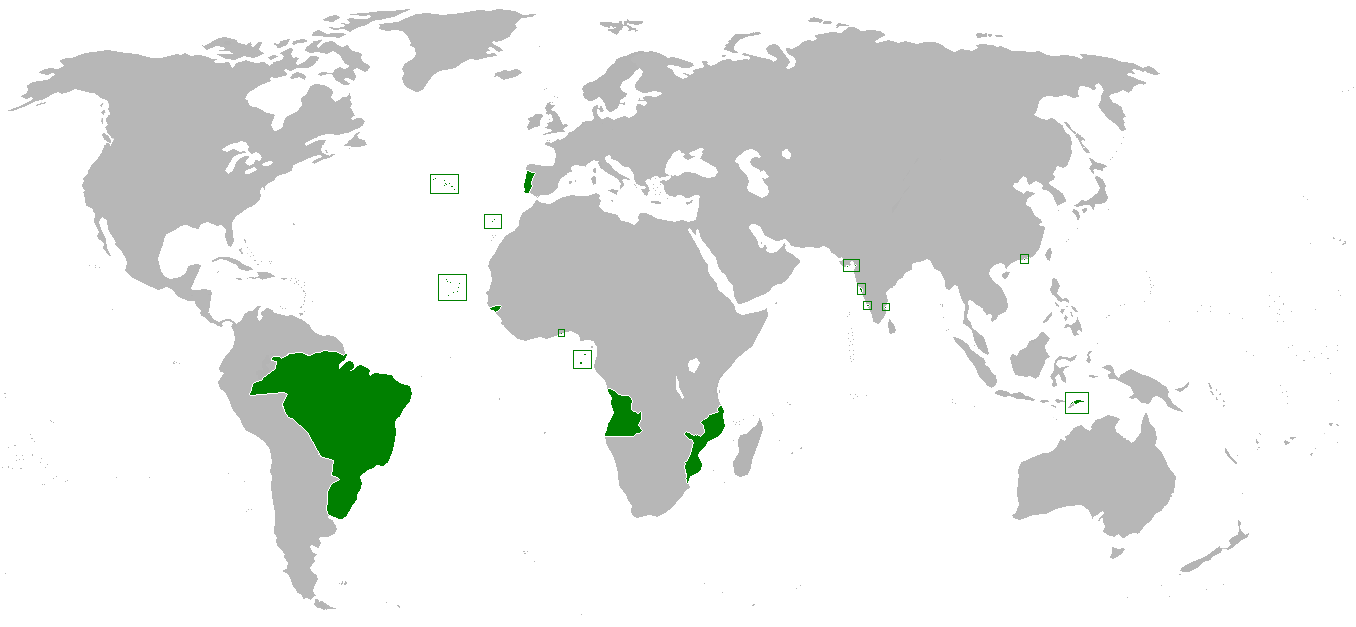
The Portuguese Empire at the end of the 18th century

The 18th century was an epoch of great expansion in the Portuguese Empire. In Portuguese America, the State of Brazil and the State of Maranhão expanded westward, leading to the restructuration of Maranhão into the mega-colony State of Grão-Pará and Maranhão, in 1751. In 1772, Portuguese America, once again, expanded and restructured, splitting the State of Grão-Pará and Maranhão into the State of Grão-Pará and Rio Negro and the State of Maranhão and Piauí. Meanwhile, the Colony of Santíssimo Sacramento was disputed between the Portuguese and the Spanish for the major part of the century, creating uneasy conditions in that colony. In Portuguese India, territorial conquest and diplomacy created the Colony of Dadrá e Nagar-Aveli, 1779. In Portuguese Africa, imperial holdings expanded up the eastern continental coast with the reconquest of Mombaça, 1728, which had been lost in 1698. The 1755 Lisbon earthquake devastated the Kingdom of Portugal and its capital of Lisbon, and thus most imperial funds went to metropolitan Portugal to rebuild the wrecked capital and its realms. The loss of some funds hindered Portuguese colonial architecture in the 18th century initially, but the great gold mines of Portuguese America, and the lucrative slave trade of Portuguese Africa, allowed a period of relative wealth and fostered the arts.

During the 18th, Portuguese colonial military architecture grew at a steady rate, with scientific breakthroughs and engineering advancements, but it is overshadowed by the new height for Portuguese Colonial civic architecture, which expanded due to the time of peace and great wealth for the Portuguese Empire. During the epoch, Northern Portuguese Baroque, a style that originated from the Porto and Beira regions of northern Portugal, became the preferred style for Portuguese colonial civic architecture. It was in the 18th century that the Portuguese colonies in South America gained their importance within the empire, through newly found gold and diamonds, and many great palaces, public buildings, and monuments were created, including the Passeio Público, 1779, the oldest public park in the Americas. A good example for a Portuguese colonial civic building from the era is the Palace of the Viceroys of Brazil, in Rio de Janeiro. Built in 1738, for the Viceroy of State of Brazil, the palace typifies the style of Portuguese colonial baroque in civic use, with its white-washed exterior walls and simple grey stone baroque windows and portals.

Similar in Portuguese colonial civic architecture, the religious counterpart largely used the Northern Portuguese Baroque style as the basis for most architectural projects. Colonial churches of the era saw a period of never before seen lavishness and excess. Richly ornate Baroque exteriors of grey and brown stone on white washed walls were equaled in high design with their gold gilded interiors with intricately painted ceilings and azulejos. A typification of Portuguese colonial religious architecture of the era is the Church of São Francisco de Assis, in Ouro Preto. Designed by the famous Portuguese colonial architect Antônio Francisco Lisboa, the church proclaims to its visitors the wealth of the Portuguese Empire and God's blessing over it, by giving it access to the vast riches of colonial Brazil. The ornate double-storied portal is typical of the epoch, while the rounded plan of the church is unique to Portuguese Colonial architecture in Brazil. The baroque rounded tops that flatten out at the end are common amongst all Portuguese colonial architecture, both religious and civic, and both in Brazil and in the rest of the Portuguese Empire.

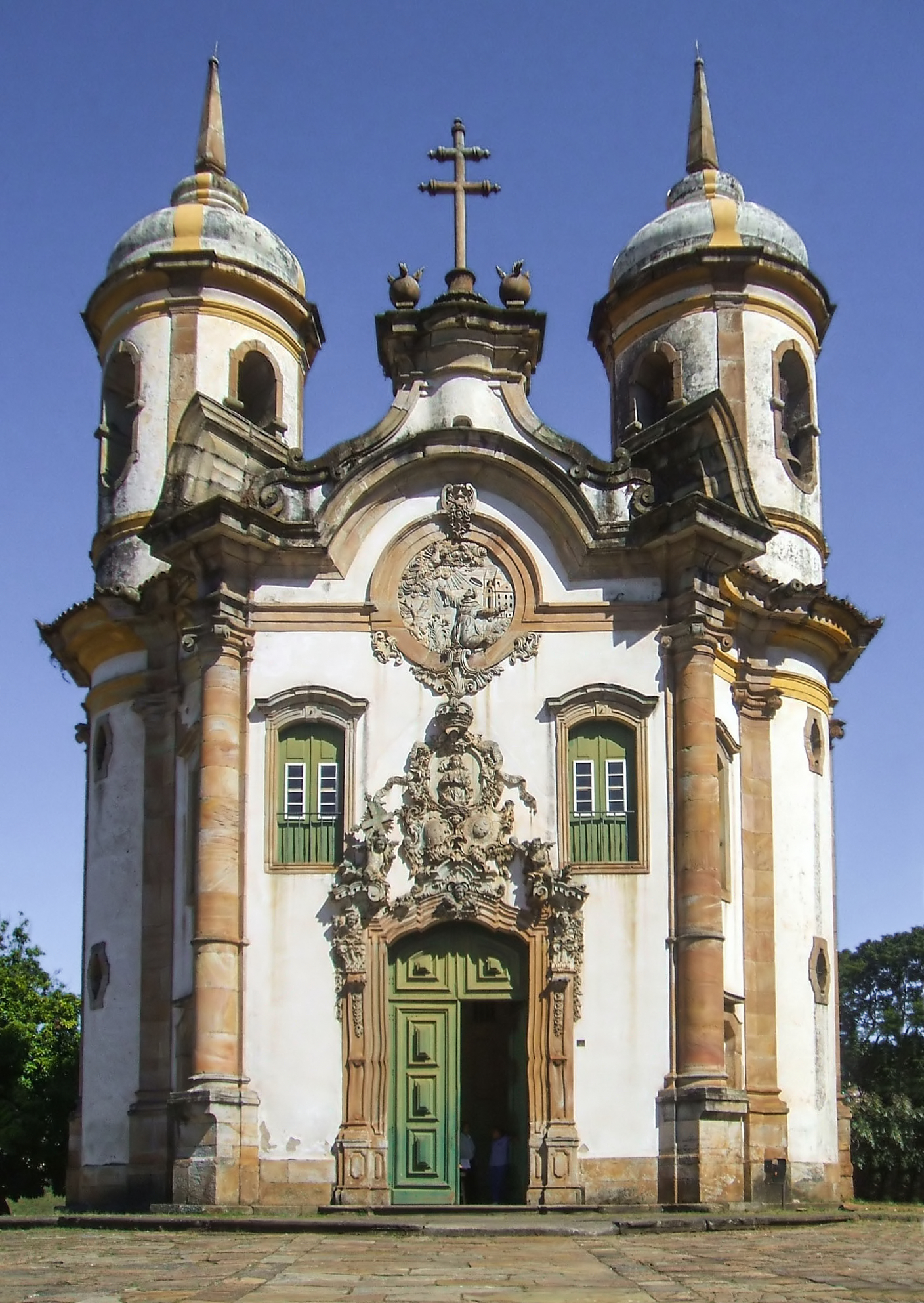
Church of S. Francisco;
b. 1766, Brazil

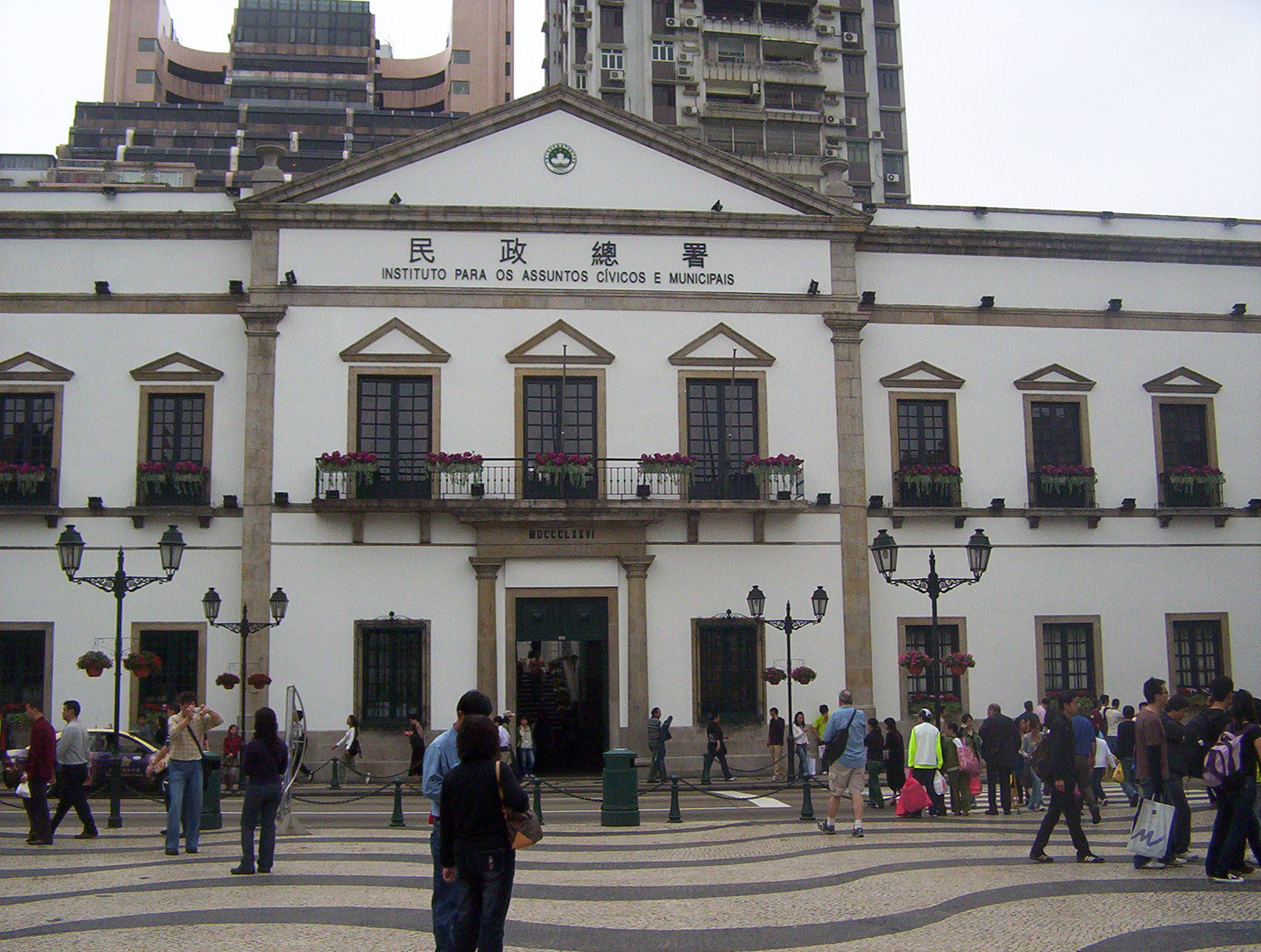
Leal Senado Building
b. 1784, Macau

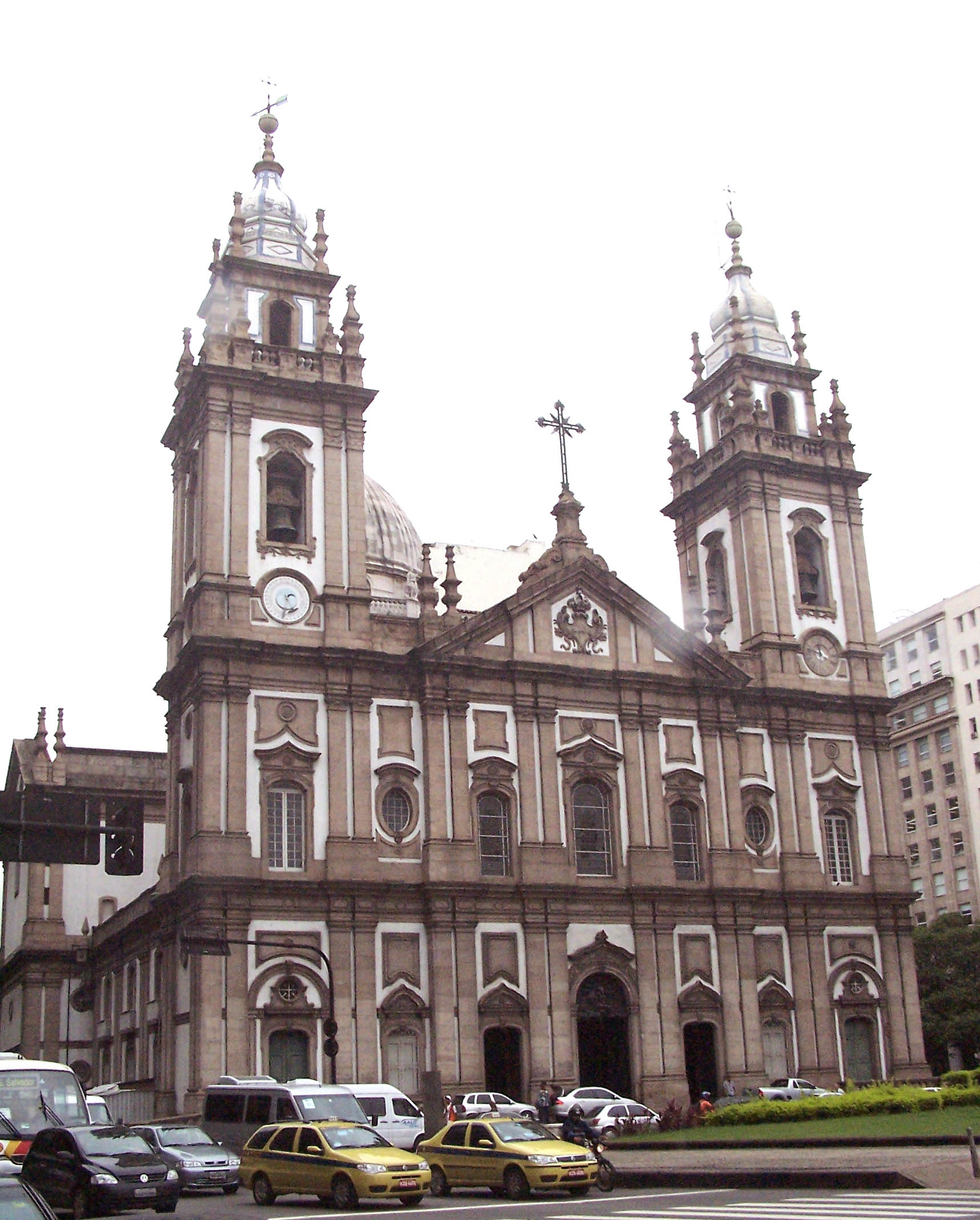
N. S. of Candelária Church;
b. 1775, Brazil

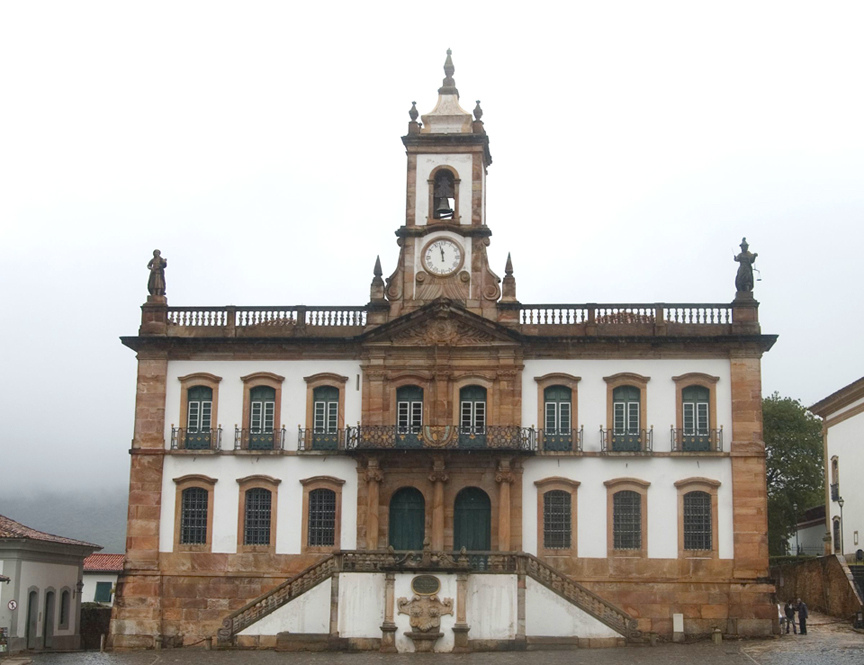
Ouro Preto City Hall;
b. 1780, Brazil

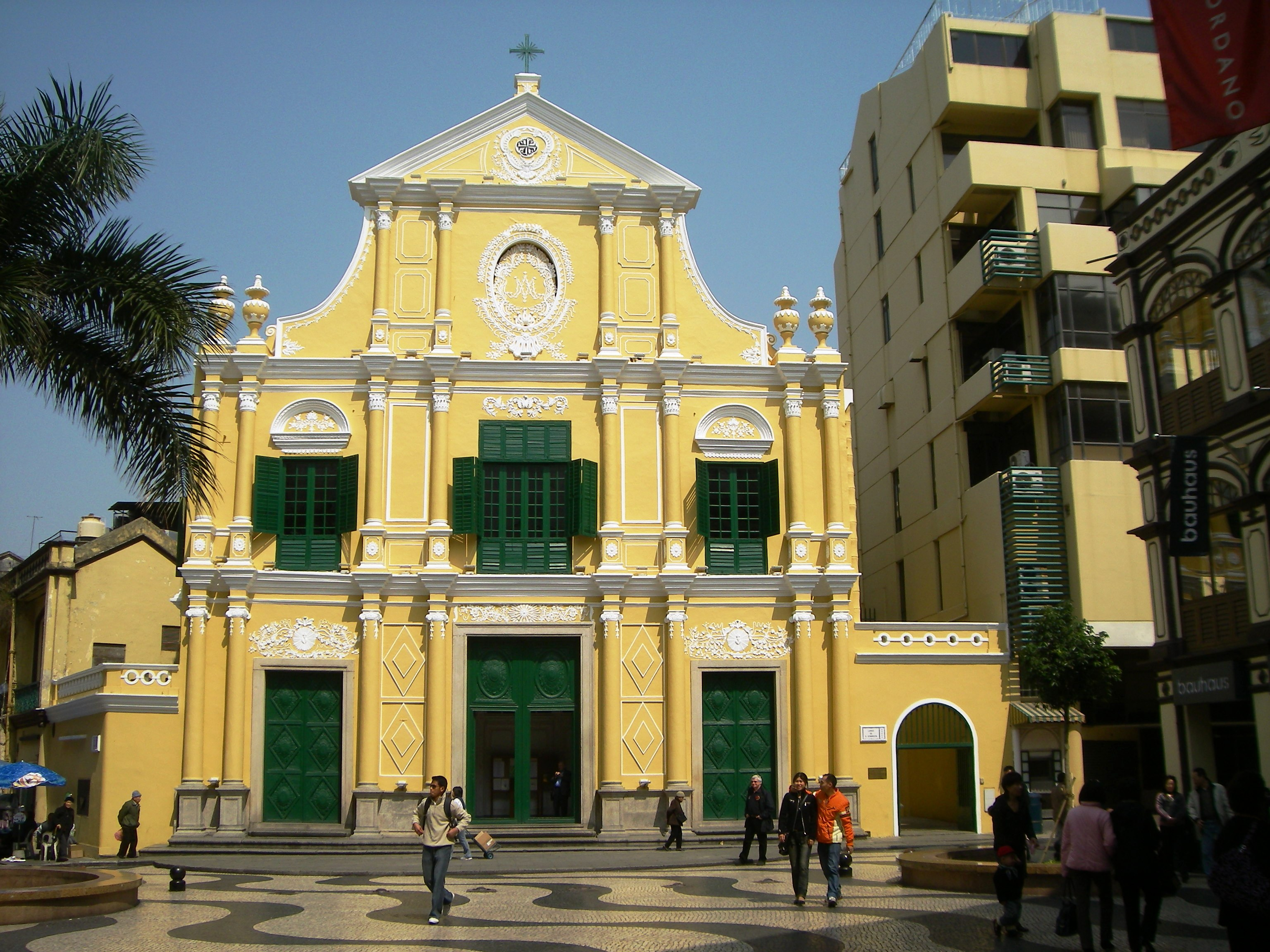
Church of S. Domingos;
b. 1707, Macau

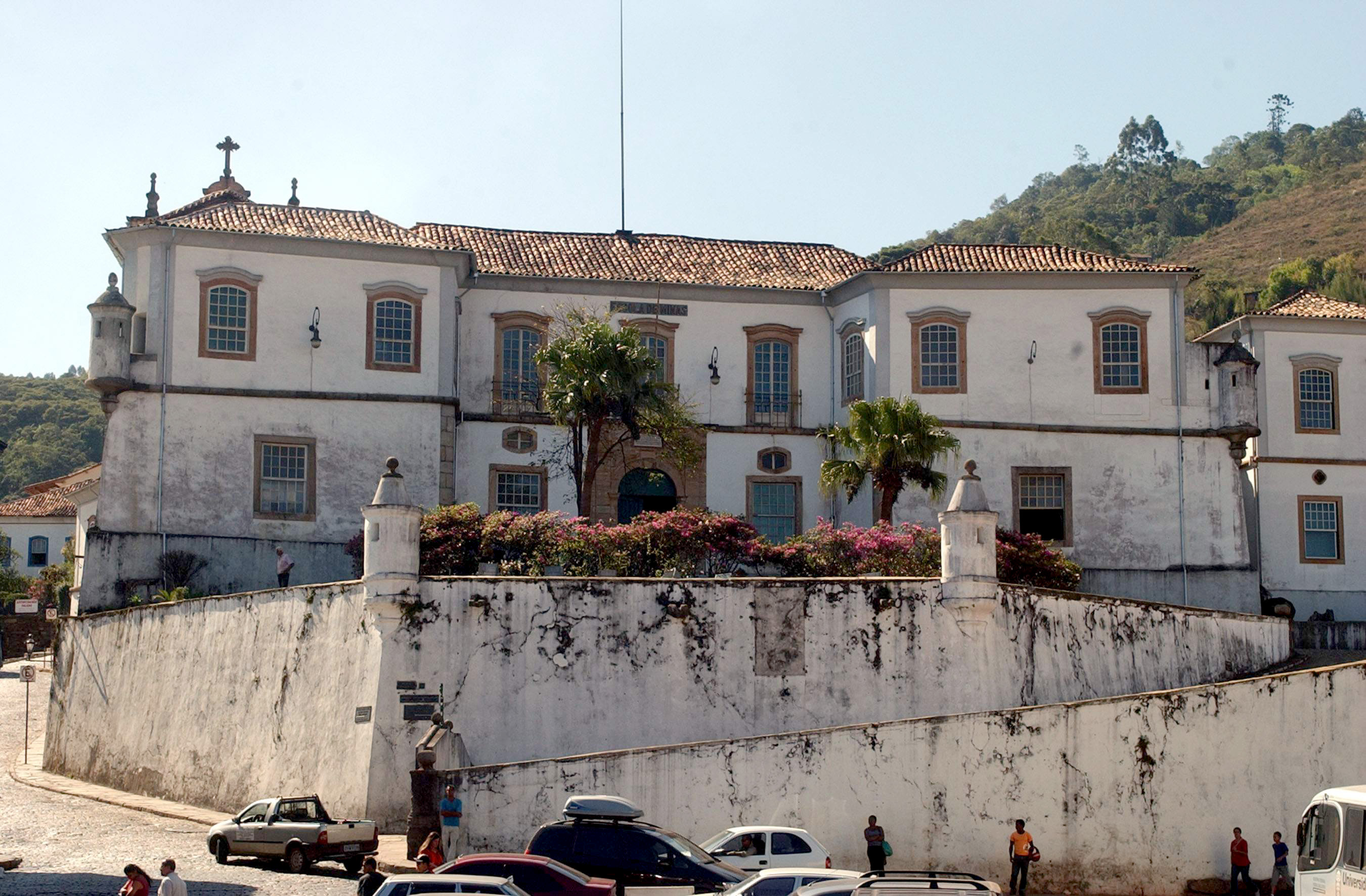
Palace of the Governors;
b. 1714, Brazil

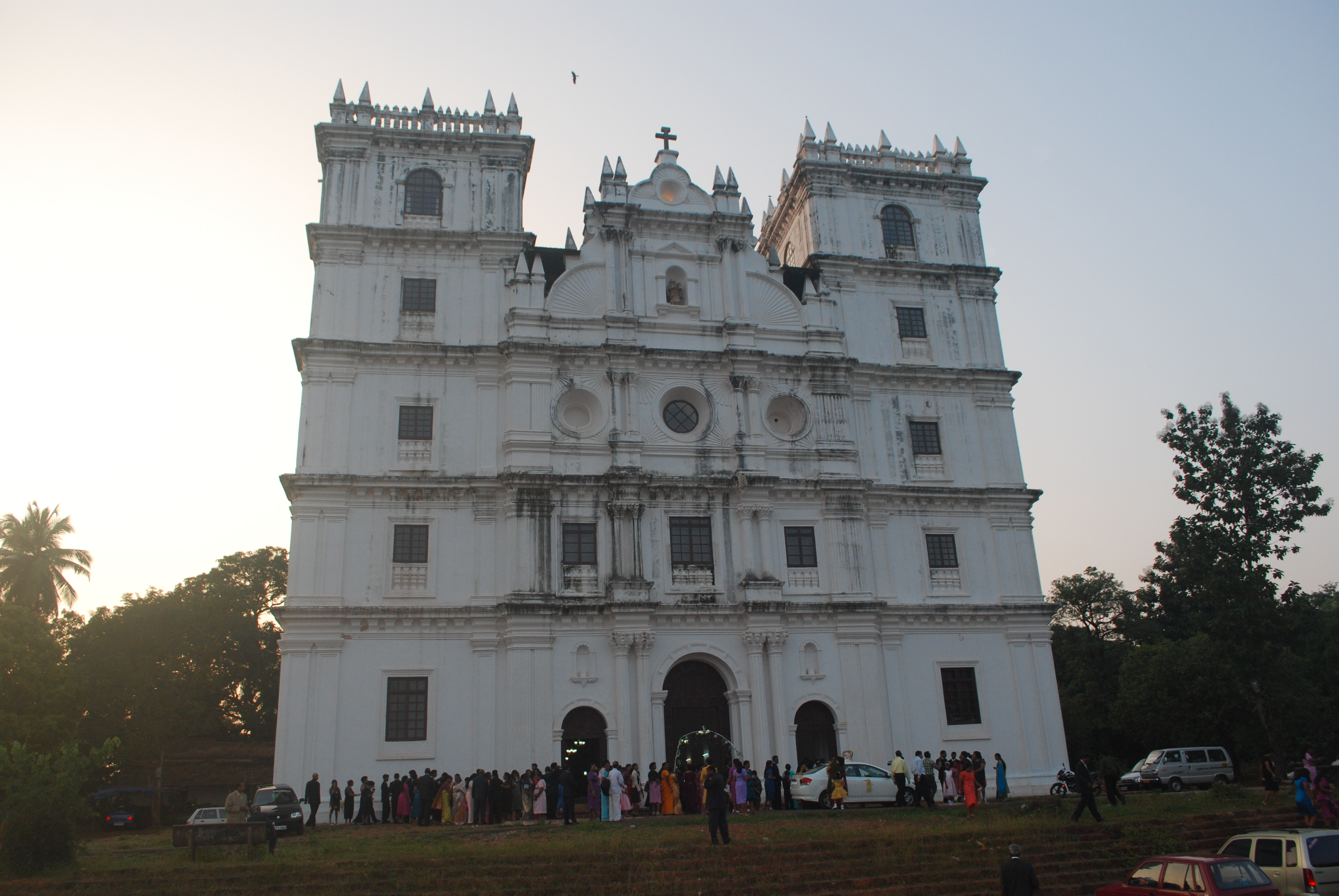
Church of Santa Ana;
b. 1707, Goa

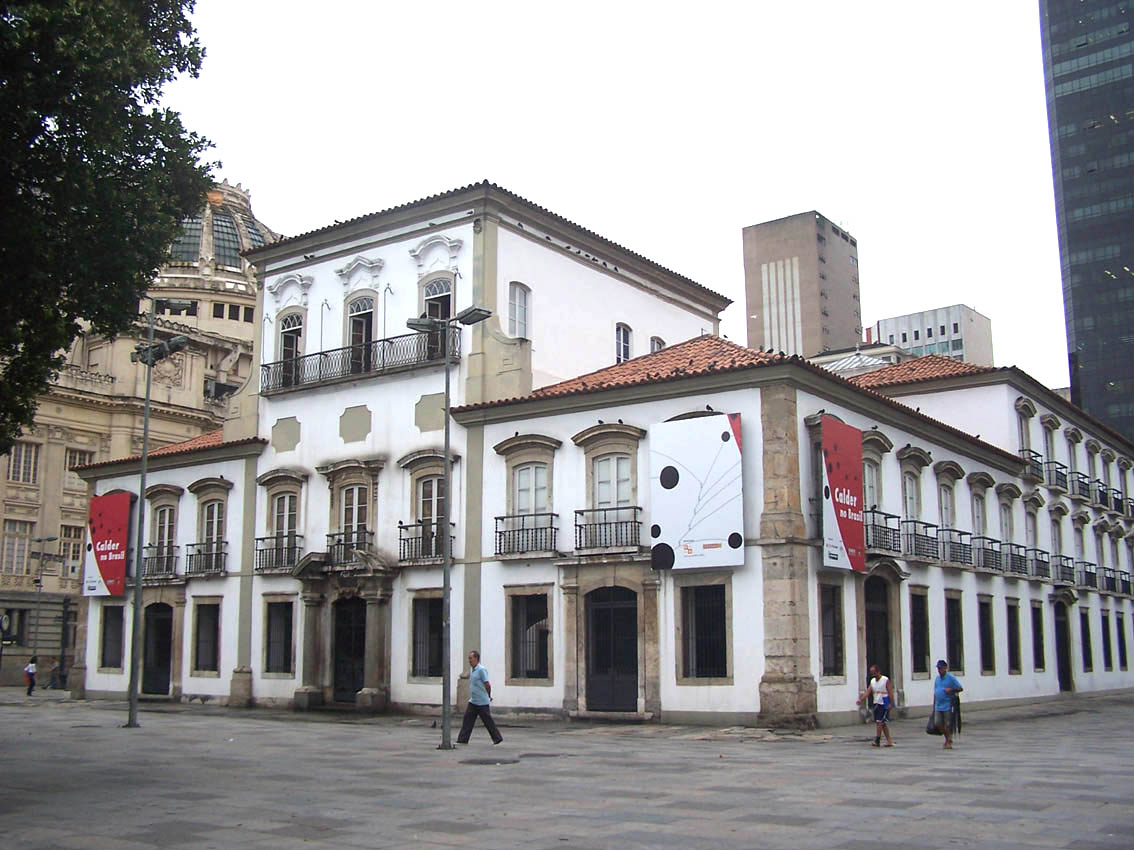
Palace of the Viceroys;
b. 1743, Brazil

== 19th century ==
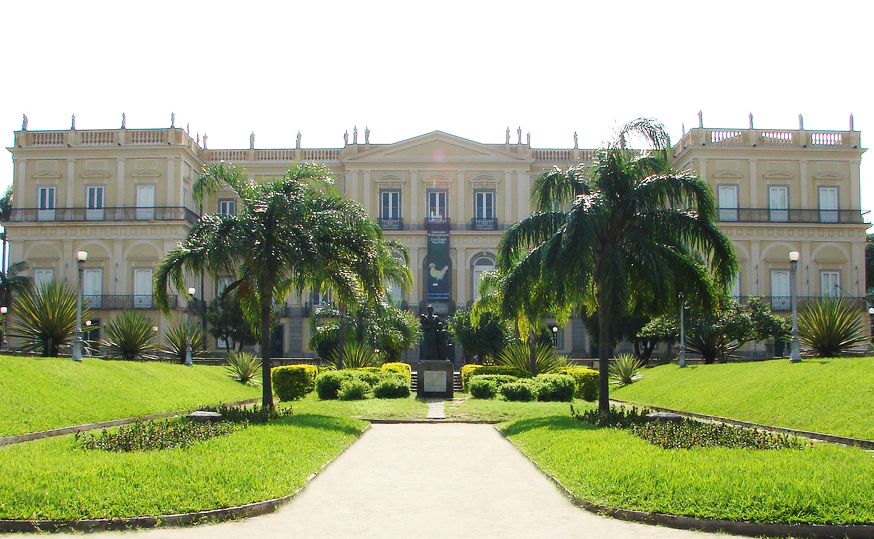
São Cristovão Royal Palace;
b. 1816, Brazil

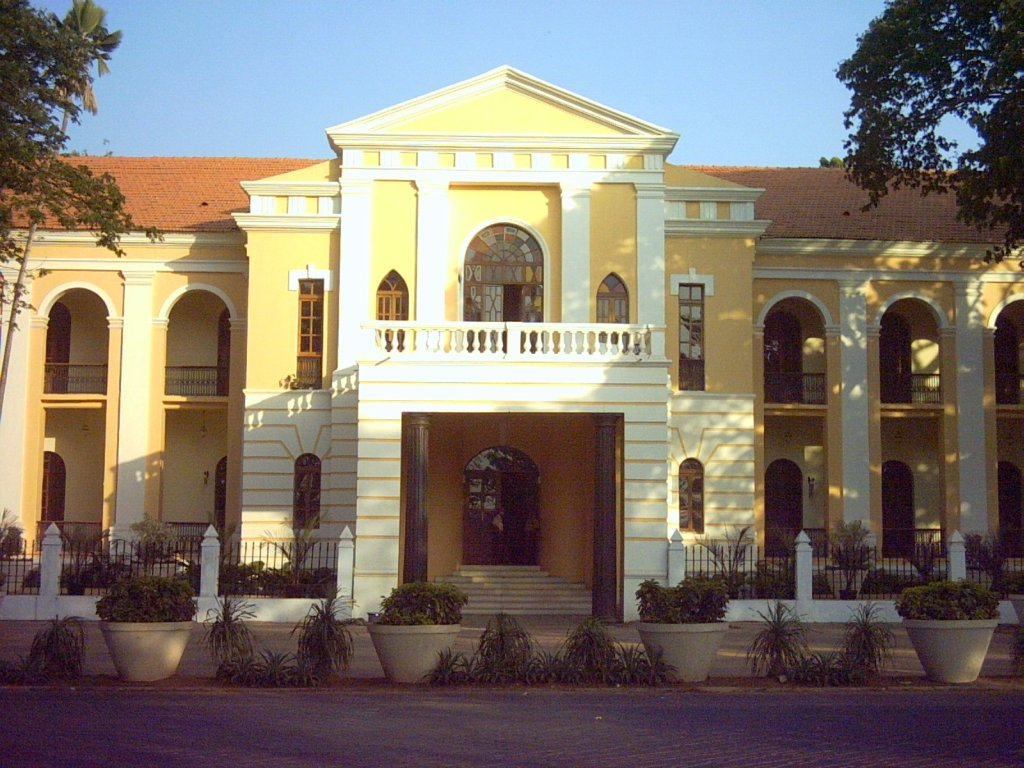
Goa Medical College;
b. 1842, India

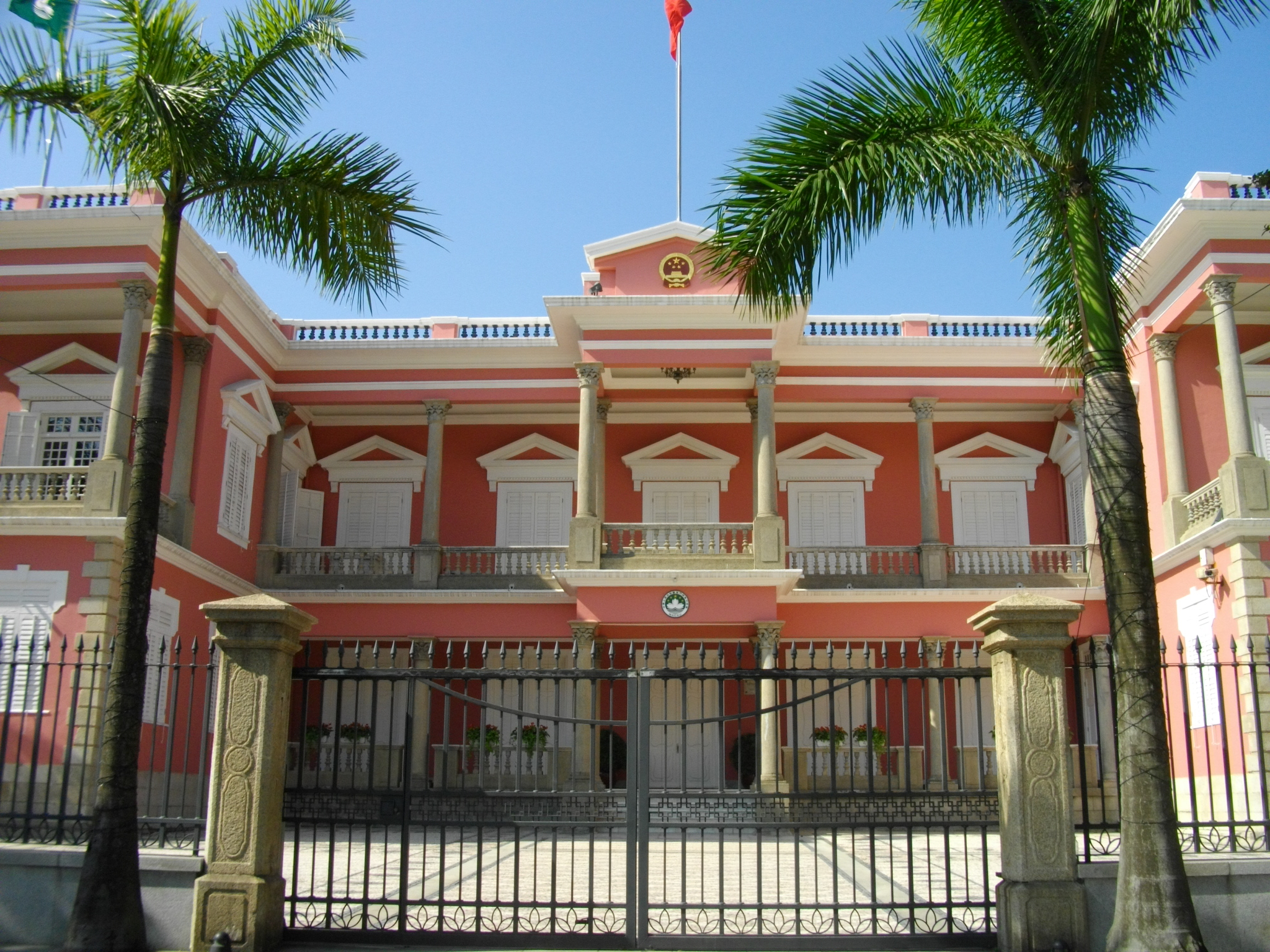
Macau Government Headquarters;
b. 1849, Macau

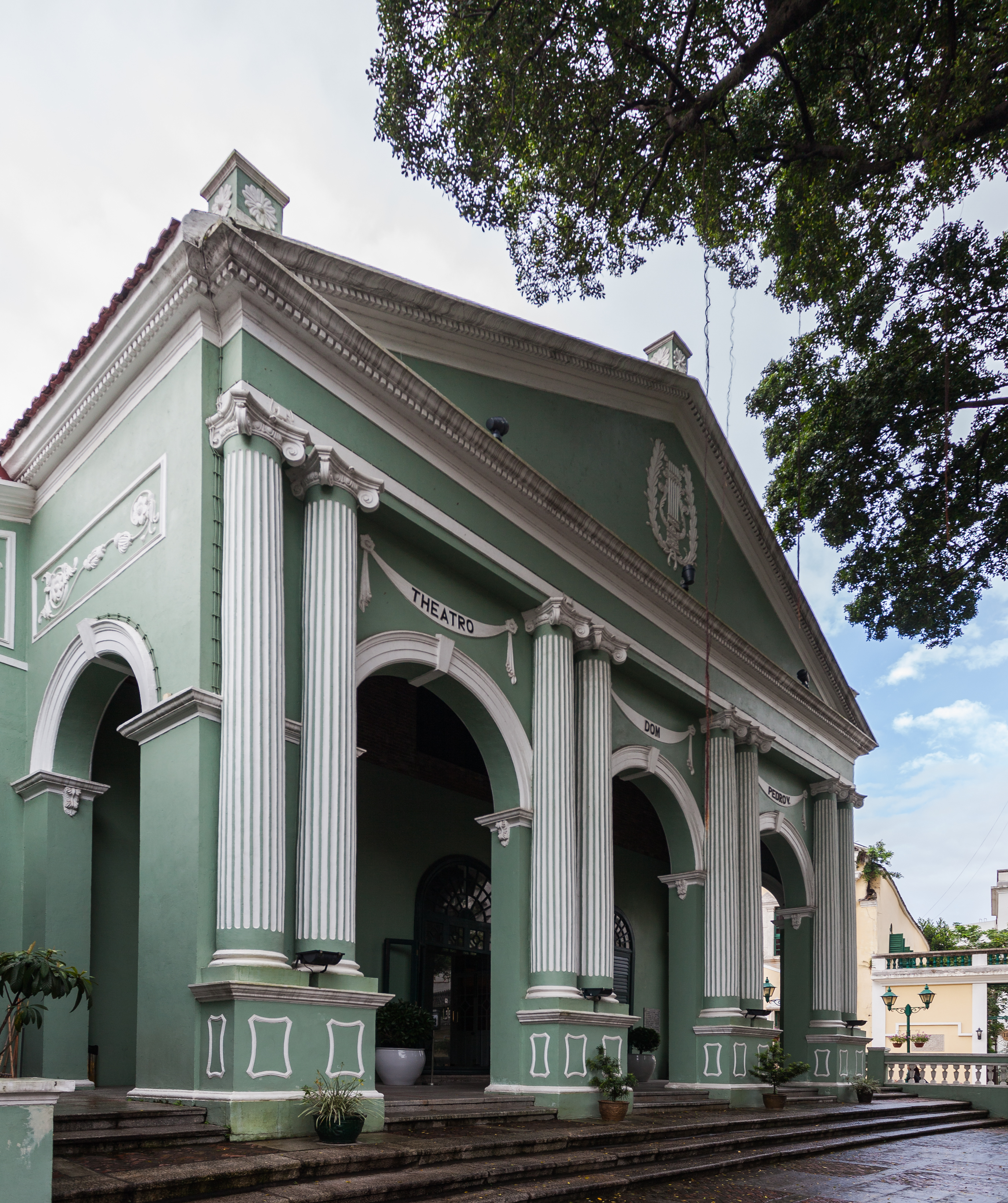
Dom Pedro V Theatre;
b. 1860, Macau

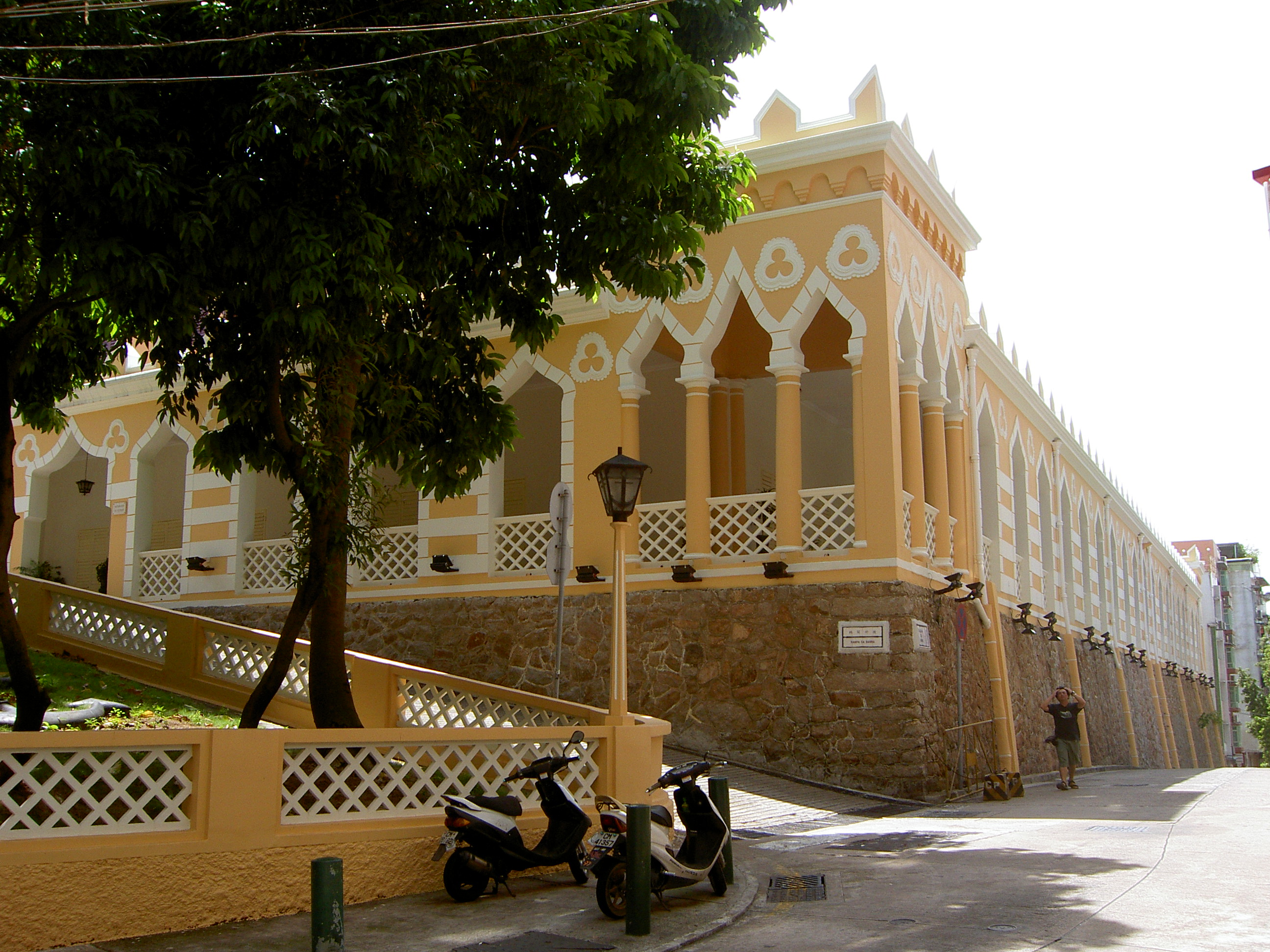
Moorish Barracks;
b. 1874, Macau

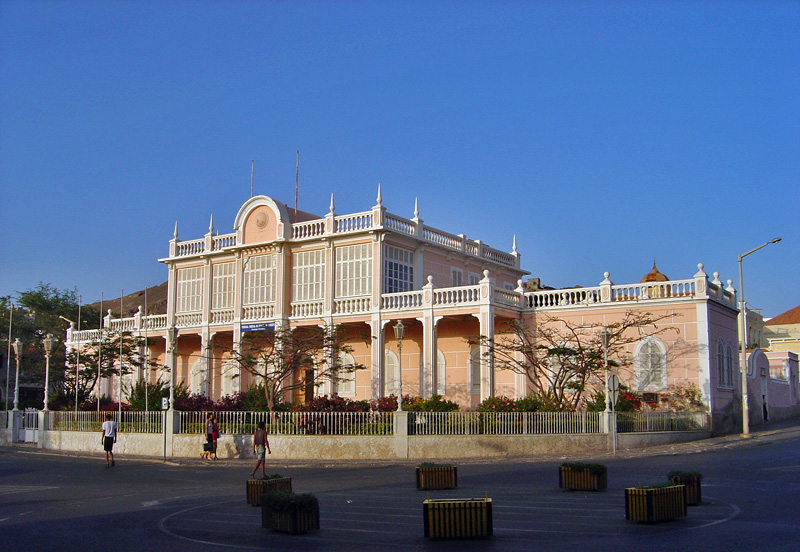
Palácio do Povo, Mindelo;
b. 1874, Cape Verde

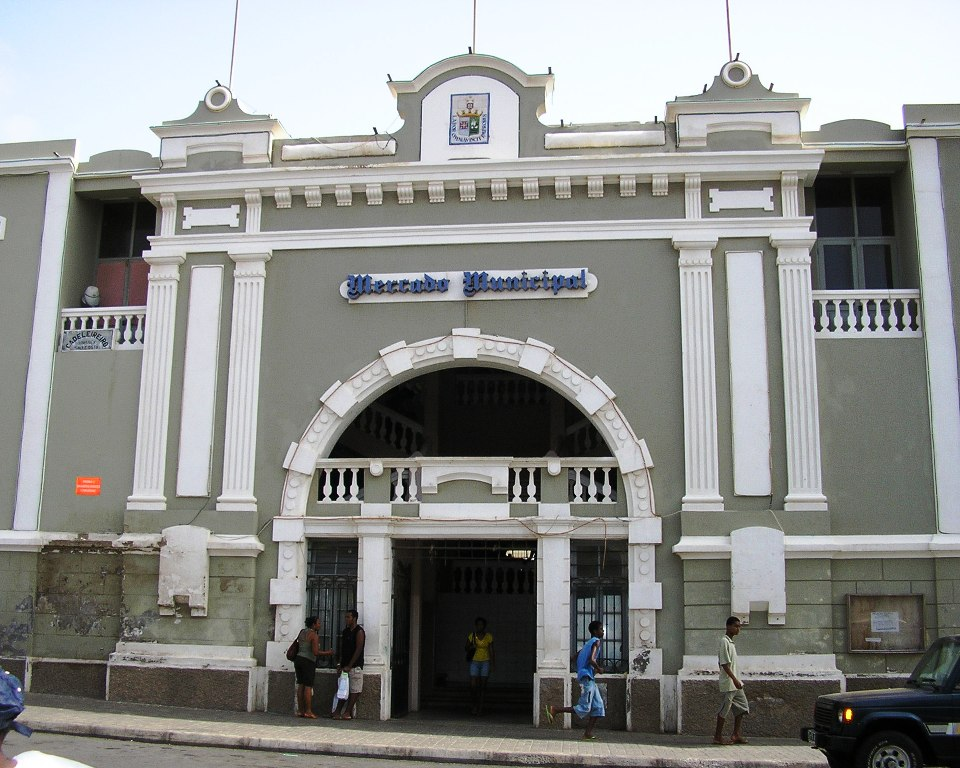
Mindelo Market;
1878, Cabo Verde

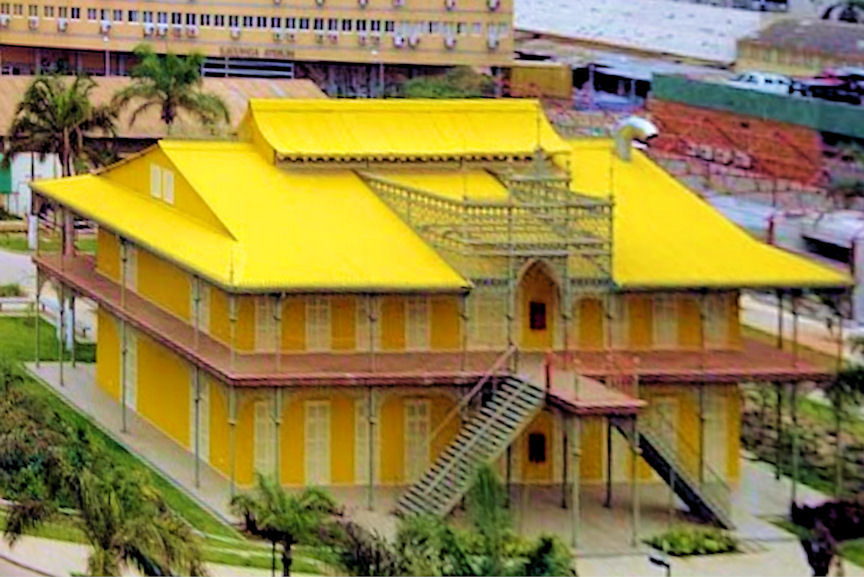
Palácio de Ferro;
b. 1885, Angola

== 20th century ==
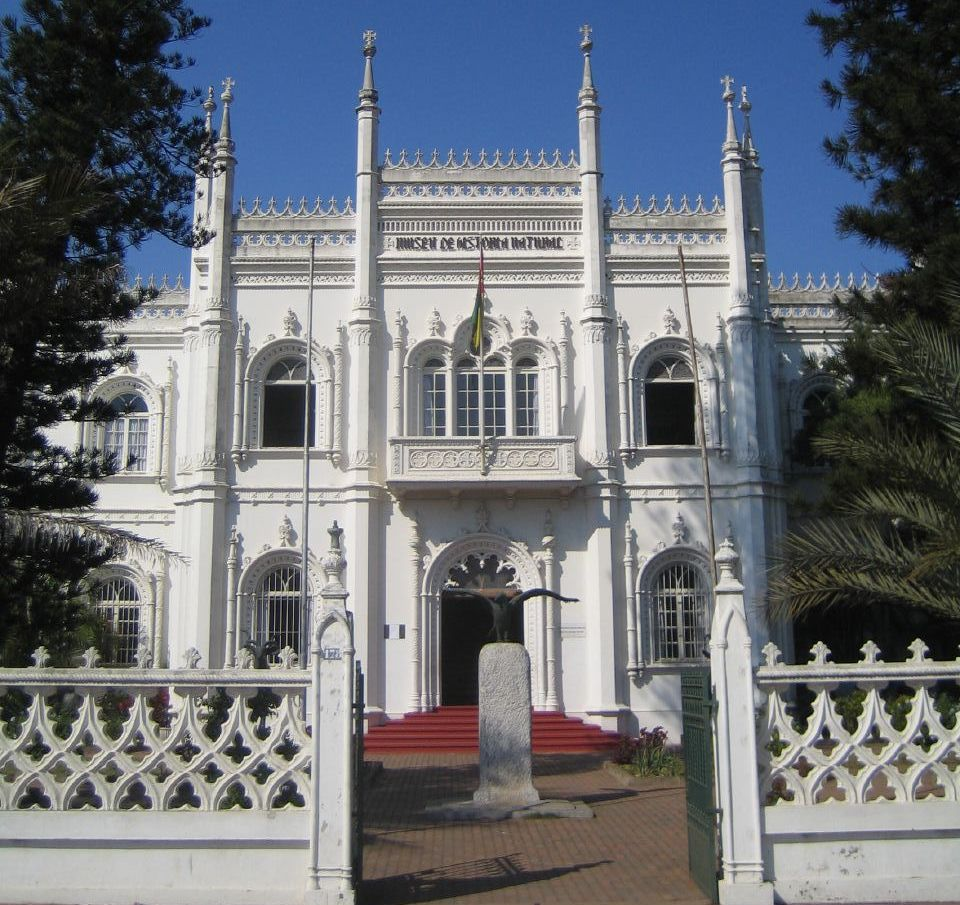
Natural History Museum;
b. 1913, Mozambique

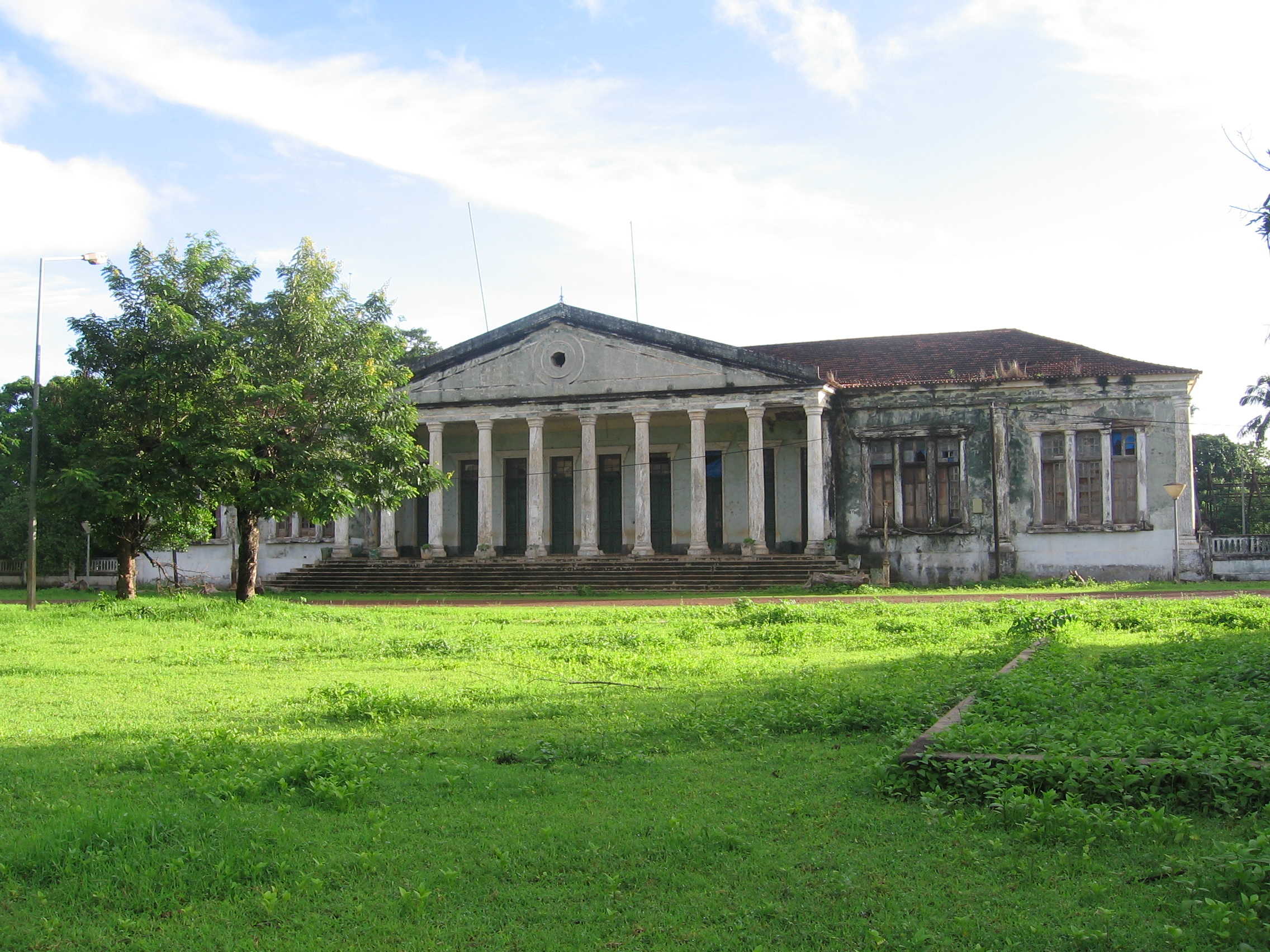
Bolama City Hall
b. 1919, Guinea-Bissau

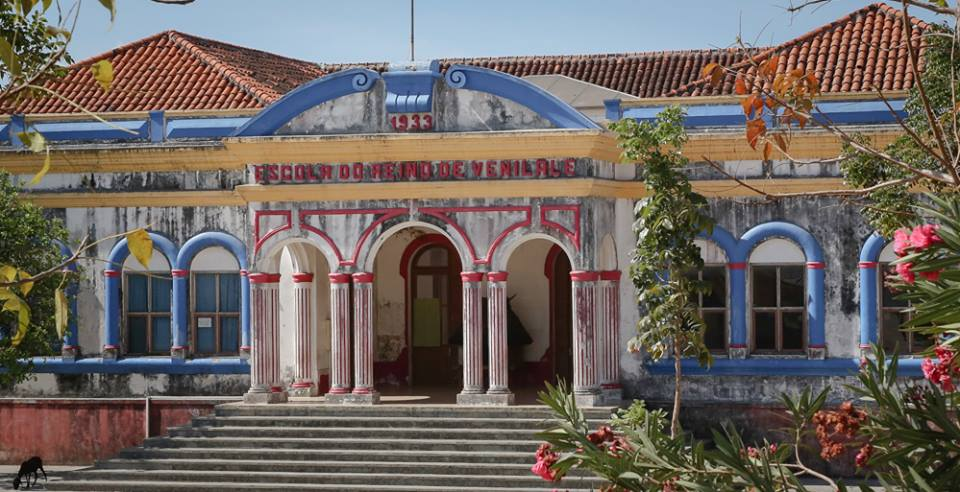
Venilale School;
b. 1933, East Timor

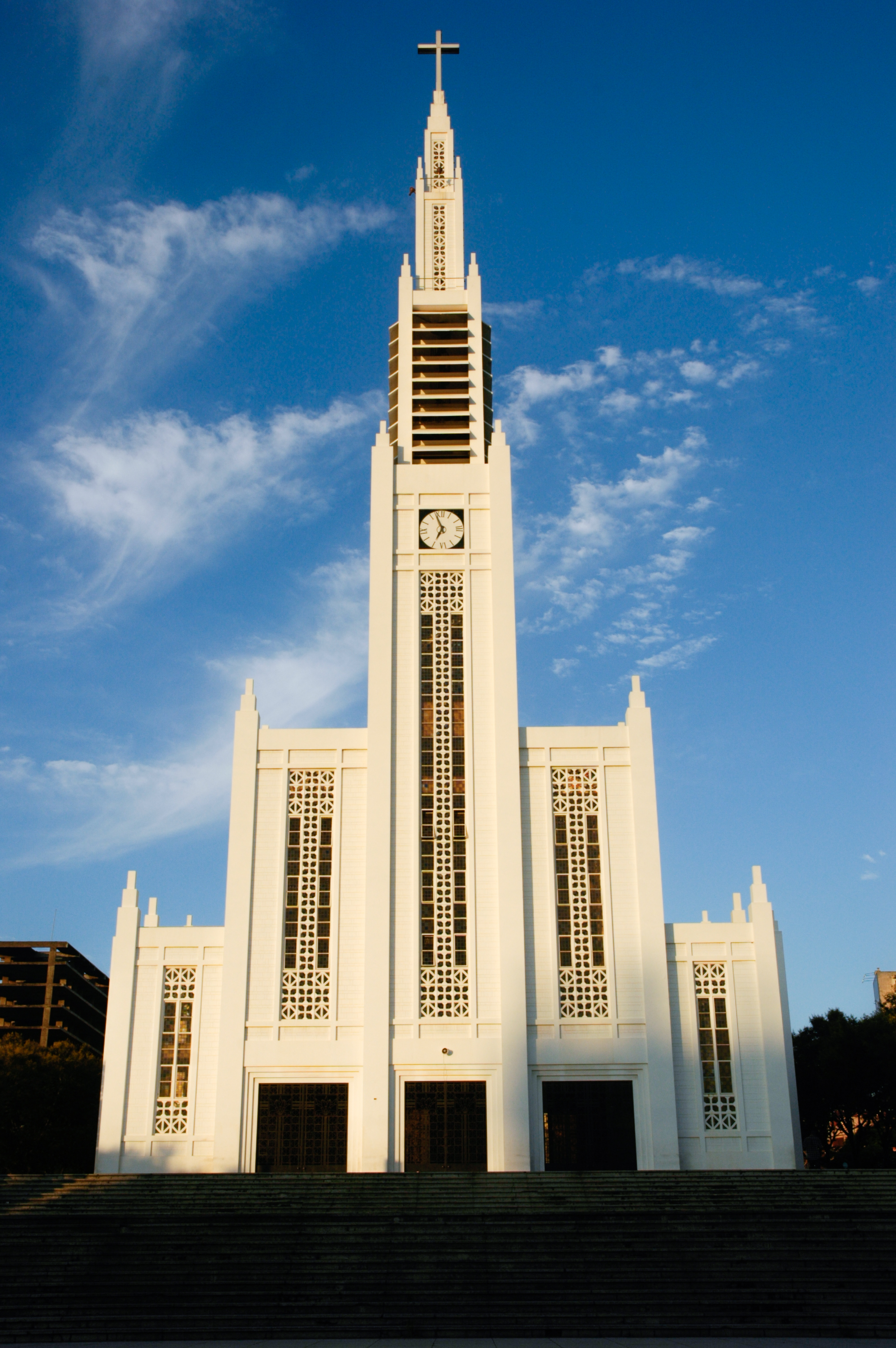
Cathedral of Maputo;
b. 1944, Mozambique

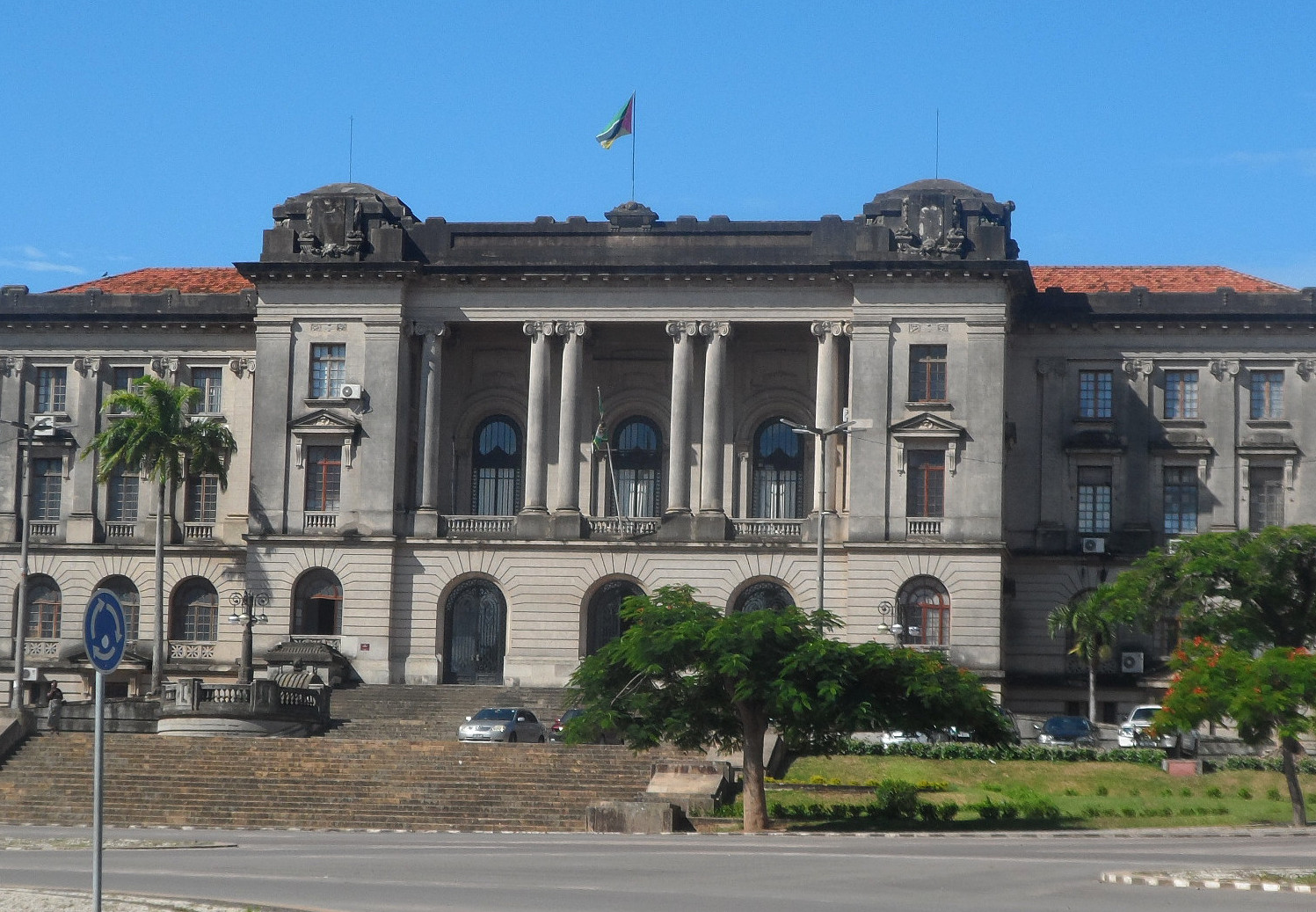
Maputo City Hall;
b. 1947, Mozambique

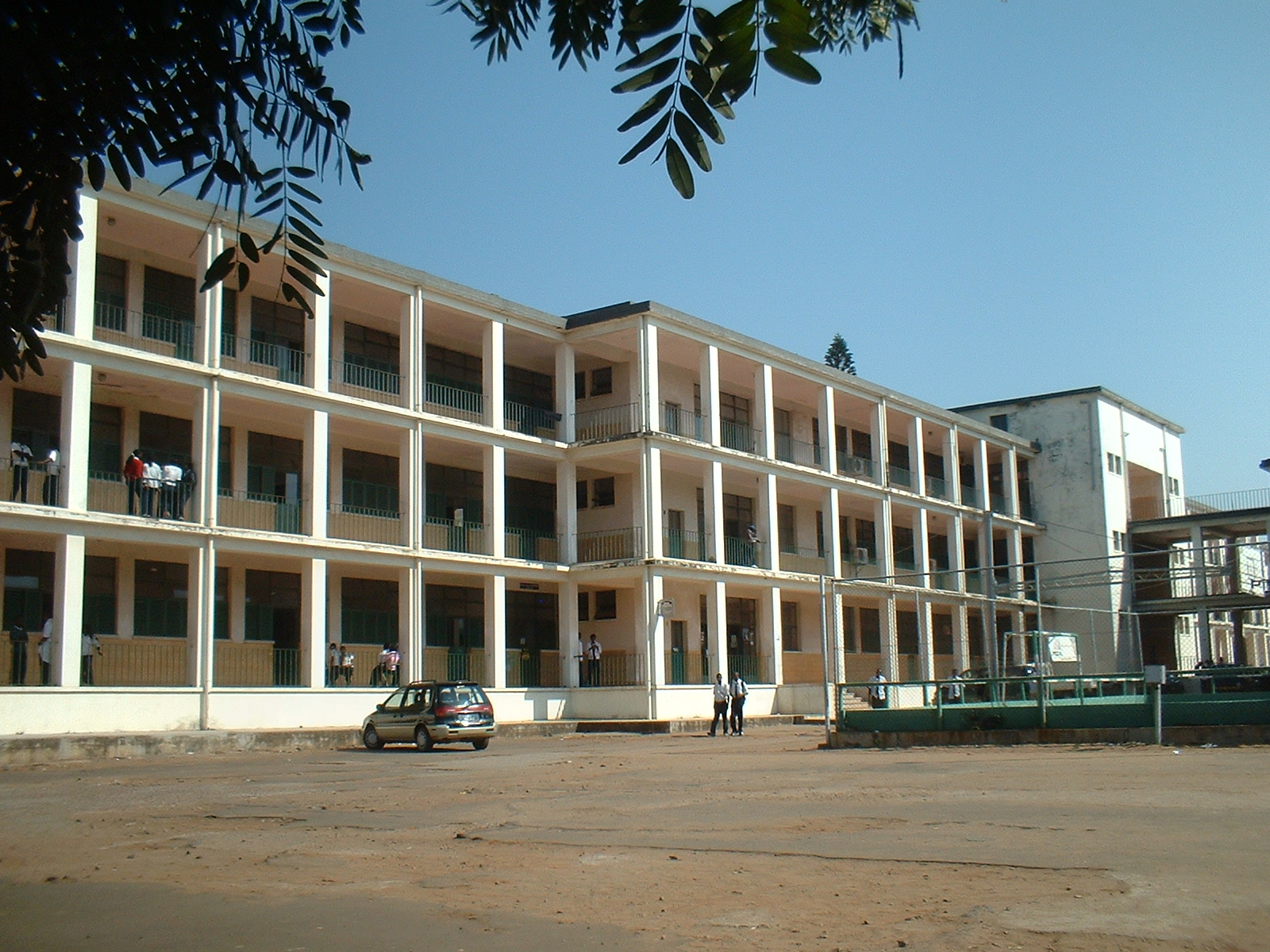
High School in Maputo;
b. 1952, Mozambique

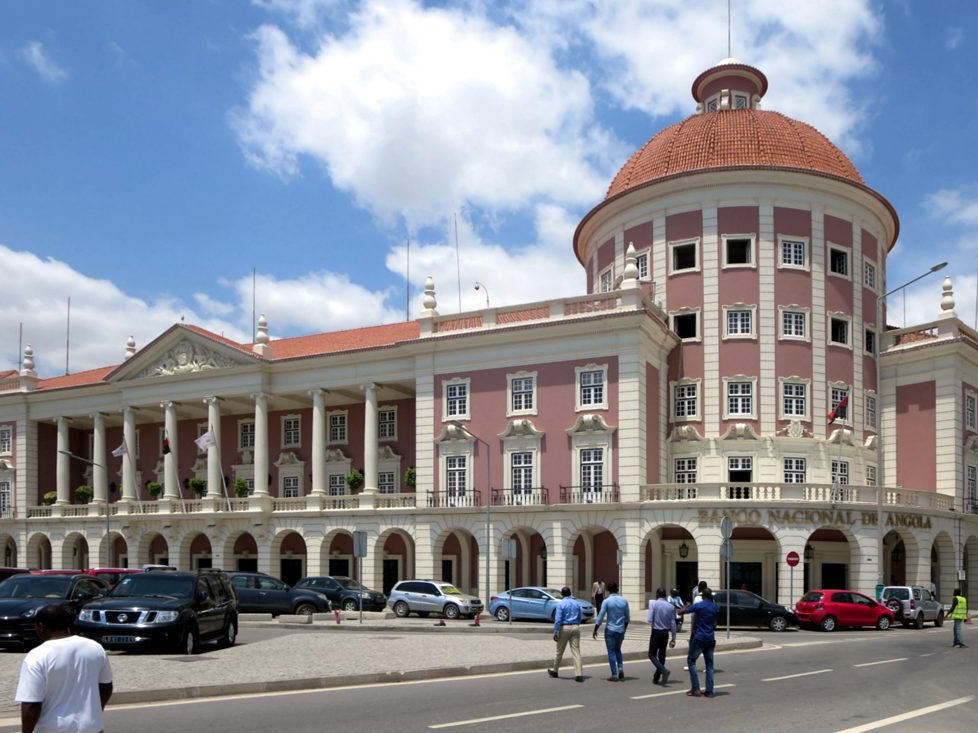
National Bank of Angola;
b. 1956, Angola

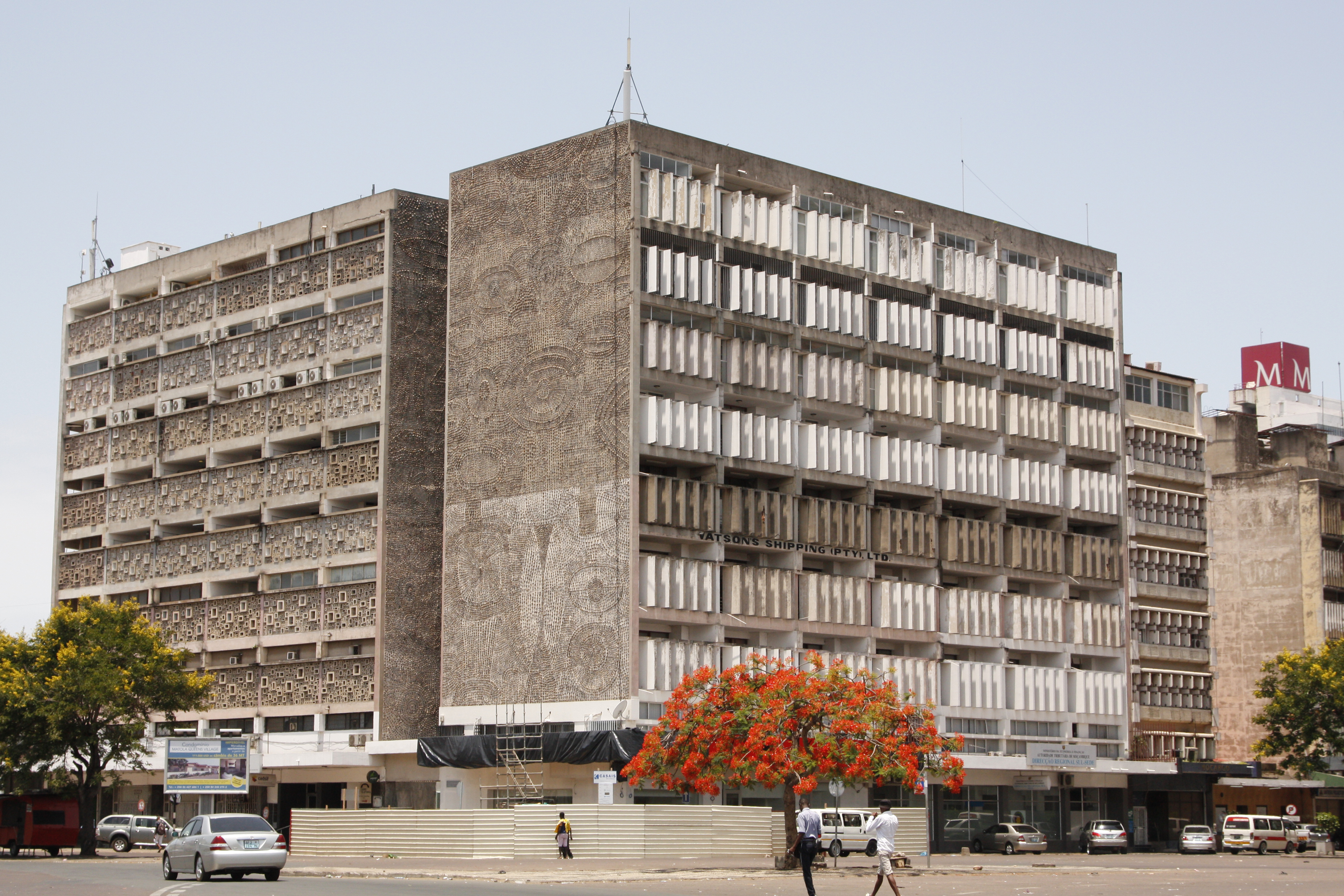
Abreu Santos e Rocha Building;
b. 1956, Mozambique

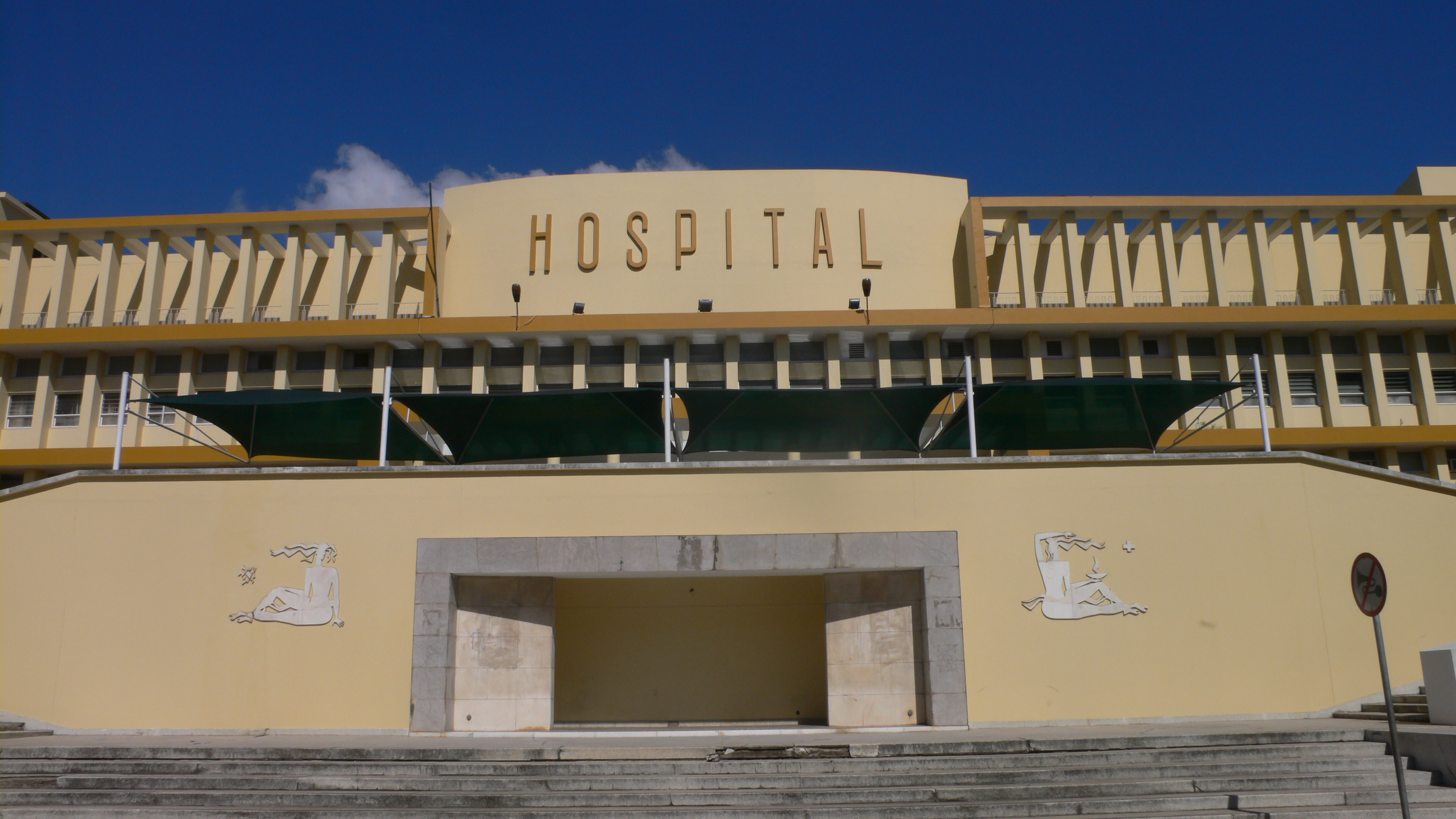
Maputo Central Hospital;
b. 1958, Mozambique

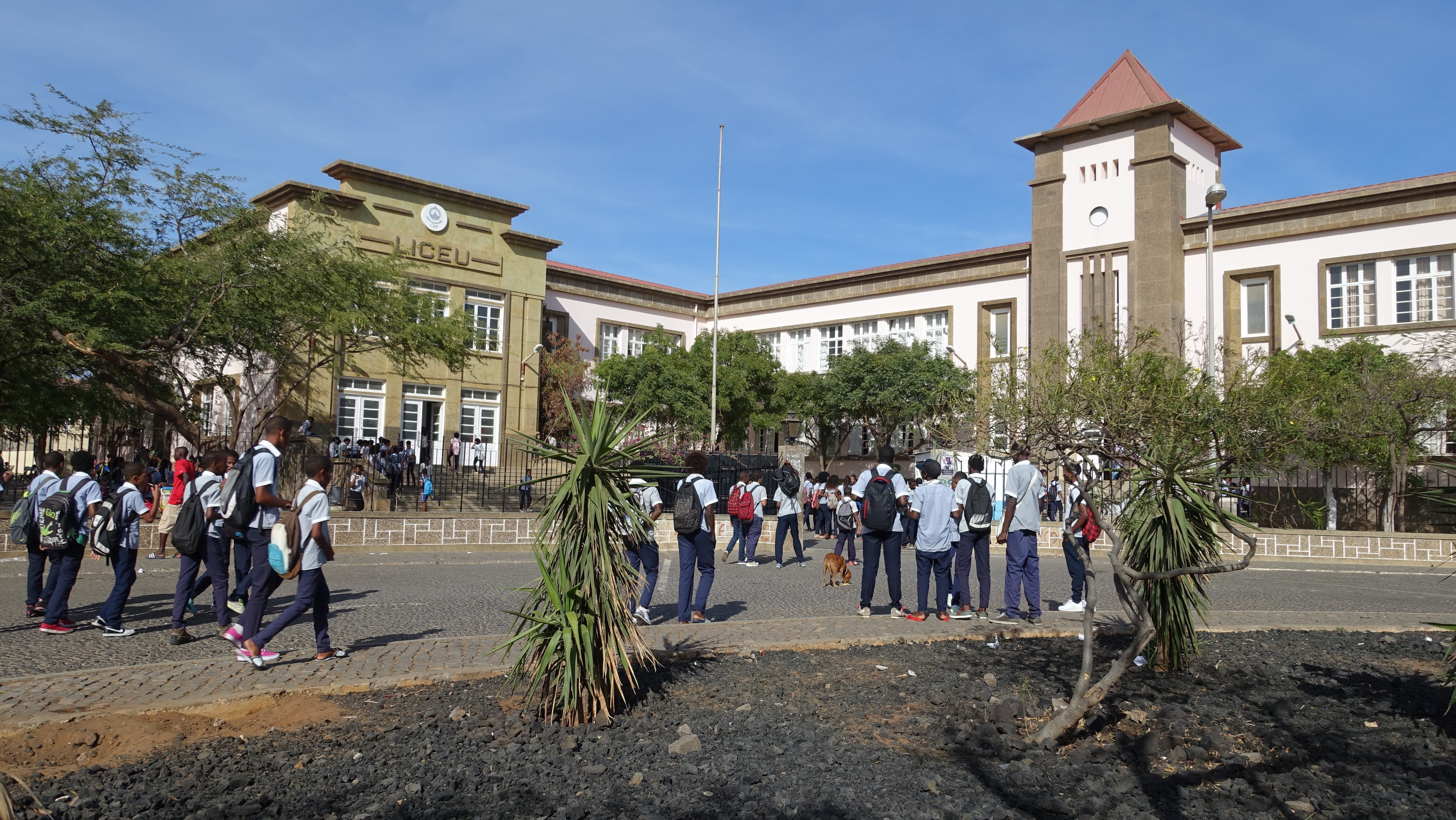
Praia High School;
b. 1960, Cape Verde

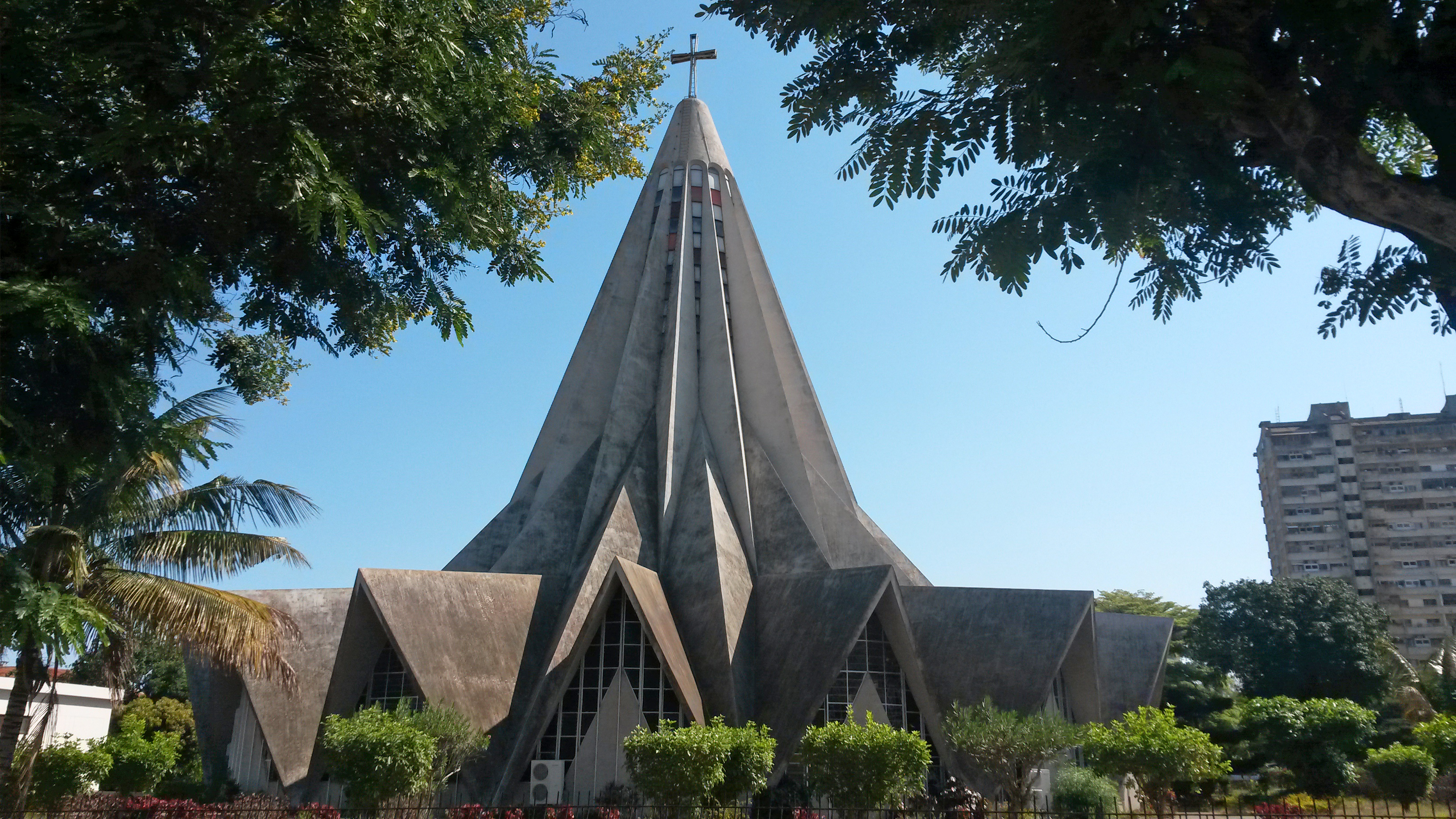
Polana Church; b. 1962, Mozambique

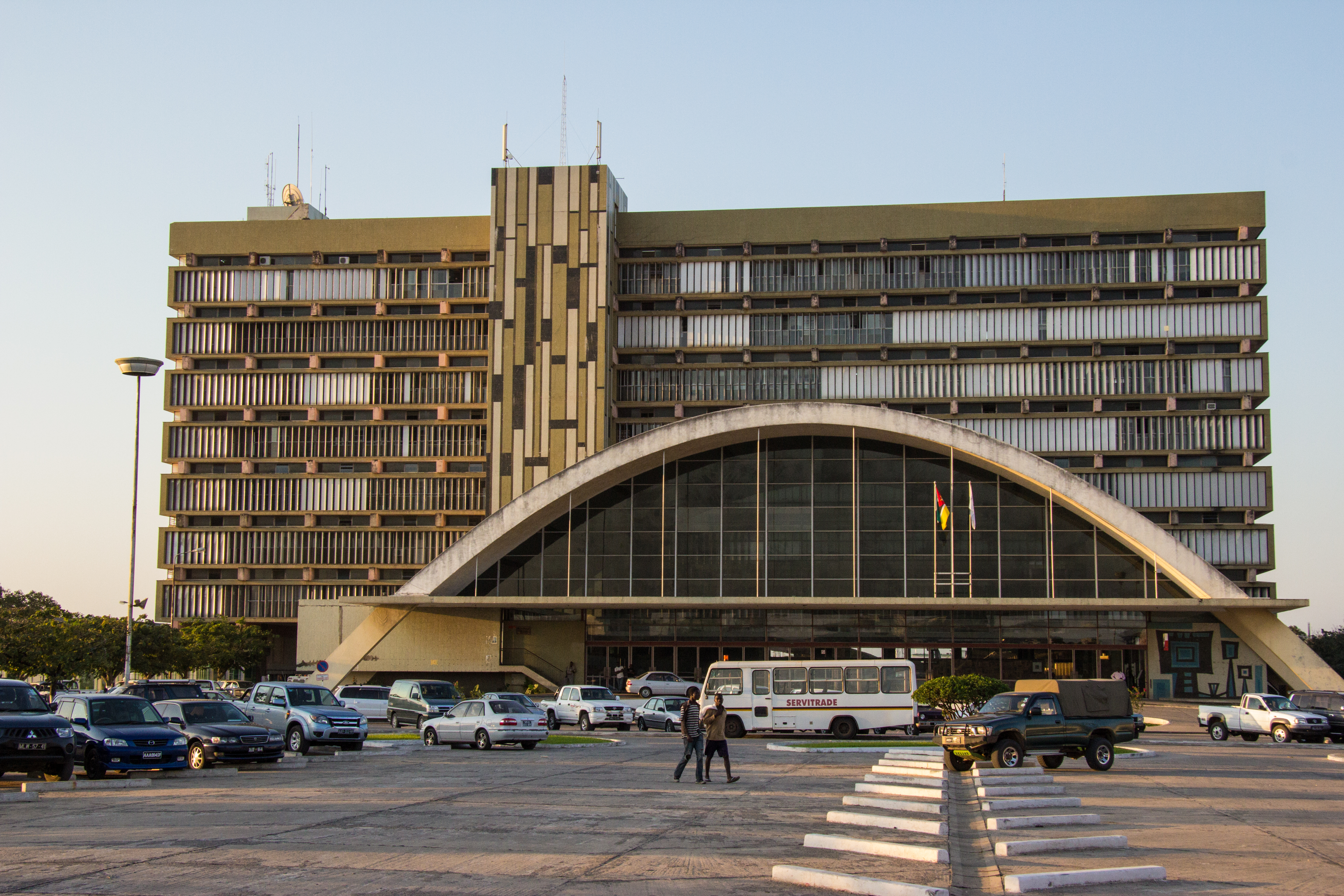
Beira Railway Station;
b. 1966, Mozambique

== See also ==
- Portuguese architecture
- Sino-Portuguese architecture
- Seven Wonders of Portuguese Origin in the World

== Sources ==
- Hue, Jorge de Souza (1999). Uma visão da arquitectura colonial no Brasil [A vision of Colonial Architecture in Brazil] (in Portuguese). Rio de Janeiro.
- Boxer, Charles Ralph (1962). The Golden Age of Brazil, 1695-1750: Growing Pains of a Colonial Society. University of California Press. ISBN 9780520015500.
