= Architecture of Cape Verde =

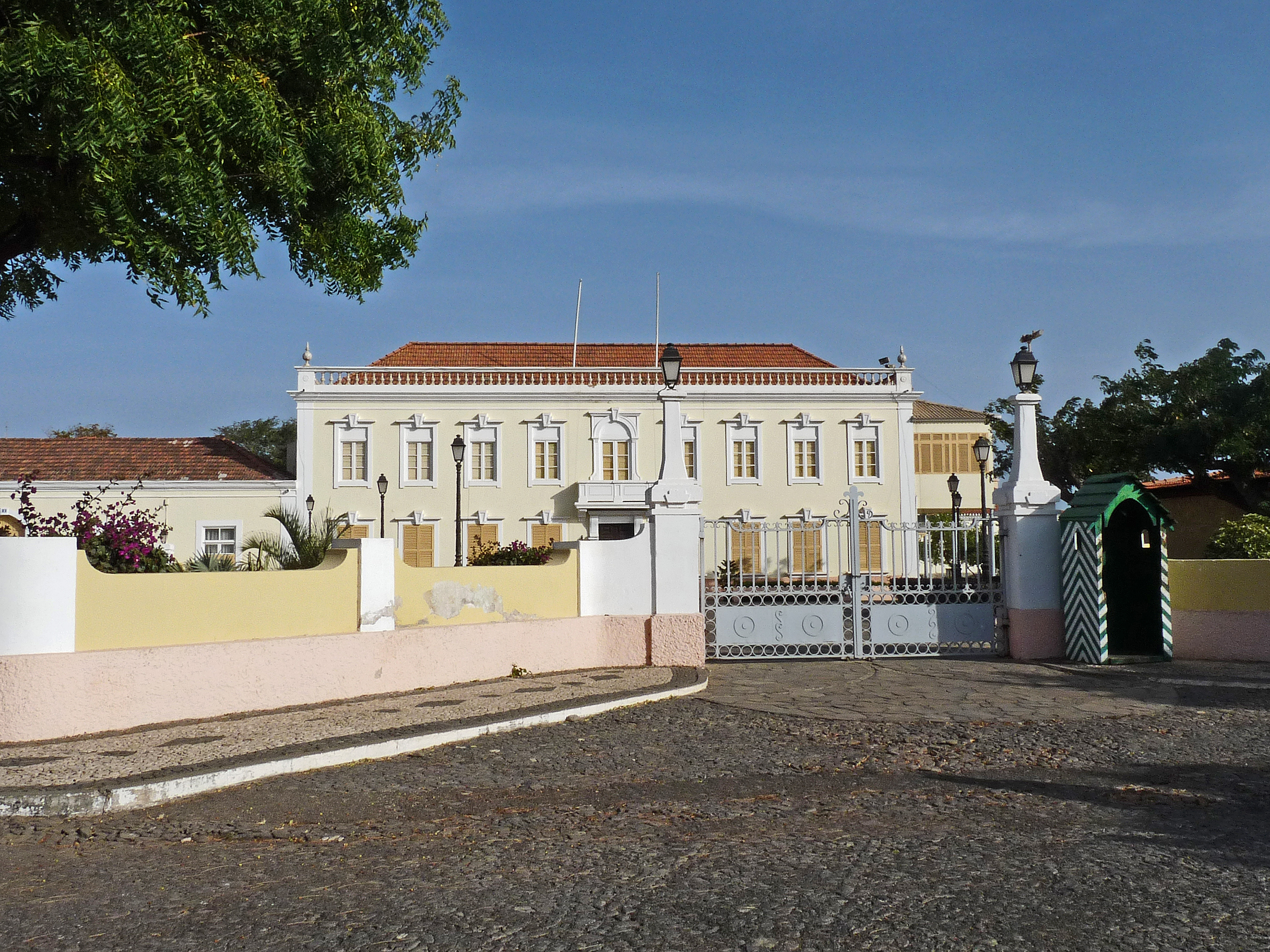
The Presidential Palace in Cape Verde

The Architecture of Cape Verde has different architectural styles. Unlike the African mainland, Cape Verde was uninhabited until 1461 when the Portuguese arrived, whereas most of the other islands were first inhabited after the end of the 15th century. Its architecture was introduced in the 1460s and has its first origins from Portuguese settlers from the Madeira Islands. The Manueline was its first architectural style, and was followed by Renaissance, Baroque, Pombaline (late-Baroque and Neoclassical), Early Modern and Modern.

== Architectural styles ==
Its main architectural styles includes funco, dominant on the islands of Fogo, Santiago and Maio, loja, used for bars and sobrado, a house style particularly founded in the city of São Filipe in Fogo. In the Colonial times, the funco style were mainly used for blacks, the loja style were once used for the mixed people and the sobrado style were for the white people used before independence.

== Colonial architecture ==
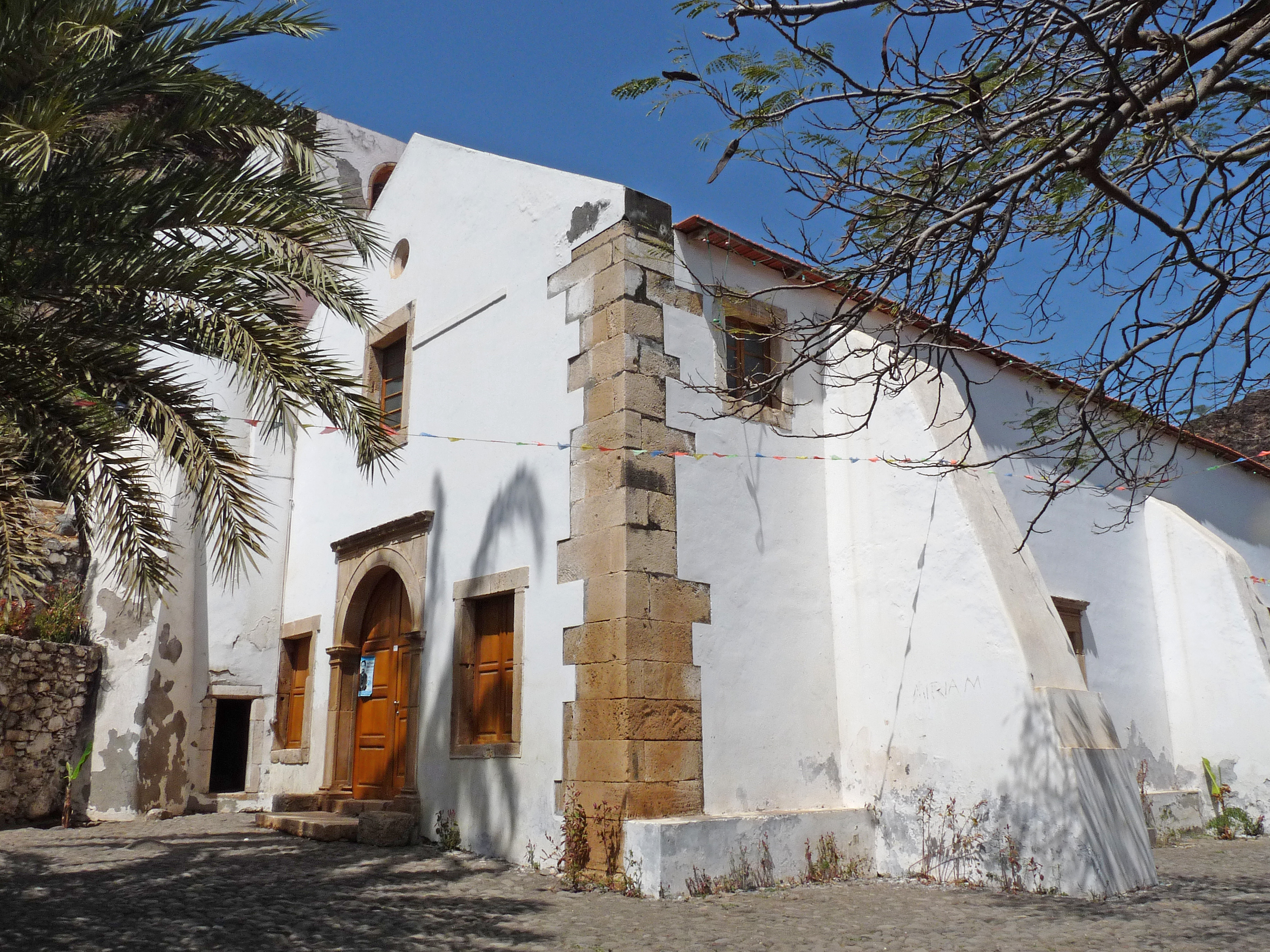
Nossa Senhora do Rosário (Our Lady of Rosary) church, the first colonial church in the world and the sub-Saharan portion of West Africa

The first 500 years would have mainly Portuguese elements in its architecture and continued until the independence of Cape Verde in 1975.

=== Manueline architecture ===
When the city of Ribeira Grande (now Cidade Velha) was enlarged in its early years in the 1450s, in the 1490s and the start of the 15th century, Manueline architecture would be featured in its buildings. Some of its styles survived in some buildings in São Filipe. The town's pillory (not a building) is one example, the other was Nossa Senhora do Rosário church, the world's first colonial church and the Sé Cathedral. After the Cassard expedition of 1712, all of its buildings were destroyed. Its ruins remain on a few. By the 20th century, there were rebuilt in different locations and these buildings are part of UNESCO's World Heritage Site since 2009.

=== Renaissance and Mannerist architecture ===
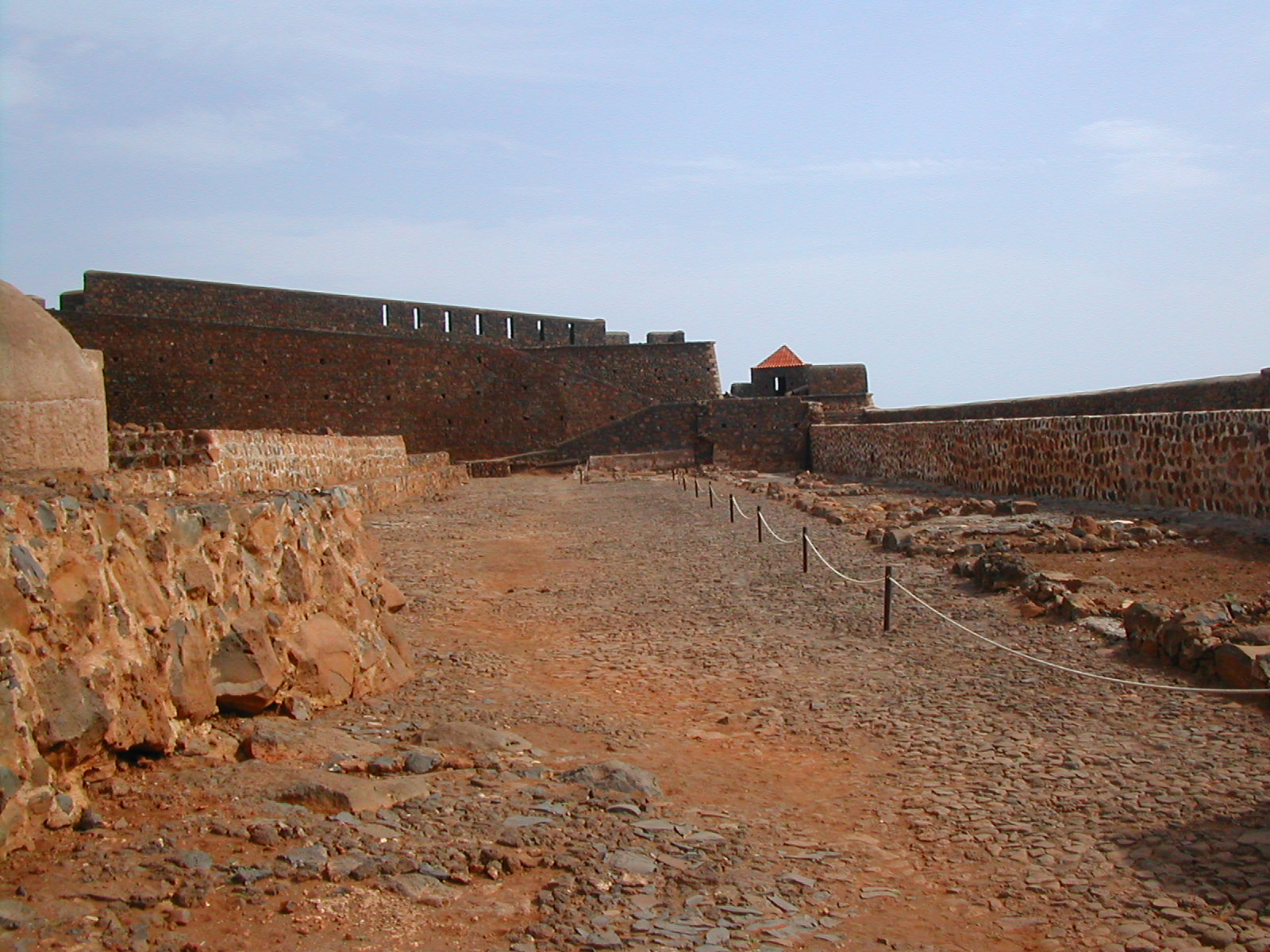
Ruins of the São Filipe fort

Most of Cidade Velha's 500 buildings until the destruction of the French featured Renaissance and Mannerist architecture, it included the churches of São Roque, São Pedro, Monte Alverne, Nossa Senhora da Conceição, the chapel of Santa Luzia, and the church and hospital of Santa Casa de Misericórdia.

Fort Real de São Filipe built on Achada de São Filipe sobre Ribeira Grande, a fort built in 1585 to protect from further attacks from corsairs after the damages during the raid by Sir Francis Drake, it was restored in 1968 and in 1999. Minimal architectural changes occurred with the Habsburg Philippine Dynasty in the Portuguese Empire which included Cape Verde for sixty years.

=== Restoration and Early Baroque architecture ===
Fortim Carlota in São Filipe, Fogo are one of the buildings, a fortress featuring Restoration era architecture. The Convent of Saint Francis (São Francisco) in Cidade Velha was built in the mid-16th century, it was destroyed by the French in 1712 during a raid and has been restored.

=== Pombaline architecture ===
==== Late Baroque architecture ====
Ribeira Grande has examples of late 18th century architecture in the center of the city.

As the colonial capital of Praia was moved in 1770, some architectural buildings were added including the warehouses and the port office, late Baroque Pombaline architecture appeared in Praia, almost all of these would be demolished by around the late 19th century and were replaced by neoclassical buildings. Only the warehouse survives today which is in Praia da Gamboa.

Other examples is São Filipe's Our Lady of Conception church ( Nossa Senhora da Conceição) which was built in a comparatively simple style at the end of the 19th century. Opposite the church there are several well-preserved colonial houses dating from the 18th century. Another one was the Pedra de Lume saltworks built in the early 20th century and its residential complexes.

==== Neoclassical architecture ====
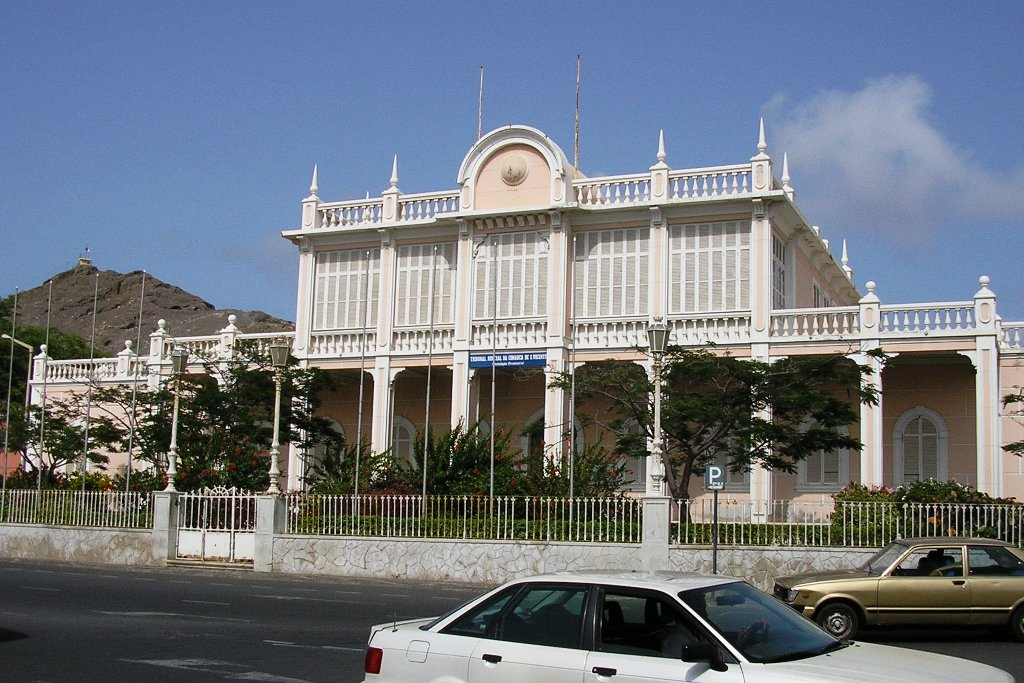
Palácio do Povo, Mindelo which serves as the center of the administration of the island, it features an Indian building style, its walls and fences are colored in pink

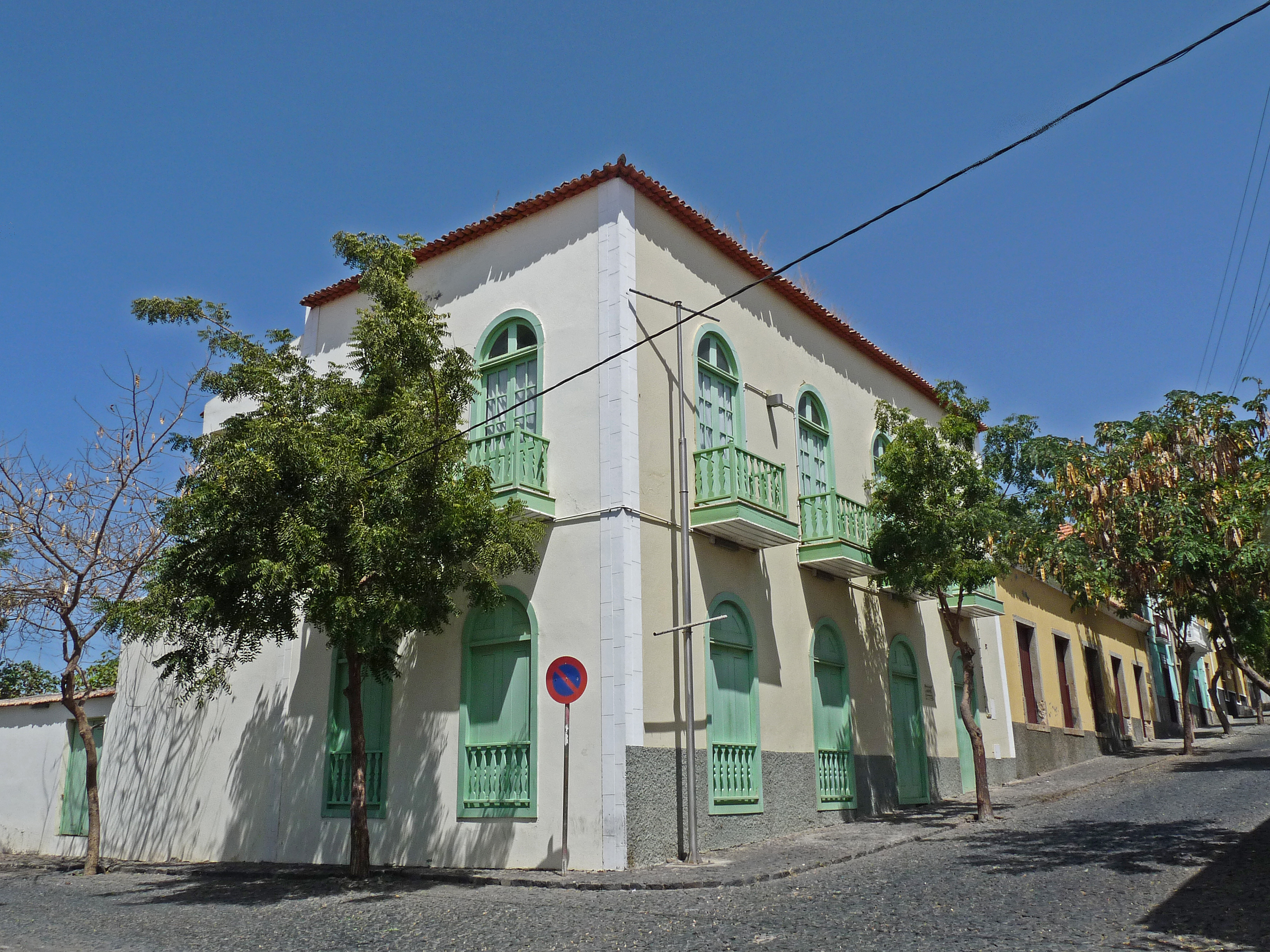
Museu Municipal de São Filipe, located in what was a sobrado style house

Neoclassical architecture dominated the building styles from 1822 up to the start of the 20th century, its most prominent were in Praia, the Platô and Mindelo. Praia underwent large modernization by the colonial governor João da Mata Chapuzet, one of the buildings he designed was Quartel Jaime Mota. Most of the buildings features roofs detached from its walls, common in Portugal and the Portuguese Empire at the time. As Mindelo flourished in the mid to late 19th centuries with its coal refueling and telegraph services, numerous Pombaline and neoclassical architecture appeared across Mindelo. notable examples include Centro Nacional de Artesanato (founded as Centro de Artesanato), Palácio do Povo which features Indian style architecture with its walls and fences in pink, today which serves as the center of the island's administration and offices, others are Fortim d'El-Rei built in 1852 and used as a defense of Porto Grande and the city, the Mindelo Cultural Center, Mindelo Library, the old barracks, a replica of Lisbon's Torre de Belém, Paço do Concelho, Liceu Gil Eanes, the former British consulate, the French Cultural Center, bandstands or kiosks of Praças Estreia and Amilcar Cabral and the Mindelo Cathedral of Our Lady of Grace.

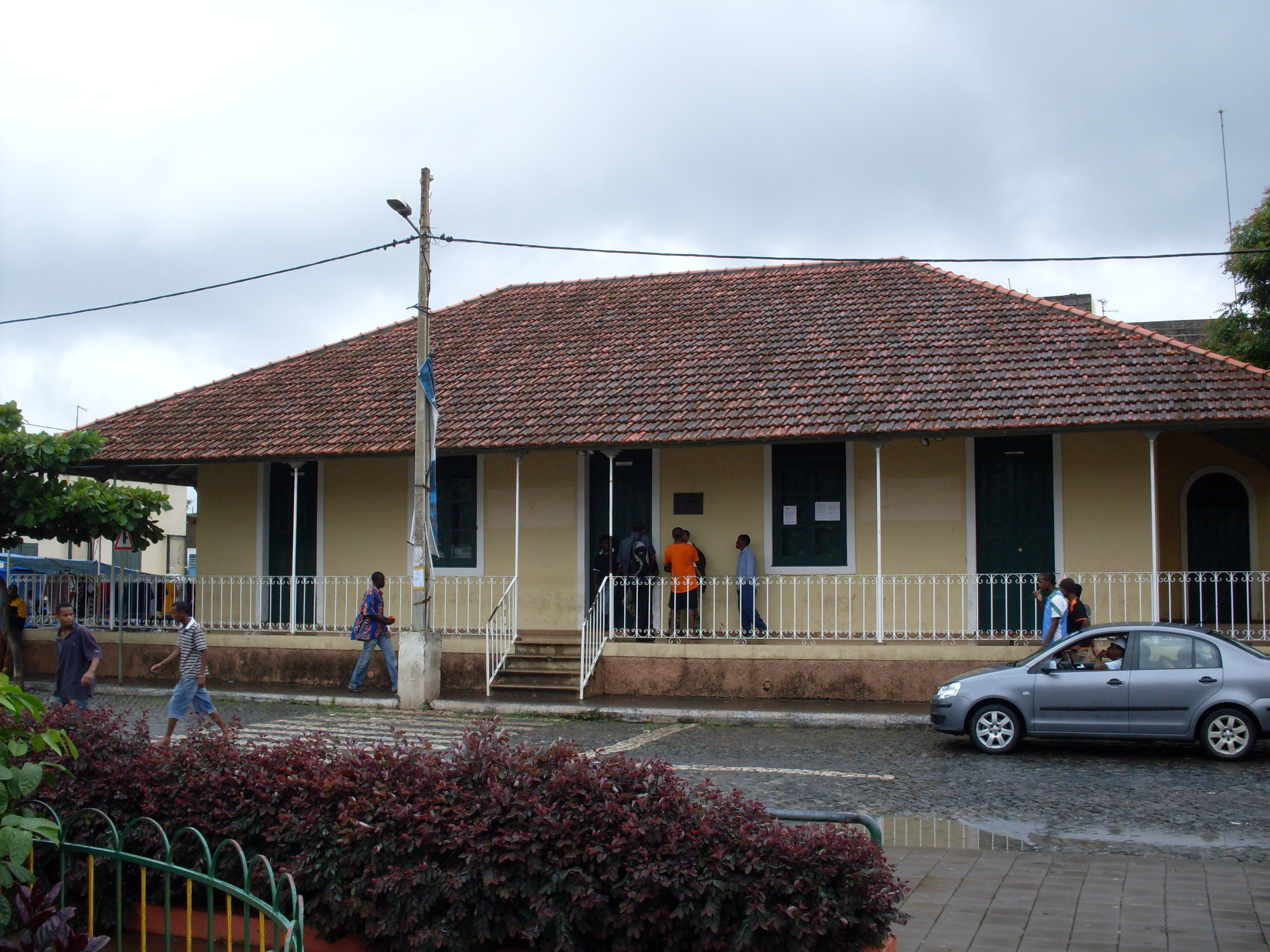
Museu da Tabanka, Assomada

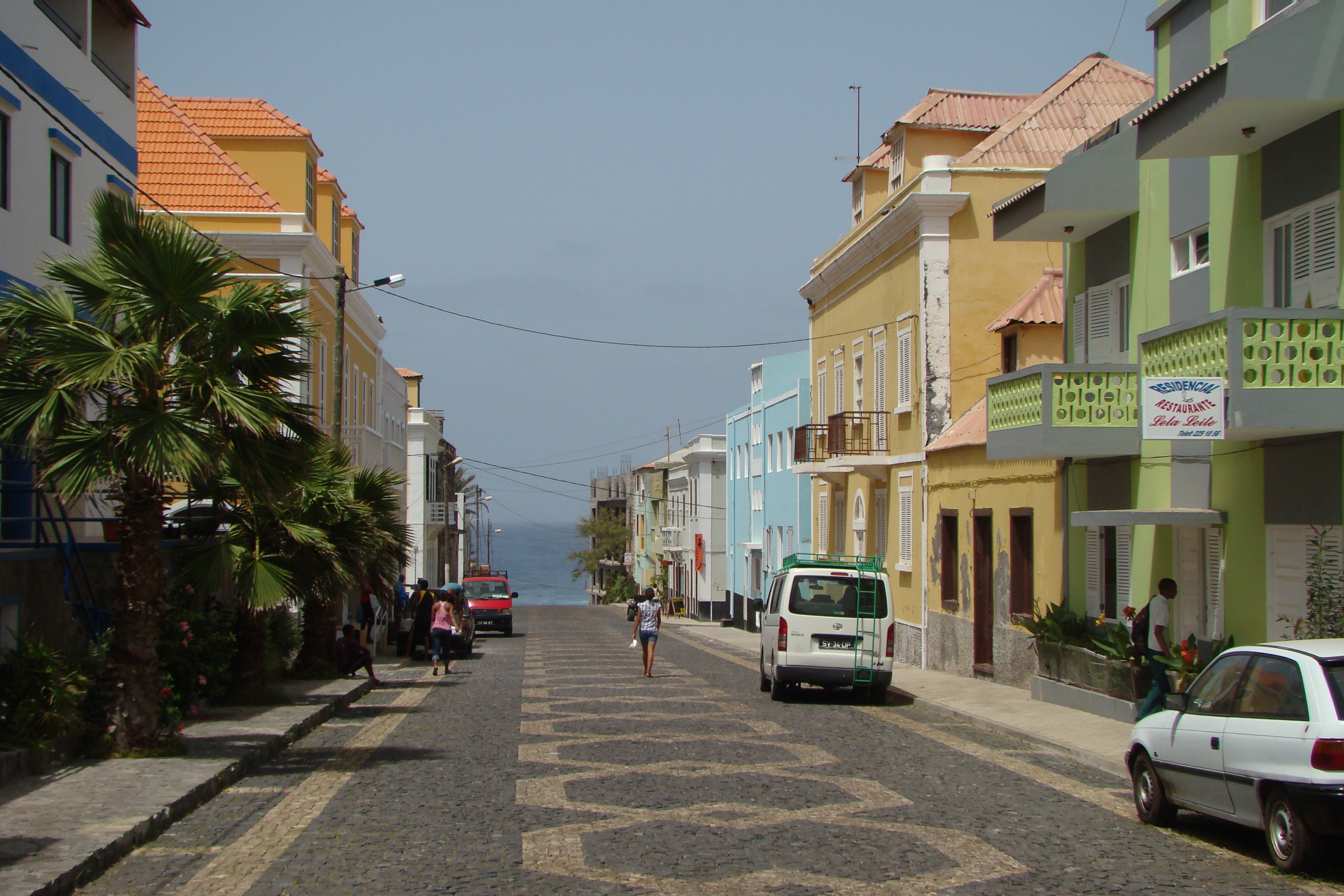
Center of Ponta do Sol with its decorated street along with buildings with colonial architecture, one of them has modern architecture today

Other notable examples include those in Praia, the Praia City Hall and the buildings around Albuquerque square (also the 12 de Setembro Square) including the kiosk, Escola Grande and its buildings around Loreno Square, Museu Etnográfico da Praia, Praia Cathedral, the former Banco Nacional Ultramarino (BNU) Praia branch which is now the headquarters of Banco Comercial do Atlântico, Hospital Agostinho Neto (first as Praia Hospital), Praia Maria and Boutique hotels, Palácio Cultural Ildo Lobo, the building where Quintal da Música is located and most of all the Presidential Palace of Cape Verde with its luxuriant garden. On Fogo in São Filipe including one that is now Casa de Memória, the town kiosk which is also used as a bandstand and the Museu Municipal de São Filipe featuring a traditional hut and the municipal halls of Paul and Ribeira Grande.

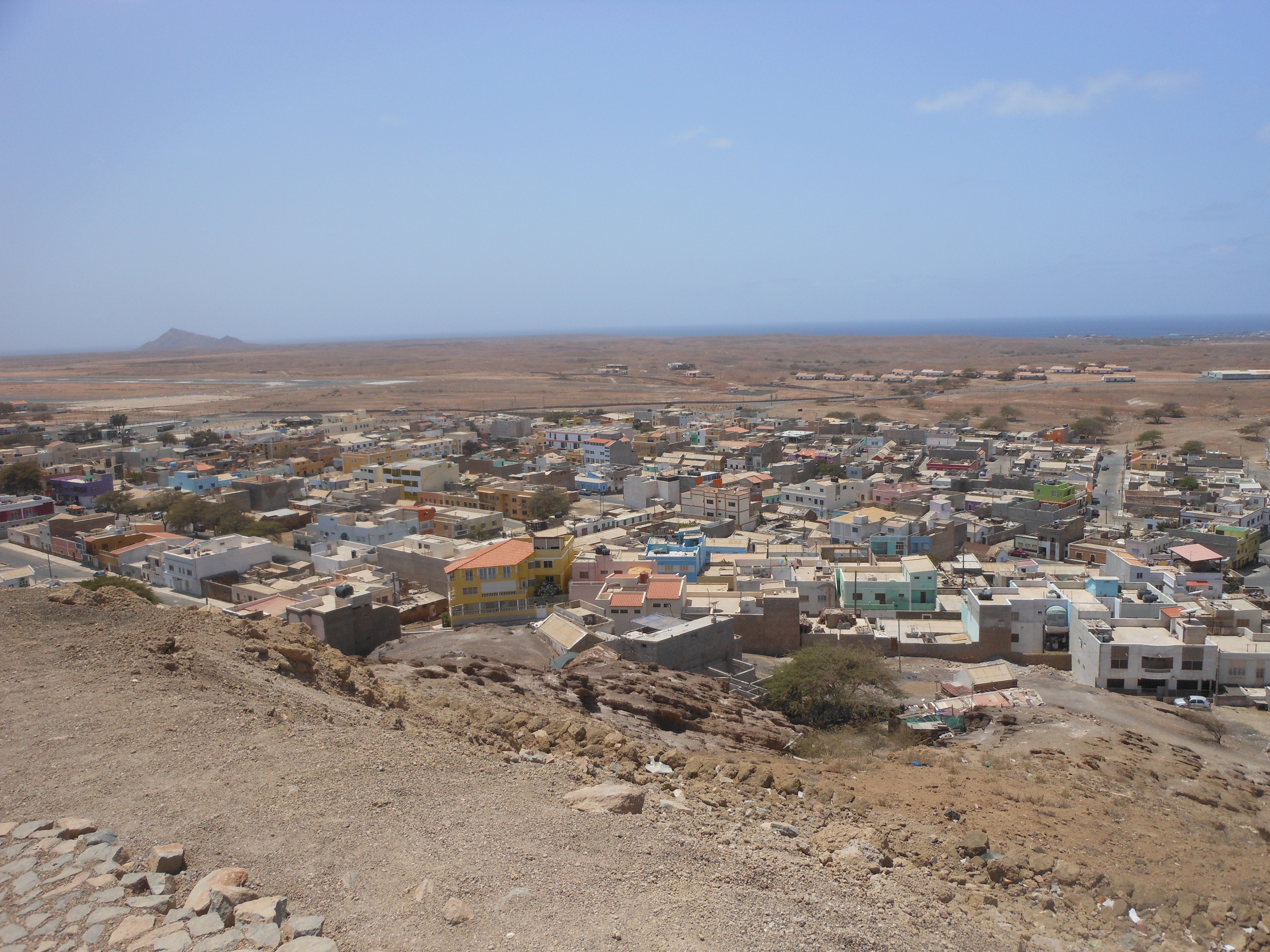
The city center of Espargos founded as Preguiça, its first buildings features early modern architecture as the town was founded in the late 1940s

Other cities featuring late Pombaline and neoclassical architecture across Cape Verde are in the centers of Paul (Pombas), Ponta do Sol, Porto Novo, built when it was called Carvoeiros, Ribeira Brava, Tarrafal de São Nicolau, a few in Santa Maria, Sal Rei, Cidade do Maio, Pedra Badejo, Assomada, Calheta de São Miguel, Tarrafal, Cova Figueira, Mosteiros, Furna, Fajã de Agua and Nova Sintra and villages including Rabil and Povoação Velha, both on Boa Vista.

Other churches built that time included Nossa Senhora da Conceição church located near Povoação Velha.

In the late 19th century, numerous lighthouses were built across Cape Verde and feature colonial architecture; notable ones includes Farol de Ponta Temerosa in Praia, Farol de Ponta Tumbo near Janela and Porto Novo, Farol de São Pedro southwest of Mindelo which has a rectangular building, Sal's Farol da Ponta Norte and Farol da Ponta do Sinó. Farol de Pedra de Lume, built in 1853 is a lighthouse that is also a chapel that has a white exterior, made out of tile and black and white horizontal bands painted on the roof and the edges, around it serves as a diurnal marking.

Later neoclassical architecture in other parts of Praia are seen in Fazenda and Gamboa including the Electra offices.

Today, some or most of the buildings in the Platô neighborhood have been demolished and replaced with newer buildings including Banco de Cabo Verde's headquarters and the colorful buildings in the middle of Avenida Andrade Corvo.

Building projects slowed at the early 20th century which was led by drought and rain shortages across Cape Verde at the time.

=== Late colonial and early modern architecture ===
Early modern architecture started to appear in newer buildings in the 1930s such as art nouveau. During the time, Raul Pires Ferreira Chaves was director of public works for Cape Verde and Guinea-Bissau, he also lived in Cape Verde for some years, he did architectural works including the terminal and facilities of the Sal International Airport (now known as Amílcar Cabral International Airport), Farol de Fiúra in the north point (Ponta Norte) of Sal, an urban plan for the square now known as 5 do Outubro in Praia.

There were hardly any building projects in Cape Verde during the Great Depression and the Famine of the 1940s and remained up until the 1950s.

A town founded for airport services, the center of Espargos once known as Preguiça features late colonial and early modern architecture, one of its buildings is the Sal Municipal Hall.

Several Mormon and Protestant churches built before independence have modern architecture.

Other buildings built during that time included Estádio da Fontinha (now Estádio Municipal Adérito Sena) in Mindelo and Liceu Domingos Ramos in the north of the plateau. Seminaro de São José, located near Ponta Temerosa, Praia was also built during that time.

== Modern architecture ==
After independence, as the population grew, modern architecture spread and many buildings today have a flat roof as do other modern buildings on the African mainland. One of these were a building that is now part of the University of Cape Verde, its main campus in Palmarejo and other buildings in the new section of Palmarejo.

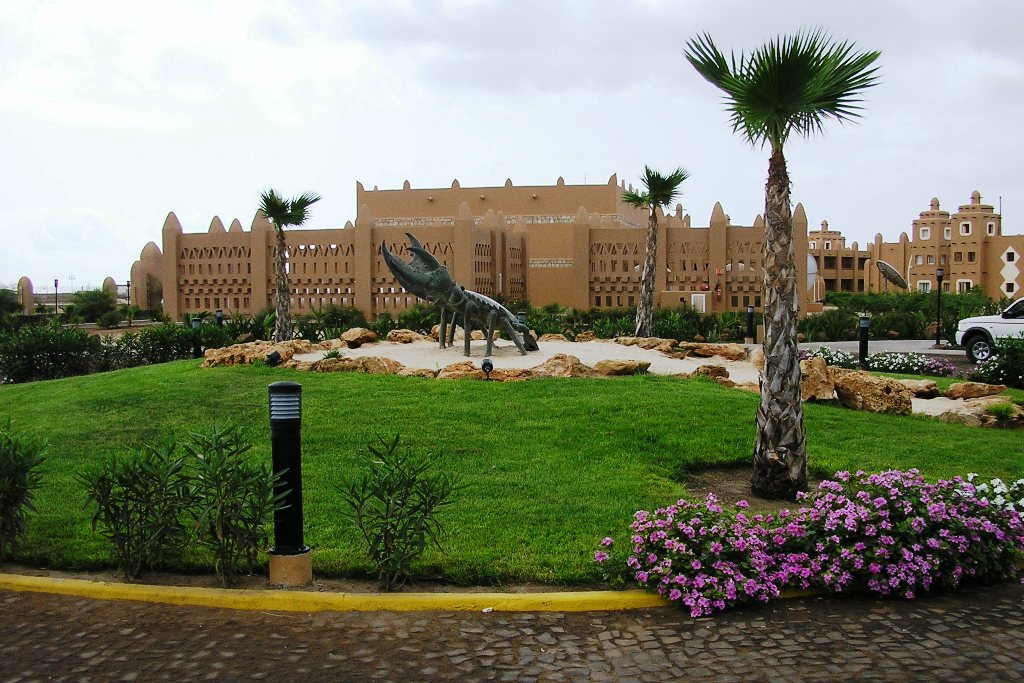
Funaná Hotel, an example of modern architecture which features African, Spanish, probably Mexican and Moorish elements

Other areas with buildings that contain only modern architecture includes the towers of Gamboa/Chã das Areias in the center of Praia and nearby. Another is an information pavilion near Barragem de Poilão in the middle of the island of Santiago. Escola Jorge Barbosa and Hotel Porto Grande, both are in Mindelo also features modern architecture. Constructed in the late 1990s, one of the most notable is the National Library located in Várzea in the center of Praia. The other is the headquarters of the Bank of Cape Verde in the Plateau, being one of the first glass buildings.

After the end of the 20th century, modern architecture are featured in several sports stadiums including the Estádio Marcelo Leitão in Espargos built in 2003, Estádio Municipal Arsénio Ramos in Sal Rei built in 2008 and Estádio Municipal do Porto Novo in 2009. Also in some resorts and vilas, Afro-Moorish architecture appears in Santa Maria (Funana, Garupa) and near Sal Rei (Karamboa, also features Arabesque architecture) along with a mixture of modern Afro-Northern Mediterranean architecture in places like Ribeira do Rabil southeast of Sal Rei and Murdeira, Sal. One of the recent international airports constructed was the Aristides Pereira International Airport, the airport of Boa Vista Island located in Rabil. Its style is a mixture of Portuguese origin and Moorish architectural elements and has peach-rose stone bricks with two arches, entrance and exit doors and a yellow exterior where the airport name is and in the south are three melon colored exteriors with two fudge-brown exteriors in between and are bordered with a stone-brick outer wall.

=== In parts of the island of Fogo ===
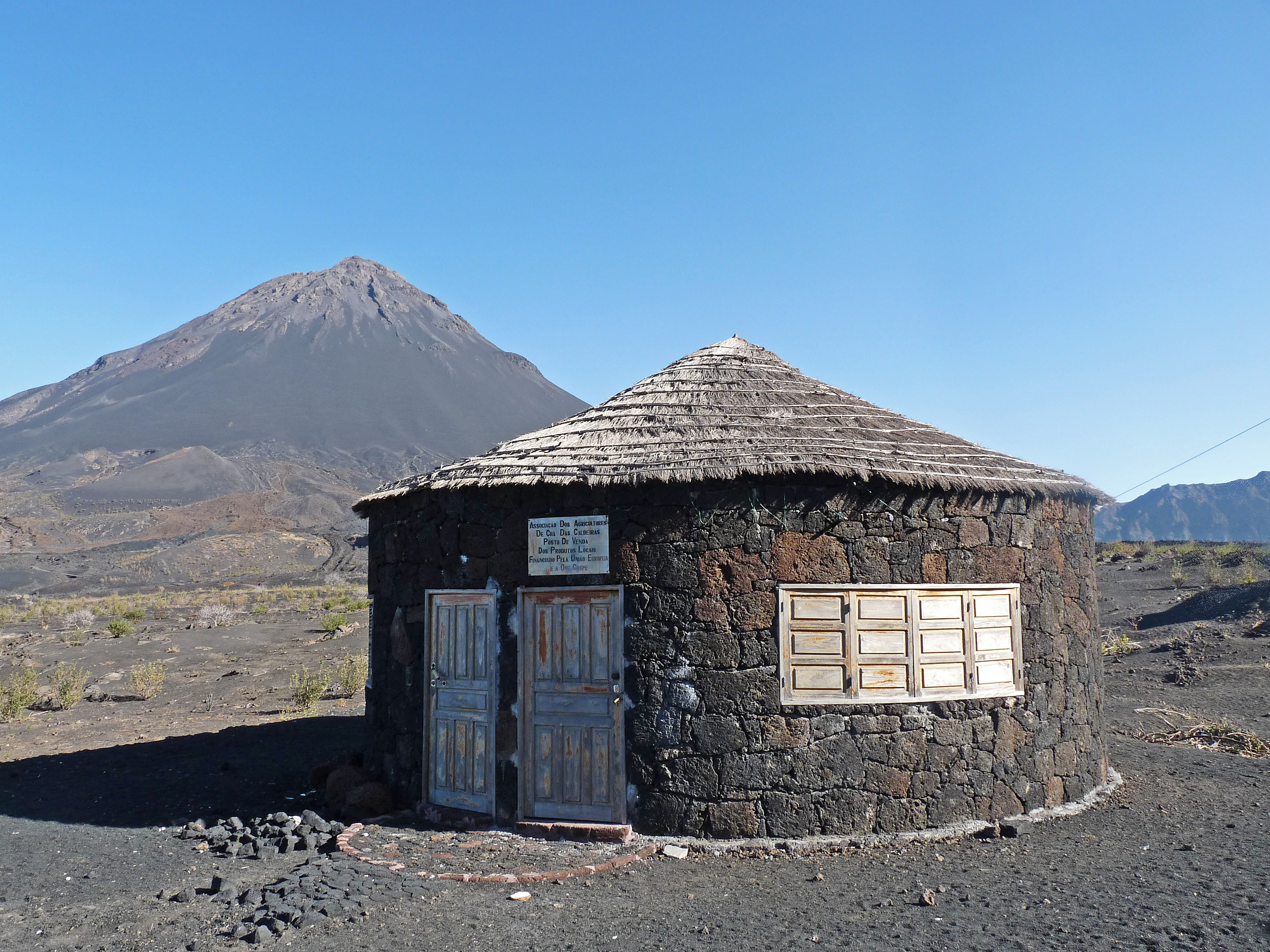
One notable example was a hut (known as funco) in Chã das Caldeiras featuring traditional architecture, its bricks were made out of lava

One of the unique architecture on Fogo was Chã das Caldeiras which has building material made out of lava, most of the buildings were built after independence especially the southwest part which were rebuilt after the 1995 eruption. Its architecture is not only of Portuguese origin but contain elements of mainland African styles such as old traditional huts and a circular plan as those in mainland African villages and towns and had only one story. It had straw roofs, bricks mainly black made out of lava, straw windowpanes and doors In other parts of Cape Verde, only a very few village have hut style buildings. Huts covered a quarter of the village. One of the most notable were a house with blue exterior walls with white facades, brown windowpane and door and on the bottom triangular bricks, painted houses did not dominate the majority of the village, another was a hut that housed the vineyard offices, The other was the Catholic church of Portela which had a circular roof, two rims and green doors. Some of the houses were rectangular with windows and some narrow doors and detached roofs, some buildings also had a flat roof. One other examples were the village's primary school which had stucco walls, white roofs and mostly white doors and some brown, nearby had a playground with its benches built out of lava, the other was Vinho do Fogo, where wine is manufactured, a small bungalow was in the middle with two small flat windows on each side, black-grey bricks made out of lava, wide doors and on the right is a part of the building, the others are outside but sheltered and a near rectangular café with sky blue exterior walls, windows and three narrow doors.

Almost the whole of the village were destroyed by lava flows of the 2014-15 eruption between November and February, several survive with minimal or moderate damages, a few were unharmed.

In early 2016, newer buildings and huts were built and out of lava and some new inhabitants moved in.

The rare architectural style's project was awarded the National Architecture Award in 2013, as Best Project of the Year and was awarded the Archdaily Building of the Year International Award in 2015.

Elsewhere on Fogo, some of the buildings built out of lava have good architecture and some of these are in the east of São Filipe.

== In the media ==
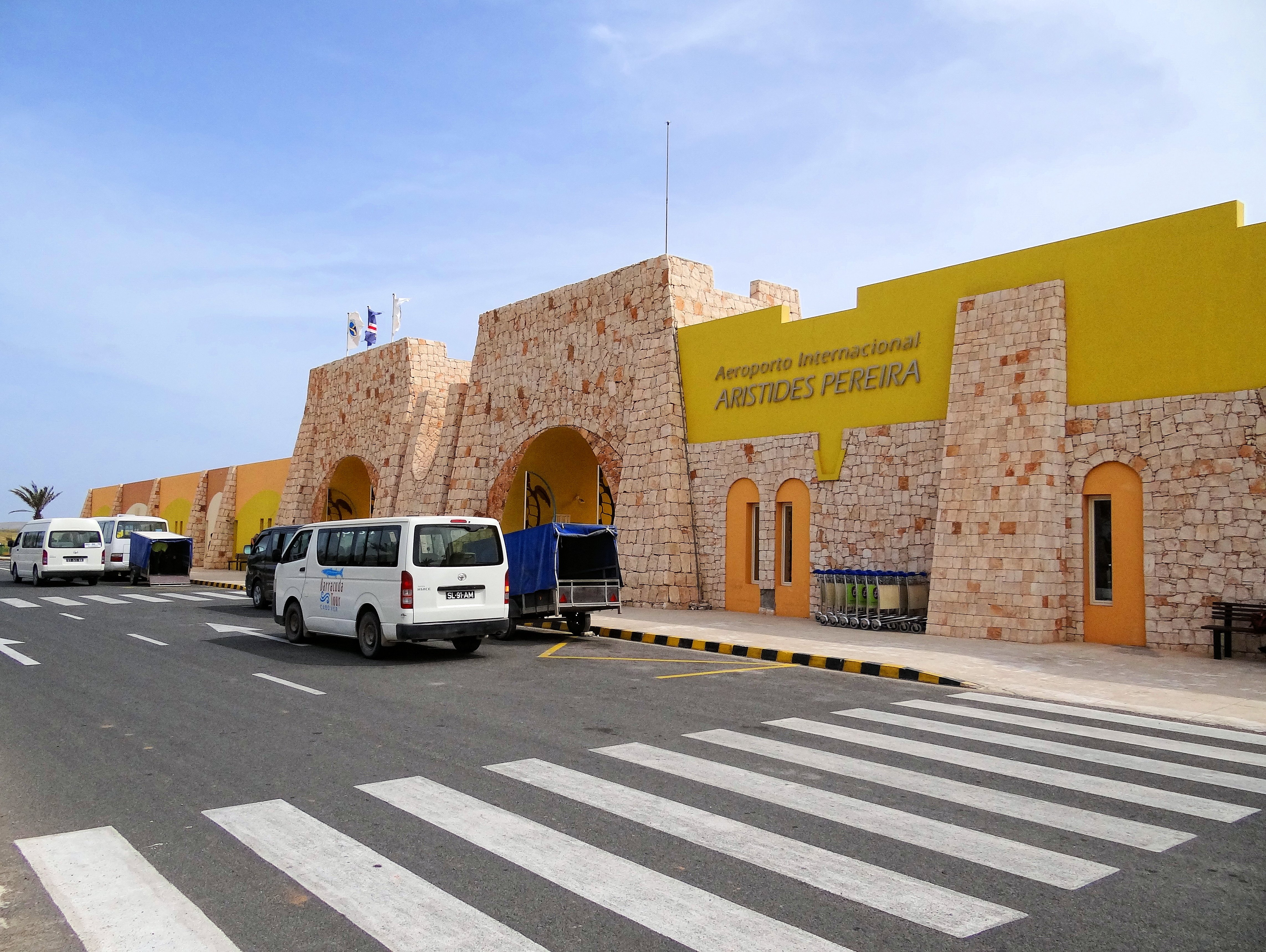
Terminal building of Aristides Pereira International Airport in Rabil, Boa Vista. The building style is a mixture of Portuguese and Moorish and has stone bricks

A documentary film titled Architecture of Cidade Velha (Arquitectura de Cidade Velha) was released in 2007 and was directed by Catarina Alves Costa. The film was about all the historic buildings in Cidade Velha including the Nossa Senhora do Rosário church, the pillory and its fort.
