= List of buildings and structures in Cape Verde =

This article is a list of buildings and structures in Cape Verde ordered by city or island:

== Boa Vista ==
- Nossa Senhora da Conceição church in Povoação Velha
- Aristides Pereira International Airport near Rabil
- Forte Duque de Bragança on Ilhéu de Sal Rei
- Estádio Municipal Arsénio Ramos in Sal Rei

== Brava ==
- Esperadinha Airport (closed)
- Estádio Aquiles de Oliveira in Nova Sintra
- Ilhéu de Cima Lighthouse

== Fogo ==
- Estádio Municipal Francisco José Rodrigues in Mosteiros
- Estádio Monte Pelado in Cova Figueira
- Estádio 5 de Julho in São Filipe
- Museu Municipal de São Filipe in São Filipe
- São Filipe Airport near São Filipe

== Maio ==
- Estádio Municipal 20 de Janeiro - Cidade do Maio - multiuse stadium

== Sal ==
- Amílcar Cabral International Airport, Espargos
- Estádio Marcelo Leitão, Espargos
- Farol da Ponta do Sinó, Santa Maria
- Farol de Ponta de Vera Cruz, Santa Maria
- Farol de Pedra de Lume, Pedra de Lume
- Farol da Ponta Norte

== Santo Antão ==
- Estádio Municipal do Porto Novo, Porto Novo
- Agostinho Neto Airport, Ponta do Sol
- Estádio João Serra, Ribeira Grande
- Farol da Ponta de Tumbo, Janela

== São Nicolau ==
- Estádio João de Deus Lopes da Silva - Ribeira Brava
- Forte do Príncipe Real in Preguiça

== See also ==
- List of airports in Cape Verde
- List of churches in Cape Verde
- List of football stadiums in Cape Verde
- List of lighthouses in Cape Verde
- List of museums in Cape Verde
- List of universities in Cape Verde

Related articles:

- Architecture of Cape Verde
