= Ponta Norte =

- Headland
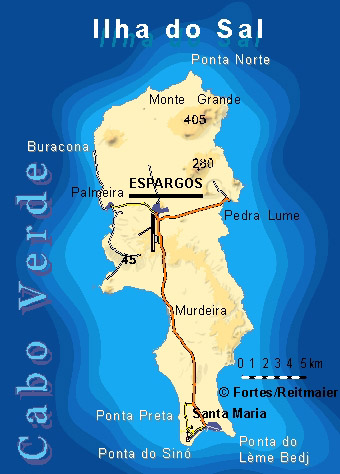

- Location within Cape Verde
- Coordinates: 16°51′22″N 22°55′12″W
- Location: Northern Sal, Cape Verde
- Water bodies: Atlantic Ocean

Ponta Norte (Portuguese for "north point") is a headland on the north coast of the island of Sal in Cape Verde. It is the northernmost point of Sal. It is approximately 11 km north of the island capital of Espargos. The lighthouse Farol da Ponta Norte is located near the cape.
