= Museu Etnográfico da Praia =

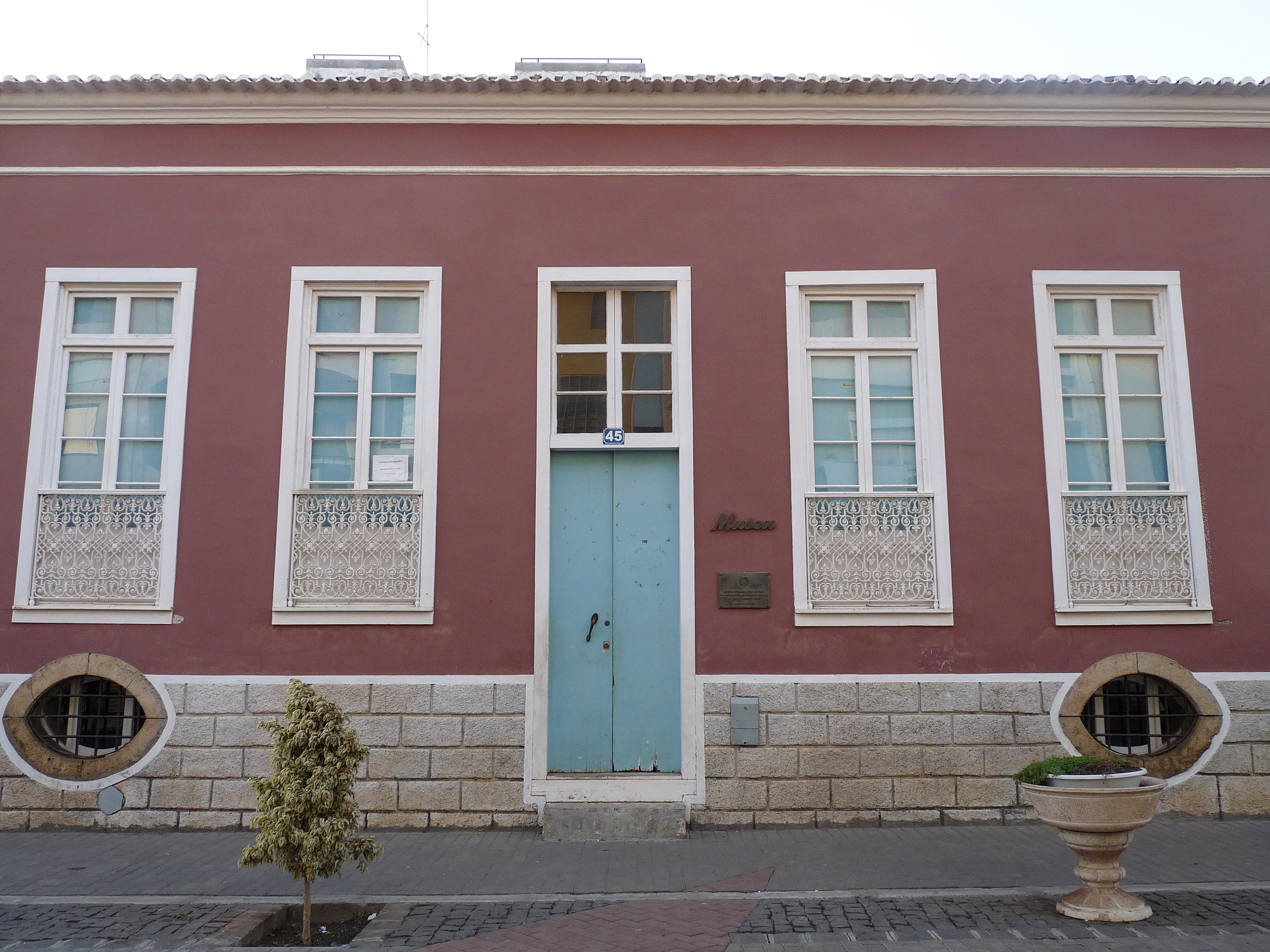
- Front of the museum
- Established: 1997
- Location: Rua 5 de Julho 45, Praia, Santiago, Cape Verde
- Coordinates: 14.9209°N 23.5072°W
- Type: Ethnographic Museum
- Website: Official website

Museu Etnográfico da Praia is an ethnographic museum in the Cape Verdean capital of Praia on the island of Santiago. It is located at 45 Rua 5 de Julho, in the historic part of the city, the Plateau. The museum was opened in November 1997 and is located in a 19th-century building. The museum contains a selection of objects that represent the traditional uses and customs of the Cape Verdean people.

== See also ==
- List of museums in Cape Verde
- Culture of Cape Verde
- Museu Municipal de São Filipe
- List of buildings and structures in Santiago, Cape Verde
