= Rua 5 de Julho =

Street in Praia, Cape Verde

Coordinates: 14.919°N 23.5083°W

- Rua Pedonal
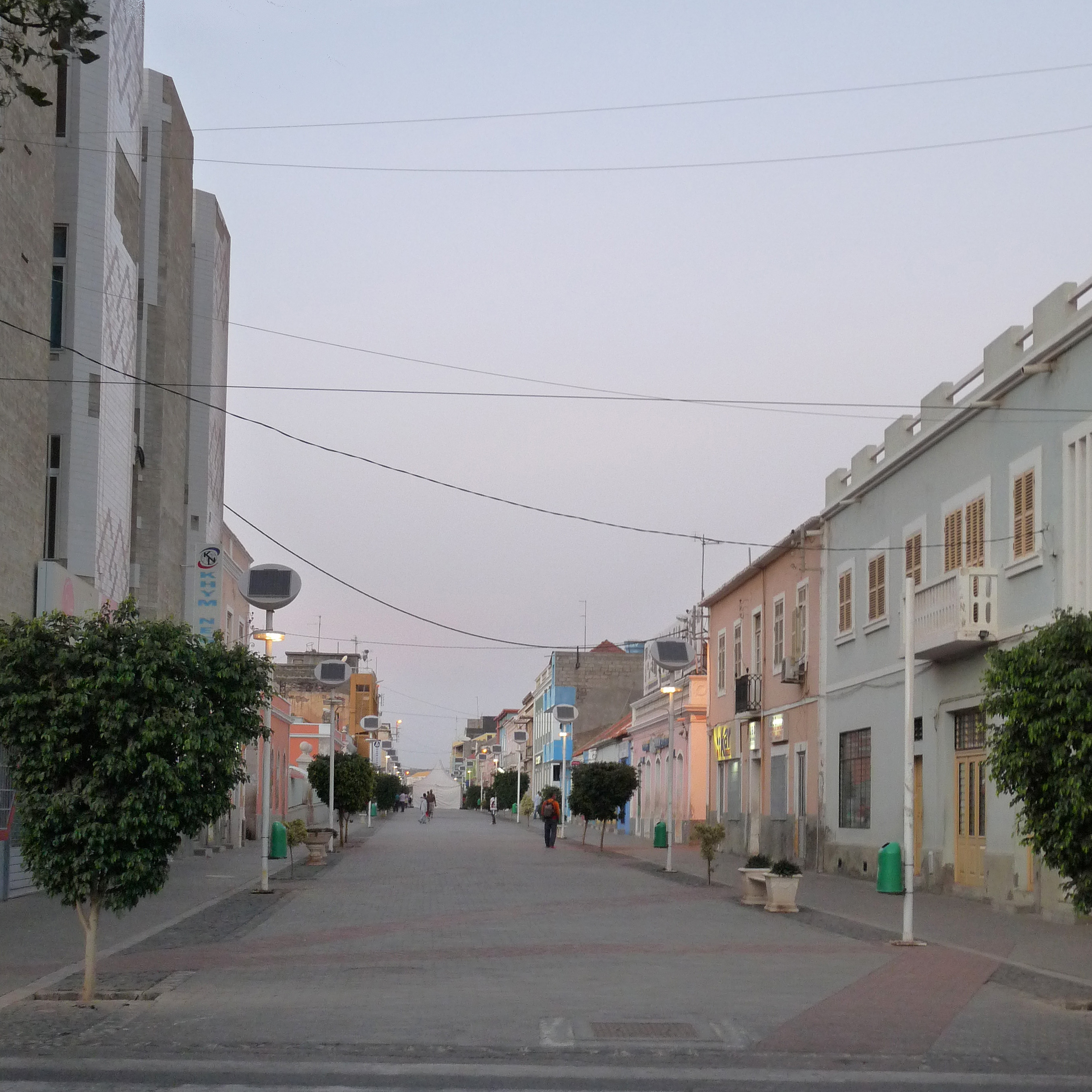
- Rua 5 de Julho from Praça Alexandre Albuquerque
- Interactive map of Rua 5 de Julho
- Former name: Rua D. Luís
- Namesake: Date of Cape Verdean independence
- Location: Praia, Cape Verde
- North end: Avenida Amílcar Cabral
- South end: Praça Alexandre Albuquerque

Rua 5 de Julho (also: Rua Pedonal "pedestrian street", formerly Rua D. Luís) is a street in the Plateau, the historic centre of Praia, Santiago island, Cape Verde. Formerly named Rua D. Luís after King Luís I of Portugal, it was renamed after 5 July, the independence day of Cape Verde (1975). It runs south to north, parallel to Avenida Amílcar Cabral and Rua Serpa Pinto. Praça Alexandre Albuquerque is at its southern end. It has been pedestrianised in the early 21st century.

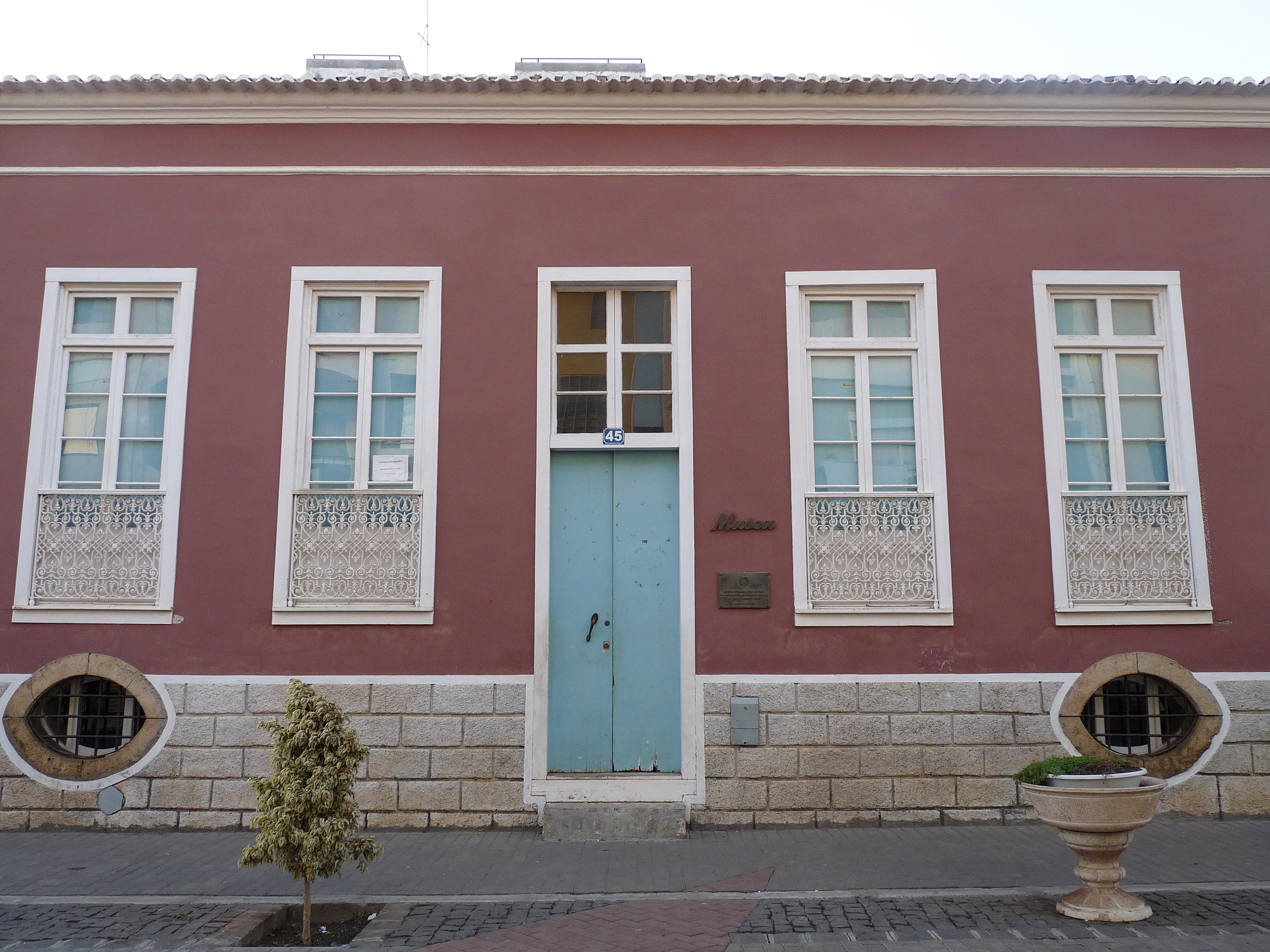
Museu Etnográfico da Praia

Notable buildings along the street:

- the Municipal Market
- Museu Etnográfico da Praia
