= Ponta do Norte Lighthouse =

Ponta Norte Lighthouse
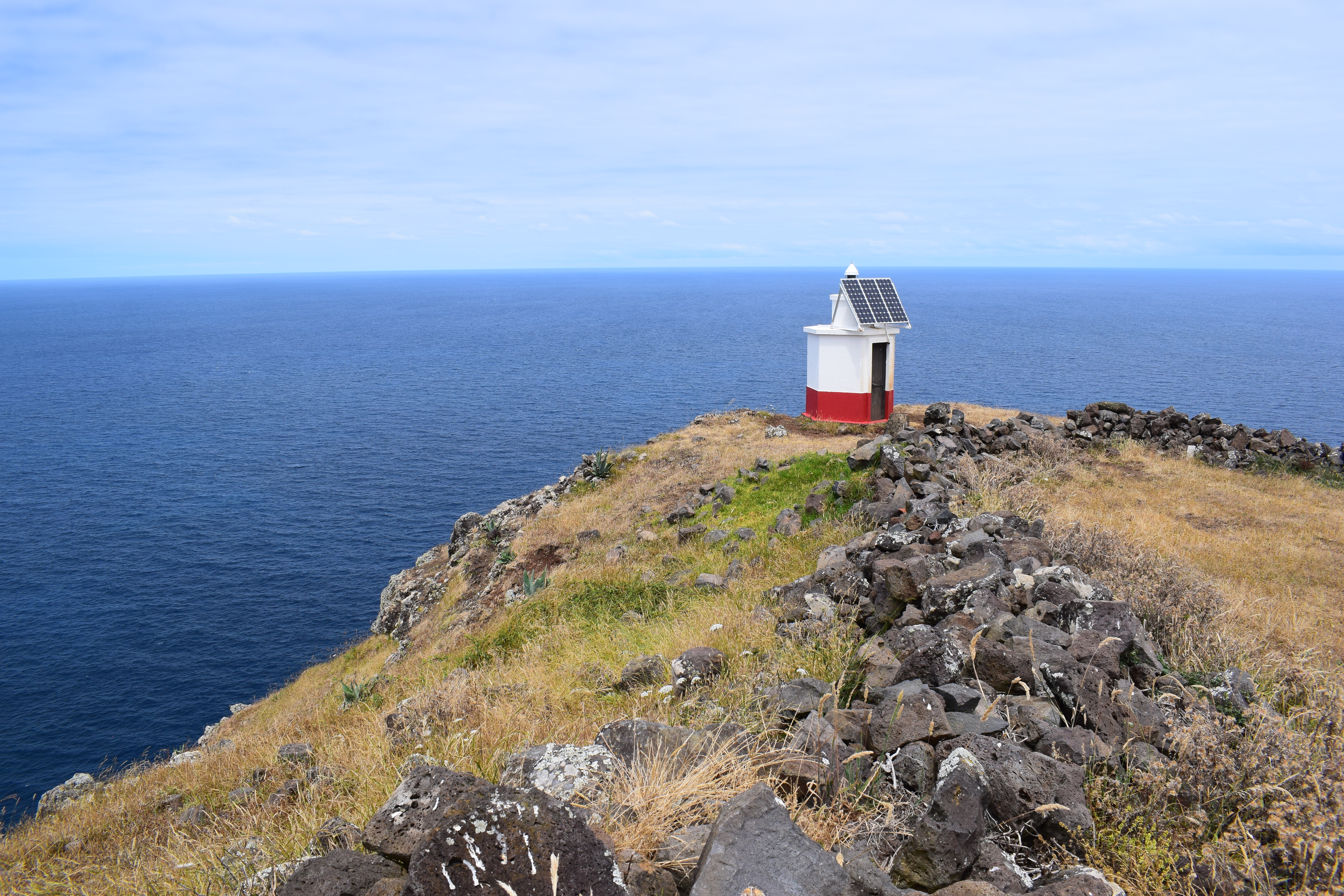
- Location: Ponta Norte; Cape Verde
- Coordinates: 16°51′5.2″N 22°54′54.3″W

Tower
- Constructed: 1897 (first); ~1940 (second, now in ruins)
- Foundation: concrete base
- Construction: metal skeletal tower (current) masonry tower (second)
- Height: 4.8 metres (16 ft) (current); 10.9 metres (36 ft) (second)
- Shape: square prism skeletal tower (current) cylindrical tower (second)
- Markings: white tower (second)
- Power source: solar power

Light
- Deactivated: ~1940 (first); ~1960 (second)
- Focal height: 16 metres (52 ft) (current)
- Range: 8 nautical miles (15 km; 9.2 mi)
- Characteristic: Fl (3) W 12s.
- Cape Verde no.: PT-2070

Farol de Ponta Norte is a lighthouse in the northernmost point of the island of Sal, Cape Verde. It is located near the headland Ponta Norte. The original lighthouse was a 13 metres high cast iron tower, constructed in 1897. This was replaced with a masonry tower around 1940, which is now in ruins. The current light is on a 5 metres metal tower.

== See also ==
- List of lighthouses in Cape Verde
- List of buildings and structures in Cape Verde
