= Funco (architecture) =

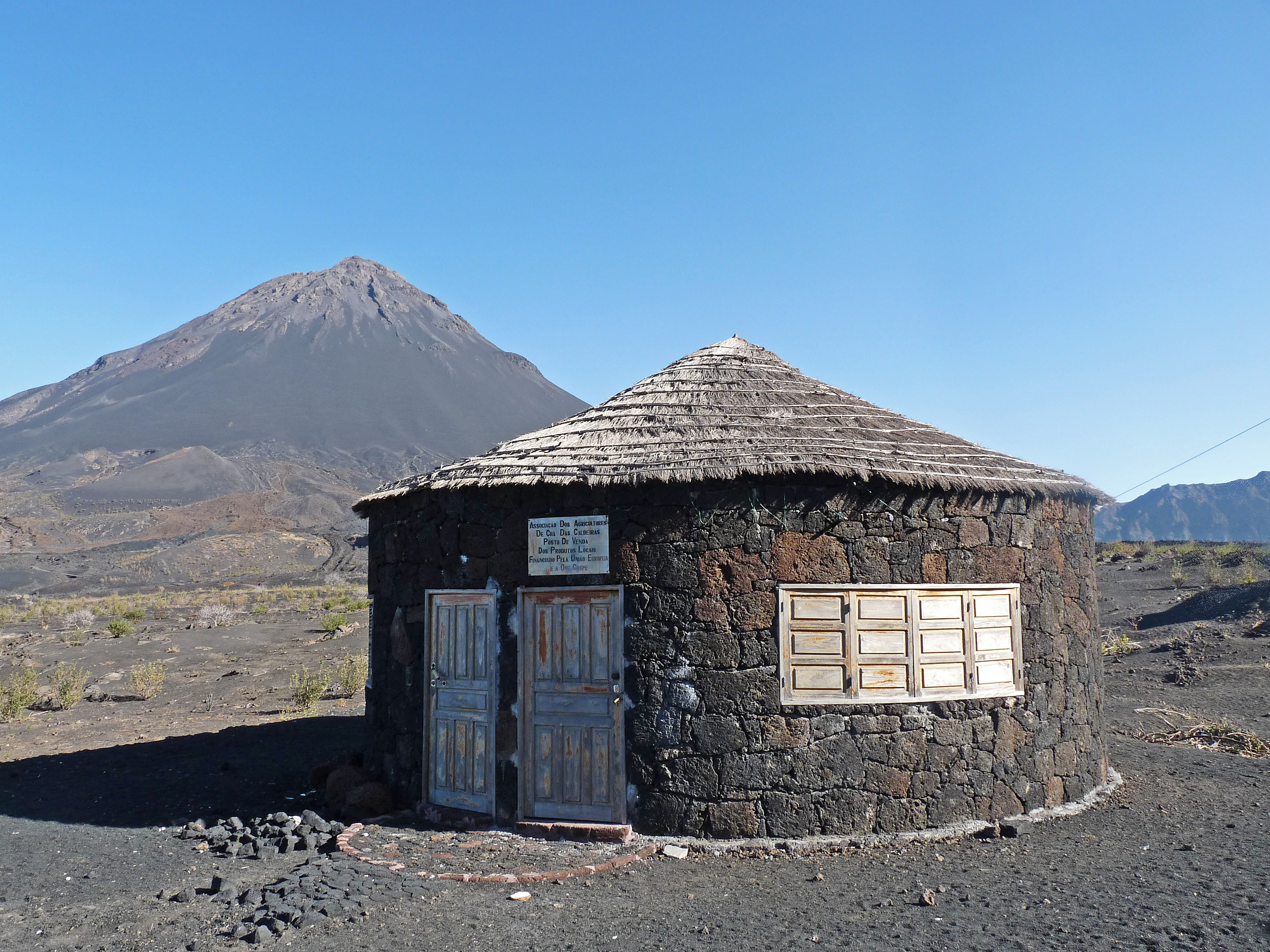
Funco out of volcanic rock at the foot of Pico do Fogo

Funco is a traditional Capeverdean house that originated in Africa.

These houses are represented in Guinea-Bissau, found mainly on the islands of Fogo, Santiago and Maio. Their circular form is made of different kinds of rock. The conical thatch roof is made of palm fronds.

Henrique Teixeira de Sousa explored the social structure of Fogo, his native island, in his novels and in his essays. He showed the concern of white families with the rise of mixed families in the late 1940s. They feared the moment that "the blacks would be pushed out of the funco; [where] they would take the place of the mixed in the loja and the latter would put the whites out of the sobrado."

According to António Carreira in 1965, the term was used to mean a "small, poor and miserable building".

== Examples ==
Examples of a funco house/building type include:

- A funco at Museu Municipal de São Filipe
- Chã das Caldeiras Vineyard and Tourist Attraction building has temporarily relocated to Cabeça Fundão
- Chã das Caldeiras Farmer's Association building – the original was destroyed during the 2014 eruption, temporarily relocated to Achada Furna or Cova Figueira – there may be a newer funco building rebuilt and may have moved there

Settlements named after this type of house style, (mainly) in the municipality of São Lourenço dos Órgãos, Santiago Island:

- Funco Bandeira
- Funco Marques

== Legacy ==
The Cape Verdean Architects’ Bar Association has created a Portal to discuss architecture, named “Funco” to honor this particular Cape Verdean form of building.

== See also ==
- Loja (architecture)
- Sobrado (architecture)
