= Ponta do Sinó Lighthouse =

Farol da Ponta do Sinó
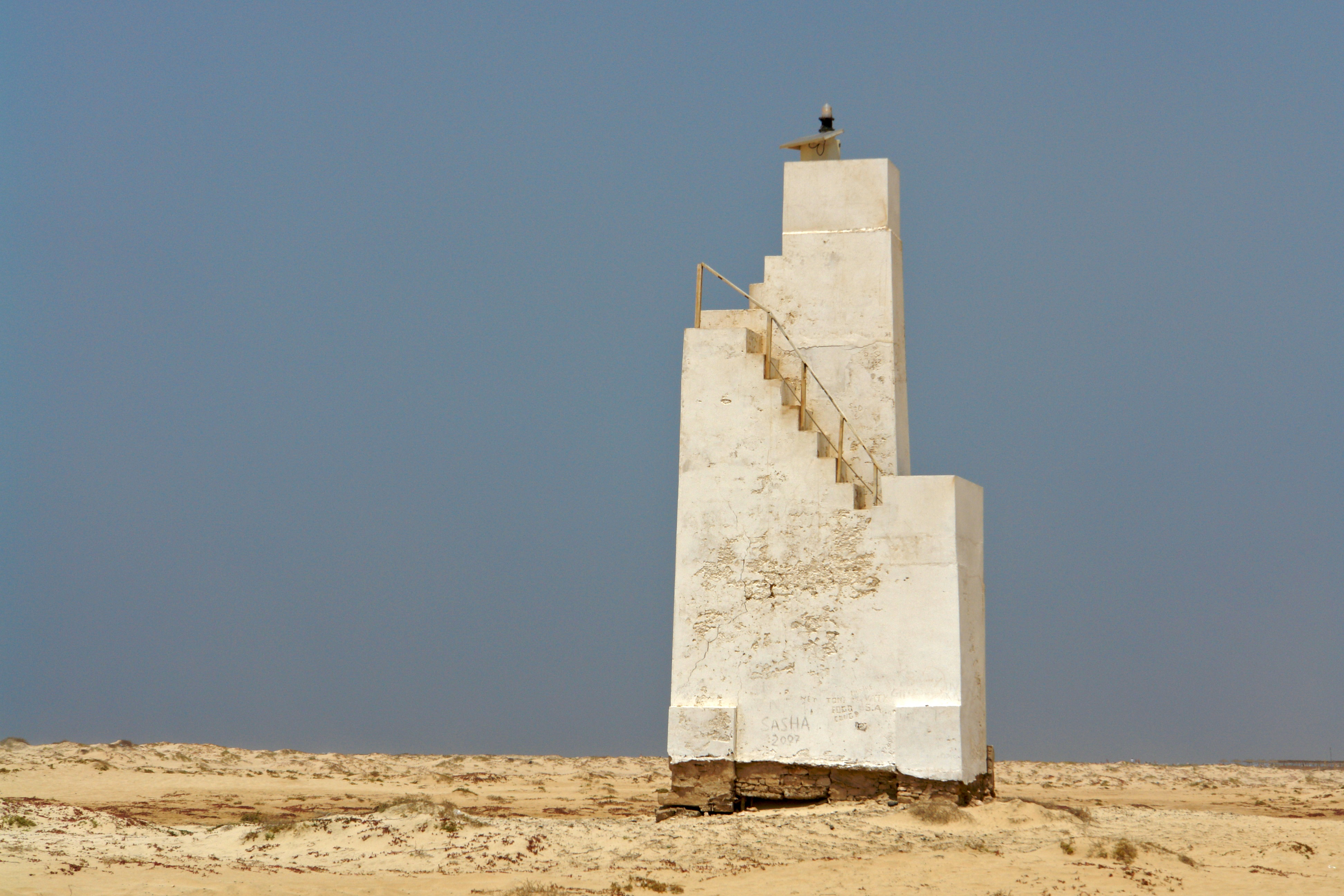
- Farol da Ponta do Sinó
- Location: Santa Maria; Sal; Cape Verde
- Coordinates: 16°35′20.37″N 22°55′17.39″W

Tower
- Constructed: 1892 (first); 2014 (second)
- Foundation: concrete base
- Construction: concrete tower
- Height: 9 metres (30 ft)
- Shape: square tower with light atop and external staircase
- Markings: white tower
- Power source: solar power

Light
- First lit: 2004
- Deactivated: 2014 (first, now in ruins)
- Focal height: 11 metres (36 ft)
- Range: 8 nautical miles (15 km; 9.2 mi)
- Characteristic: Fl (2+1) W 15s.

Farol da Ponta do Sinó is a lighthouse near Ponta do Sinó, the southernmost point of the island of Sal, Cape Verde. It is around 2 km southwest of the center of Santa Maria. The tower is quadrangular and is 9 meters tall and is made out of concrete, it has an outer staircase and features a lantern. All of the exterior are painted in white. The lighthouse was built in 1892. In early 2013, a second building with the same style was constructed and was finished before 2014 and became activated as the lighthouse moved to its new location. The lighthouse appears in the seminal 1983 movie Sans Soleil by French film maker Chris Marker.

== See also ==
- List of lighthouses in Cape Verde
- List of buildings and structures in Cape Verde
