= Nossa Senhora da Conceição church (Boa Vista) =

Our Lady of Conception church
- Igreja de Nossa Senhora da Conceição
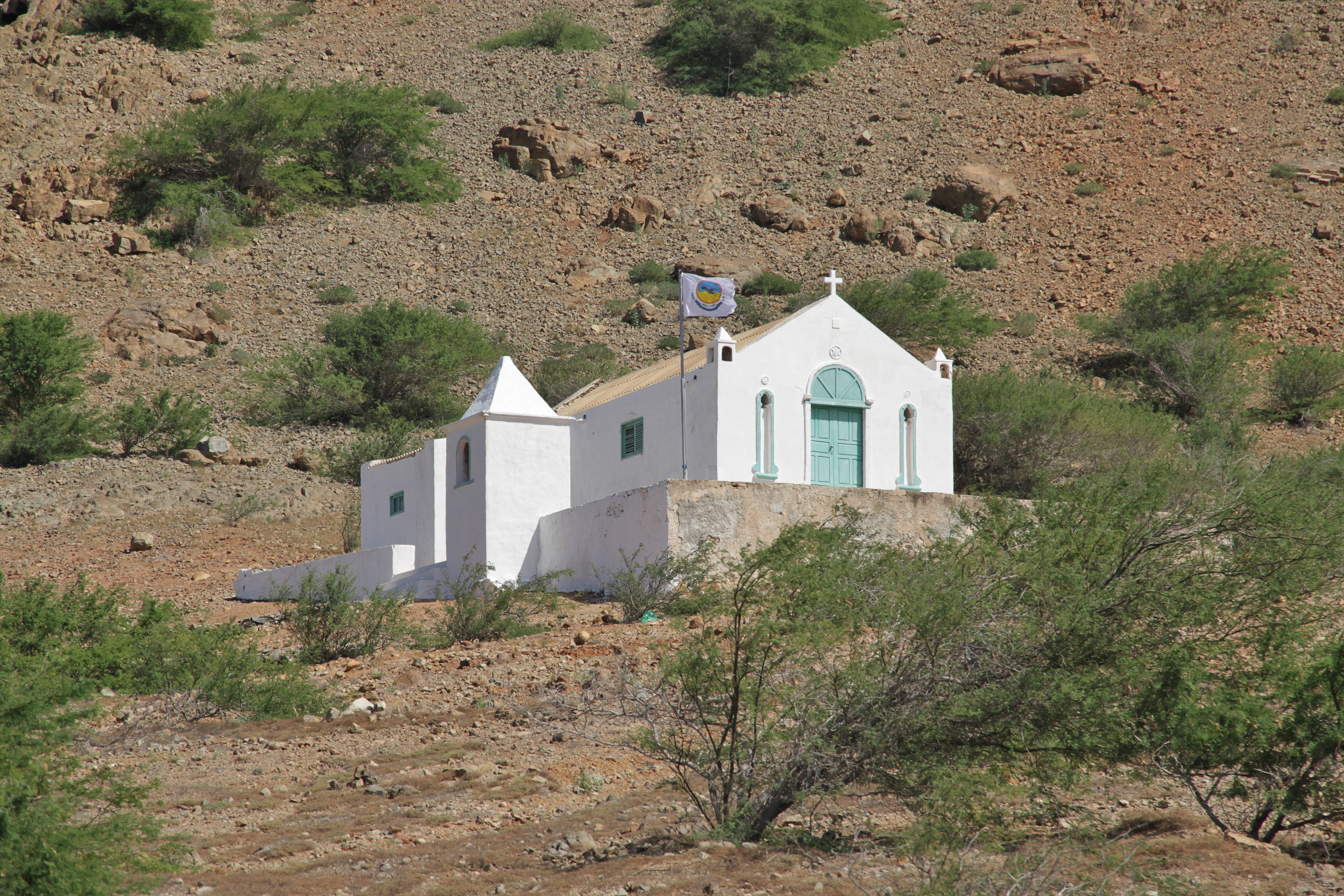
- The church of Our Lady of Conception at the foot of Rocha Estância

- Location within Cape Verde
- 16.0361°N 22.9161°W
- Location: Povoacao Velha, Boa Vista Island
- Country: Cape Verde
- Denomination: Roman Catholic Church

Architecture
- Completed: 1828

Nossa Senhora da Conceição church (Portuguese for Our Lady of Conception) is a church at the southeastern edge of the village Povoação Velha, on the island of Boa Vista, Cape Verde. It sits at the foot of the mountain Rocha Estância. It was built in 1828. Its interior is decorated with a colourfully painted chancel that has numerous little images of saints. Each year on December 8, the Feast of the Immaculate Conception is celebrated and forms one of the major religious celebrations on the island.

== See also ==
- List of buildings and structures in Cape Verde
- List of churches in Cape Verde
