= List of museums in Cape Verde =

This is a list of museums in Cape Verde.

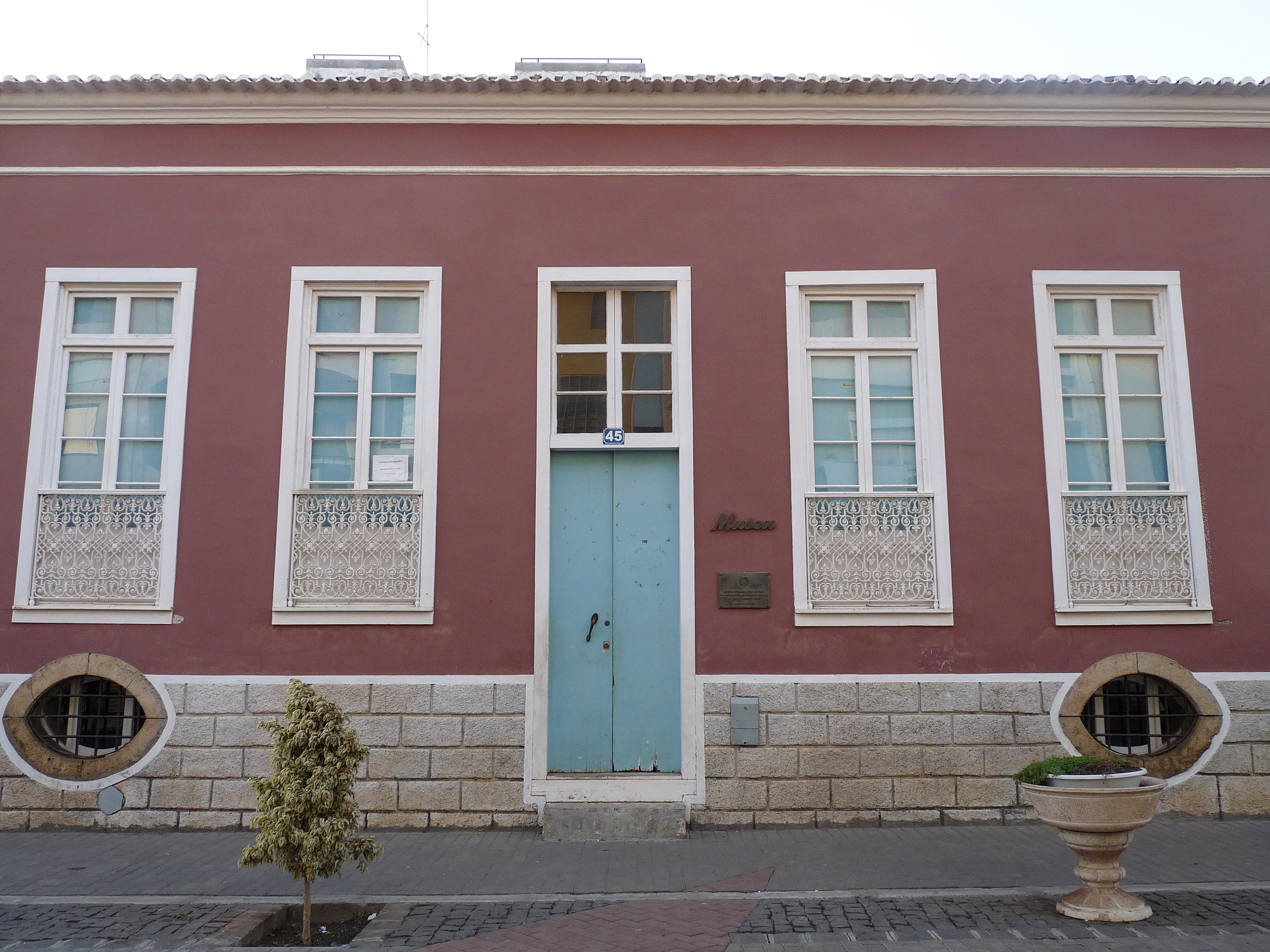
Museu Etnográfico da Praia, Santiago

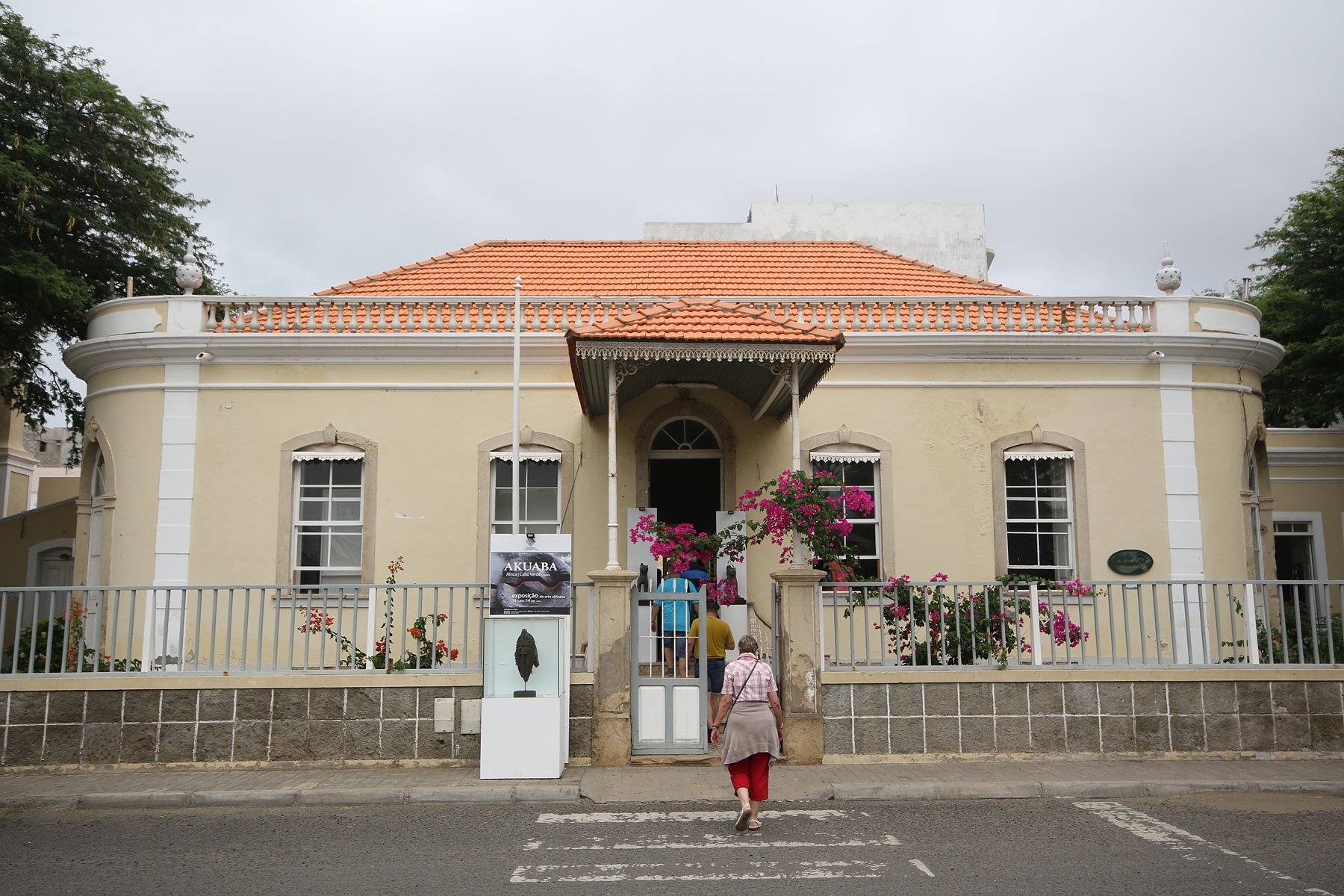
Centro Nacional de Artesanato e Design, Mindelo, São Vicente

== Museums in Cape Verde ==
=== Fogo ===
- São Filipe Municipal Museum

=== Santiago ===
- Museu Etnográfico da Praia, Praia
- Museu da Tabanca, Chã de Tanque
- Tarrafal concentration camp, Chão Bom

=== São Vicente ===
- Centro Nacional de Artesanato e Design, Mindelo

=== Sal ===
- Museo do Sal, Santa Maria

=== Boa Vista ===
- Museum dos Naufragos, Sal Rei
- Museu de Arqueologia da Boa Vista, Sal Rei

== See also ==
- List of museums
