= Loja (architecture) =

Grocery-bar in Cape Verde

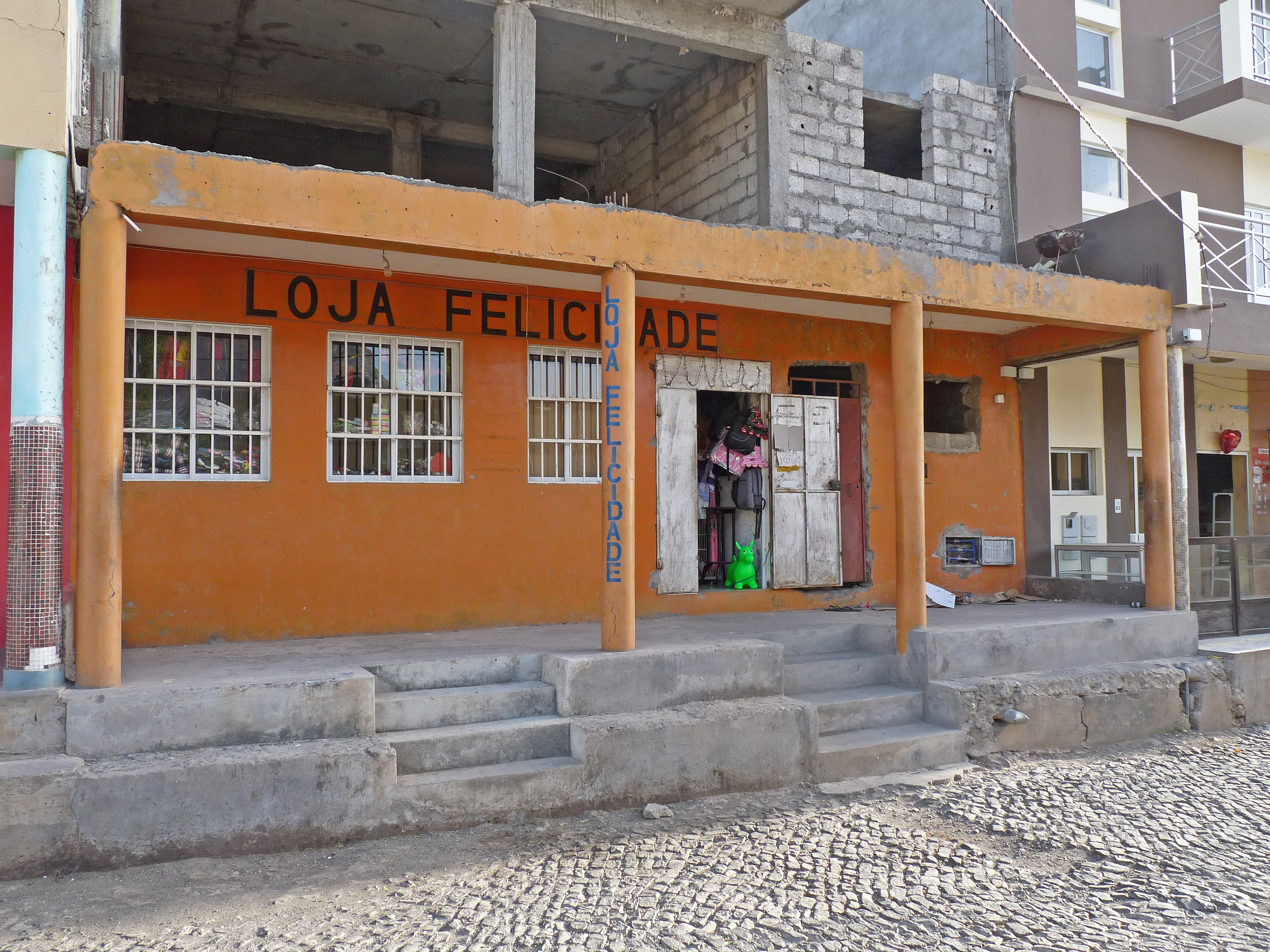
A loja in Tarrafal

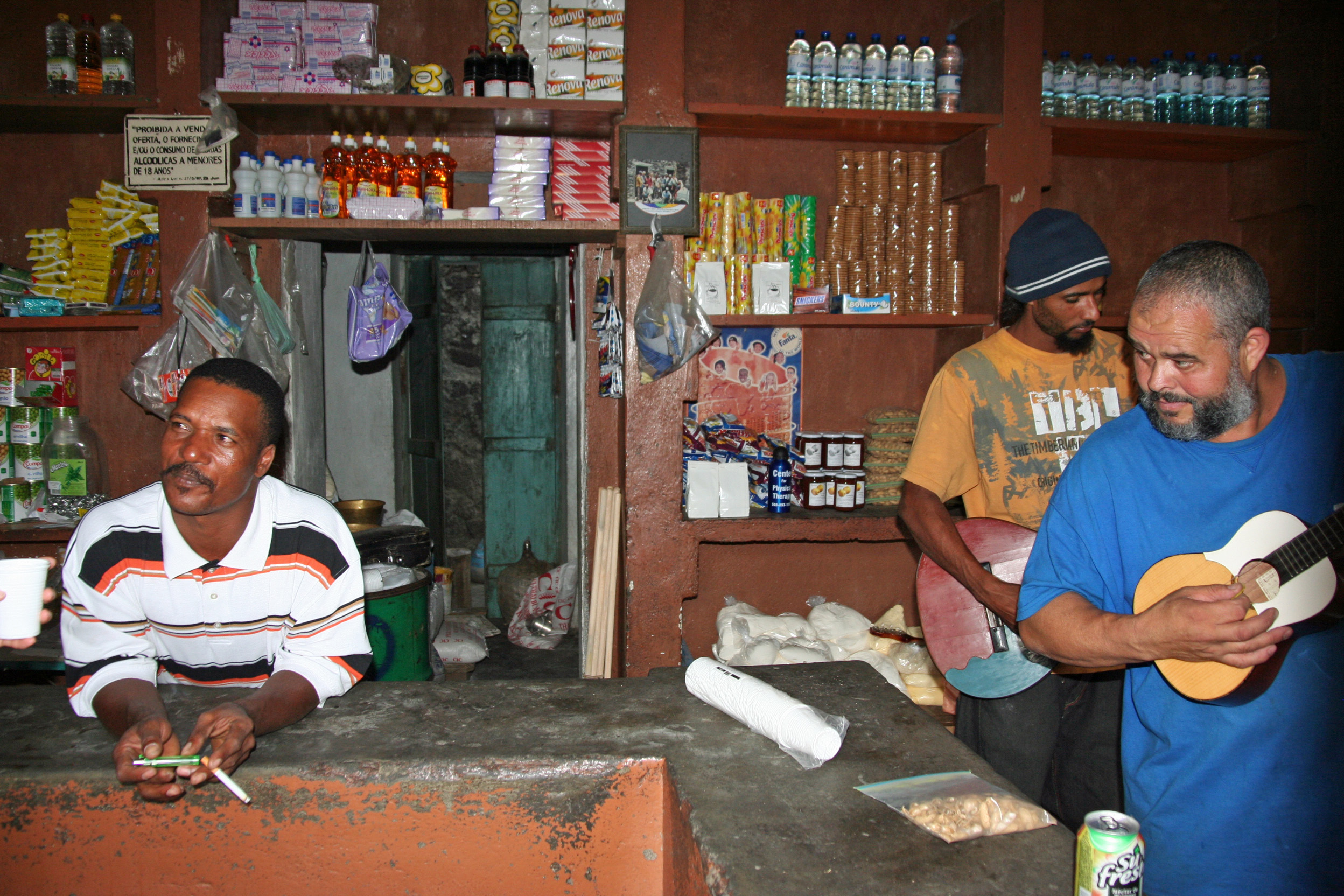
Musicians at a loja in Fogo

A loja is a kind of a grocery-bar or a characteristic boutique in Cape Verde, which makes up a subdivision of a Creole lifestyle.

The work of lojas, are found in both the town and the countryside. The boss stands right behind the bar counter where groceries and consumer goods are placed on shelves. Clients stay on the other side for a drink (men) or shop (women and children).

During the colonial era, lojas were founded throughout the Portuguese colonial empire in Africa. Notable goods included petroleum lamps, preserves, plastic sandals, matches, oils, fabrics, sugar, salt and pasta. These retail businesses were generally held by the mixed (mestiços) people who accepted the intermediate social level - albeit modest - enabled them to assert a form of a superiority over the indigenous people.

In an article by Henrique Teixeira de Sousa, it analyzed the social structure of Fogo, his native islands, both in his novels and in his essays, showed the concern of white families with the rise of the mixed in the late 1940s, they feared the moment that "the blacks would be pushed into the funco; [where] it would take the place of the mixed with the loja and the latter would put the Whites to the sobrado.

== See also ==
- Funco (architecture)
- Sobrado (architecture)
