= Museu Municipal de São Filipe =

Museu Municipal de São Filipe São Filipe Municipal Museum
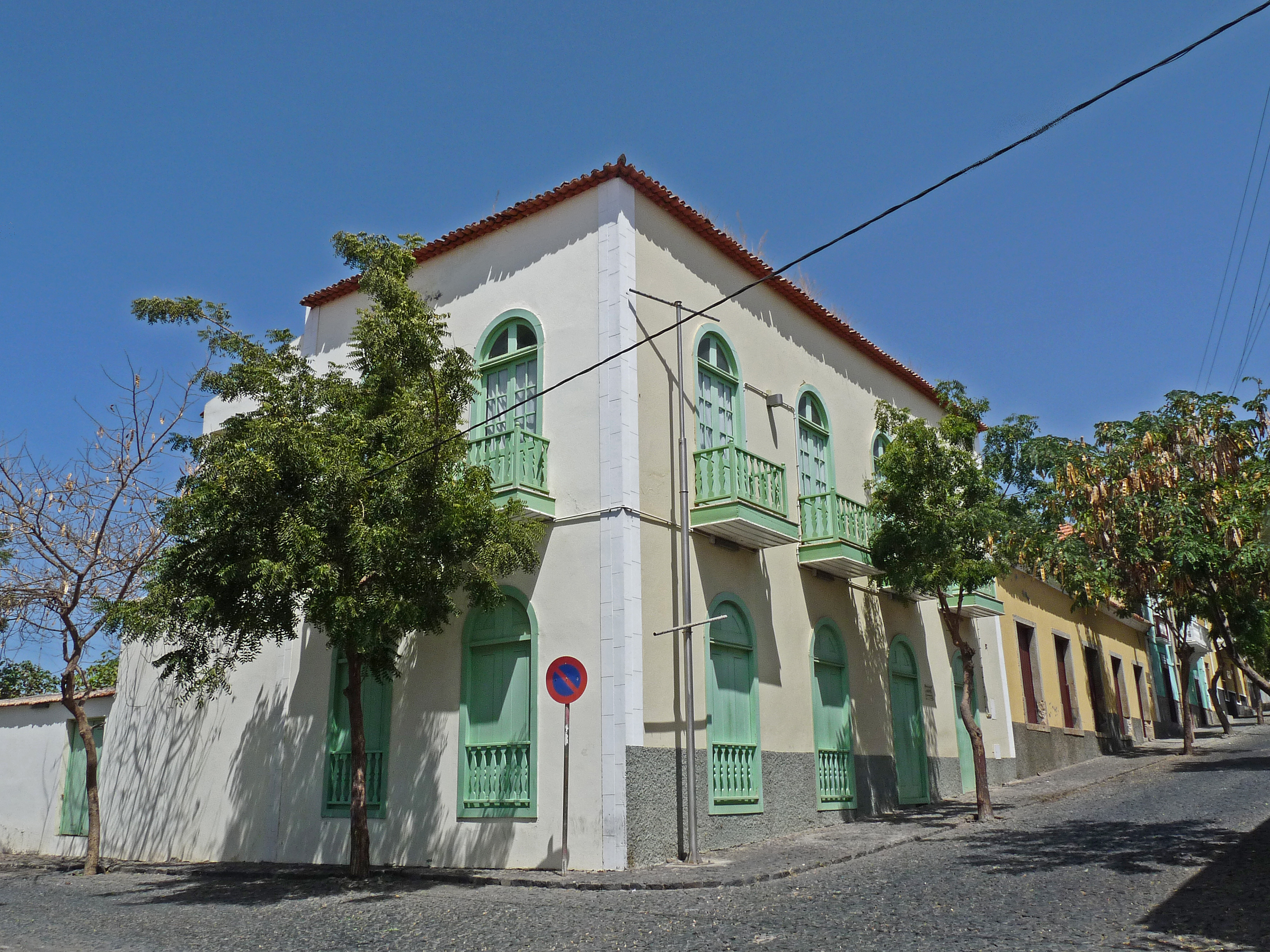
- Front of the museum next to the square

- Location within Cape Verde
- Established: December 13, 2008
- Location: São Filipe, Fogo, Cape Verde
- Coordinates: 14.8942°N 24.4999°W
- Type: Museum
- Collections: culture

Museu Municipal de São Filipe (Portuguese for "São Filipe Municipal Museum") is a museum located in the historic centre of São Filipe, on the island of Fogo, Cape Verde. It is located in a sobrado, a colonial town house. The museum was opened on December 13, 2008, by the town president Eugênio Miranda da Veiga.

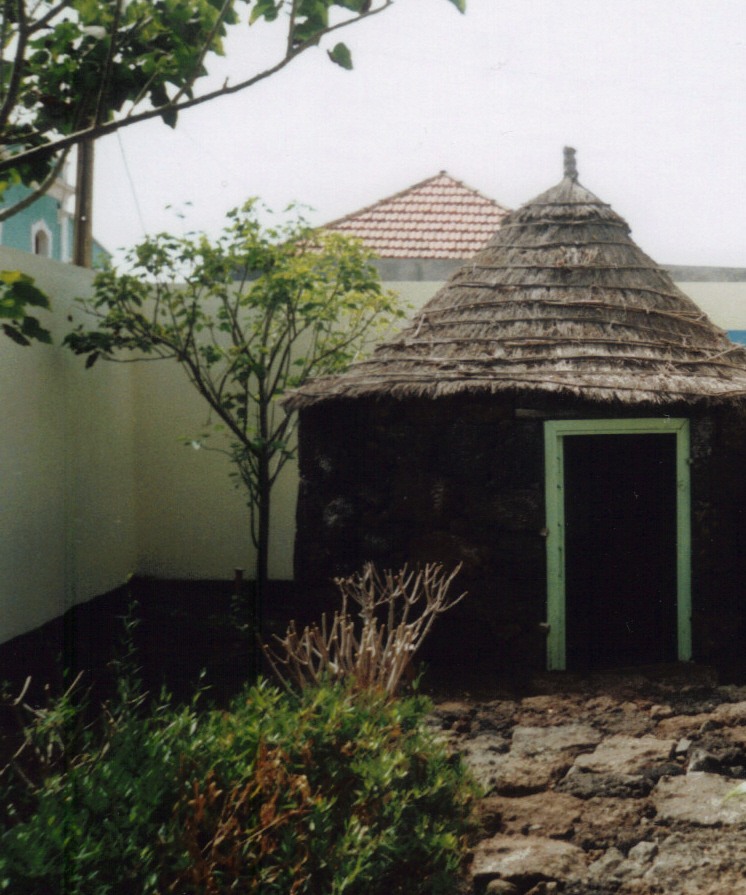
A traditional hut (funco) in the backyard of the museum

== See also ==
- List of museums in Cape Verde
- List of buildings and structures in Cape Verde
