= Povoação Velha =

- Settlement
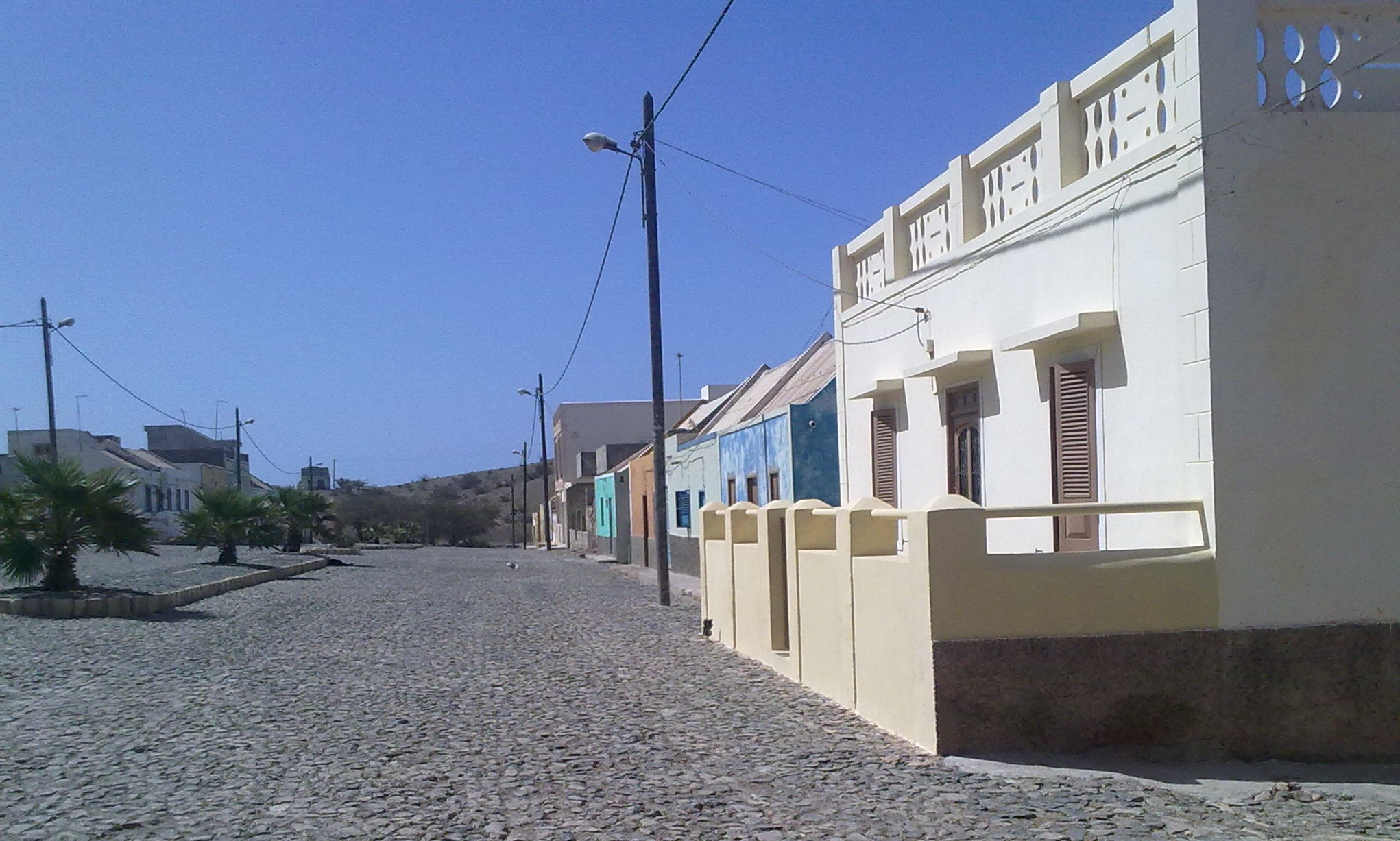

- Location within Cape Verde
- Coordinates: 16.038°N 22.917°W
- Country: Cape Verde
- Island: Boa Vista
- Municipality: Boa Vista
- Civil parish: Santa Isabel
- Elevation: 62 m (203 ft)

Population (2010)
  - Total: 309
- Postal code: 5111
- ID: 51203

Povoação Velha is a village in the southwestern part of the island of Boa Vista, Cape Verde. The village is around 16 km south of the island capital Sal Rei.

== Geography ==
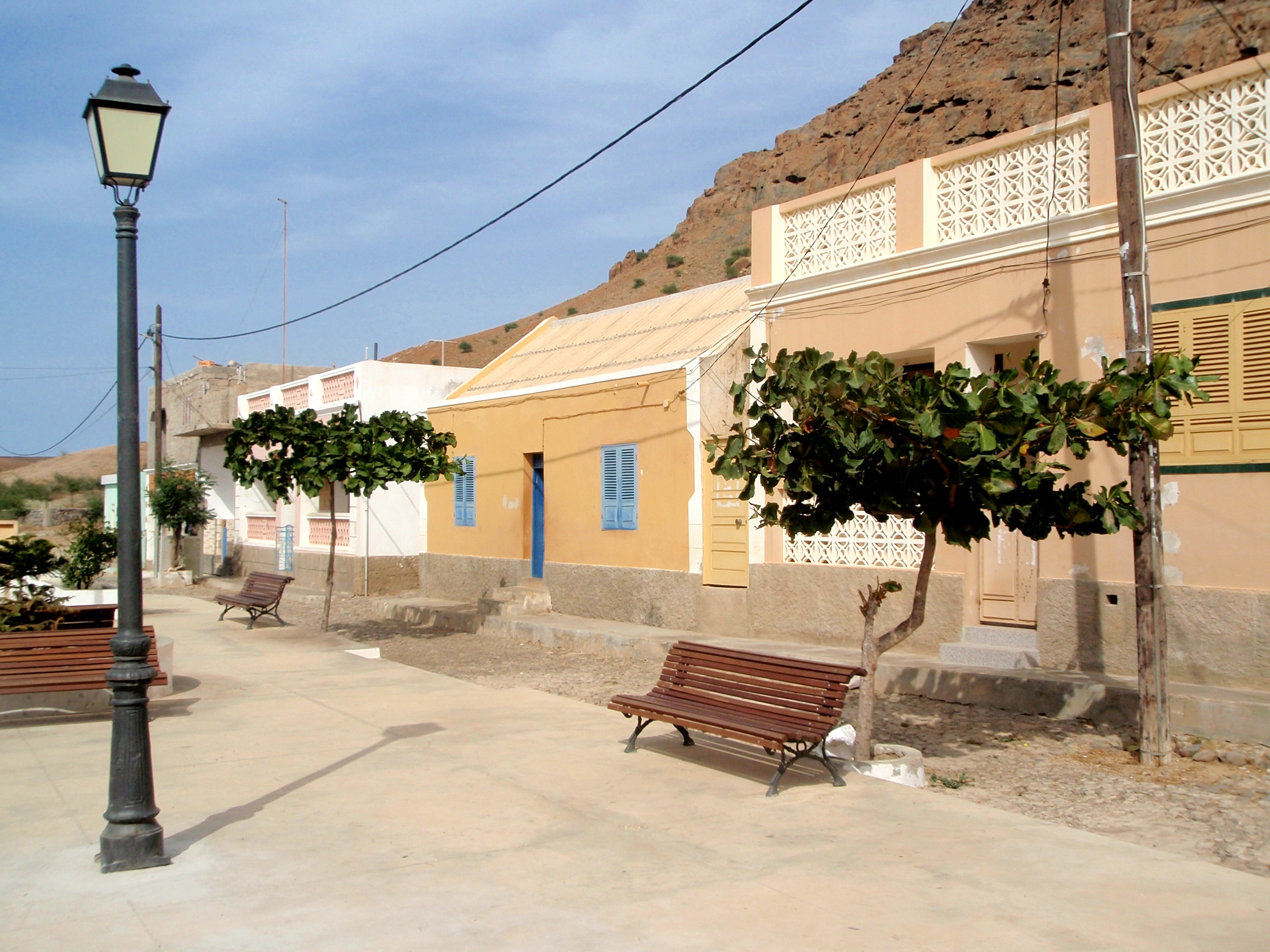
Praceta de Santo António, in Povoação Velha.

Povoação Velha is situated at the foot of the 357 m high Rocha Estância. To its south is Ribeira Baixa which flows south to the Atlantic. The sandy beach Praia de Santa Mónica lies near the mouth of Ribeira Baixa. Landmarks include the Chapel of Santo António (Saint Anthony) built in 1800, the church of Nossa Senhora da Conceição built in 1828 and Praceta de Santo António in the center. There is a health center in the village and a youth center.

== History ==
The community is the oldest settlement in the island (hence the name, which means "old settlement"), dating back to the late 16th century. Until 1810, it was the island capital. The 2010 census recorded 309 inhabitants. Hurricane Fred struck Boa Vista island in 2015, damaging 50 houses.

== Gallery ==
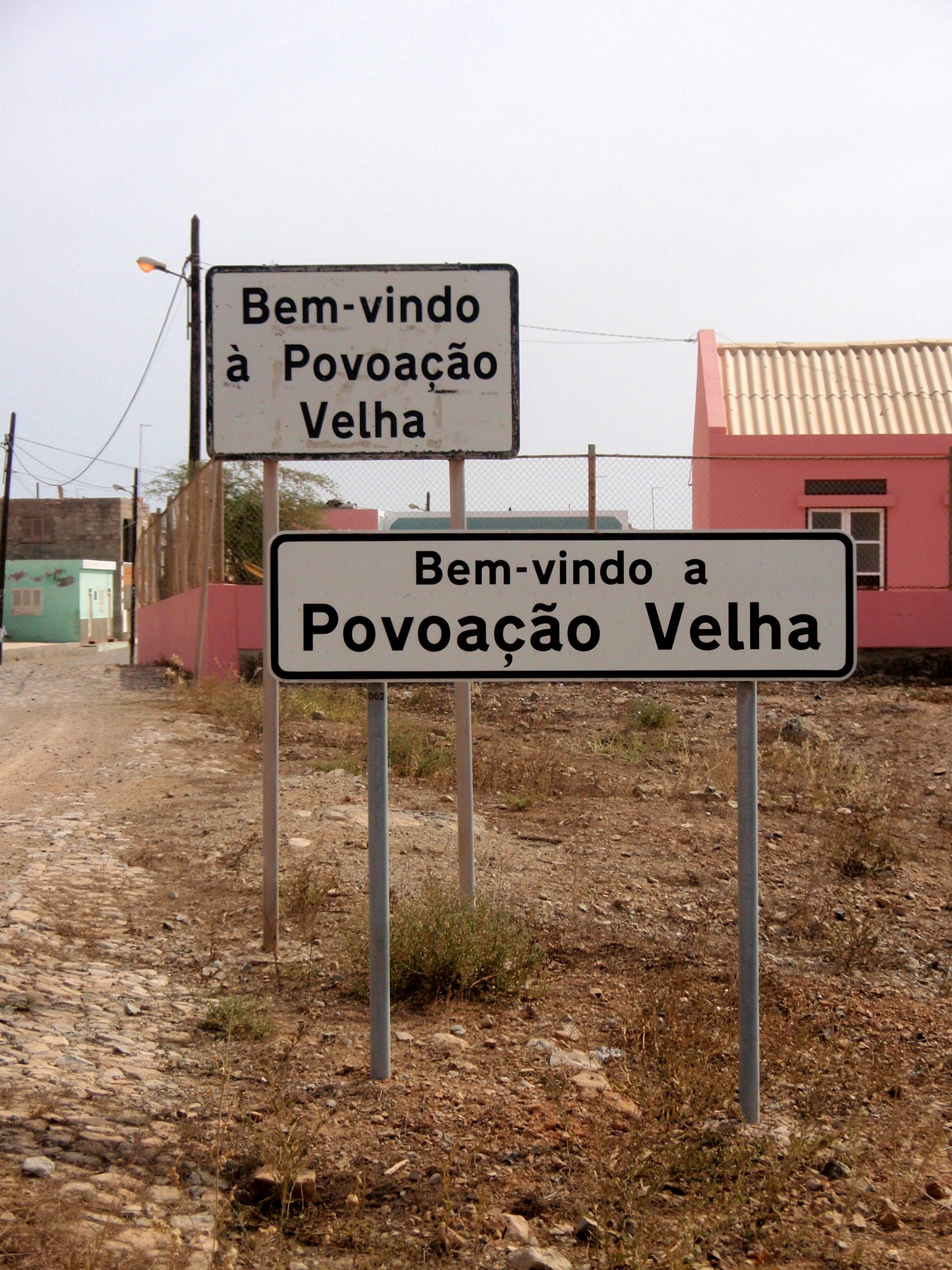
Povoação Velha welcome sign

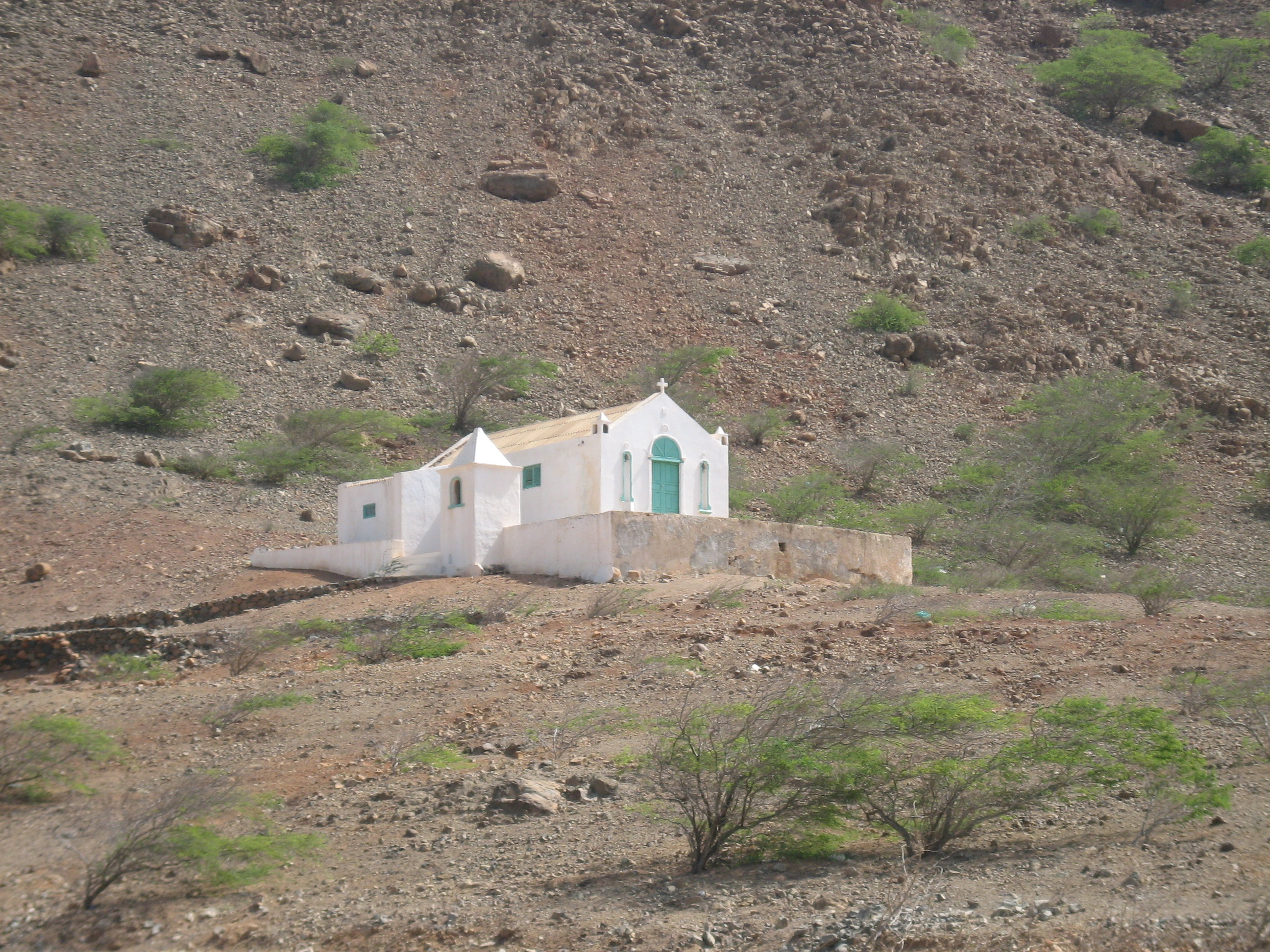
Nossa Senhora da Conceição church

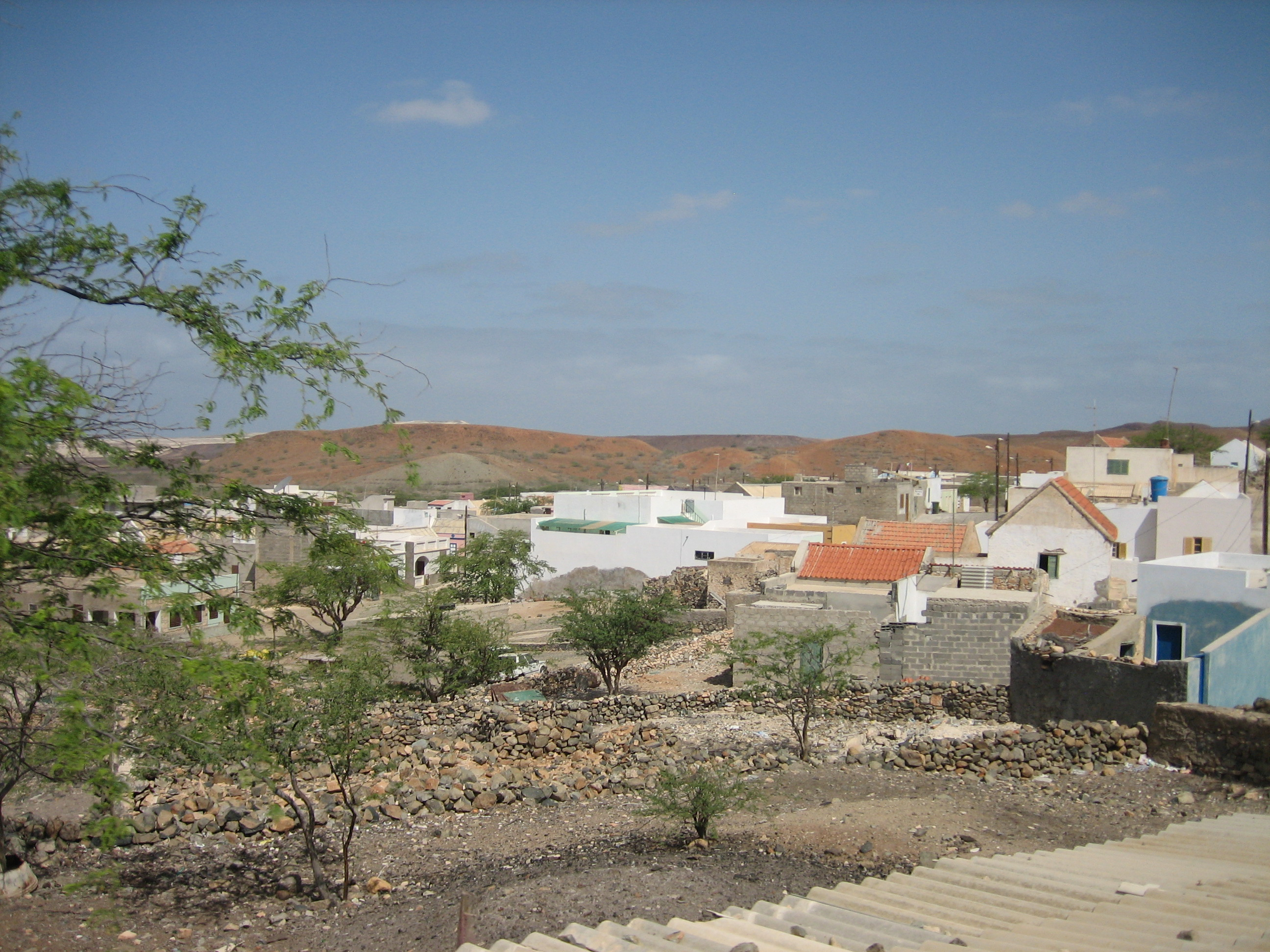
View of the village

== See also ==
- List of villages and settlements in Cape Verde
