= Pedra de Lume Lighthouse =

Farol de Pedra de Lume (rear)
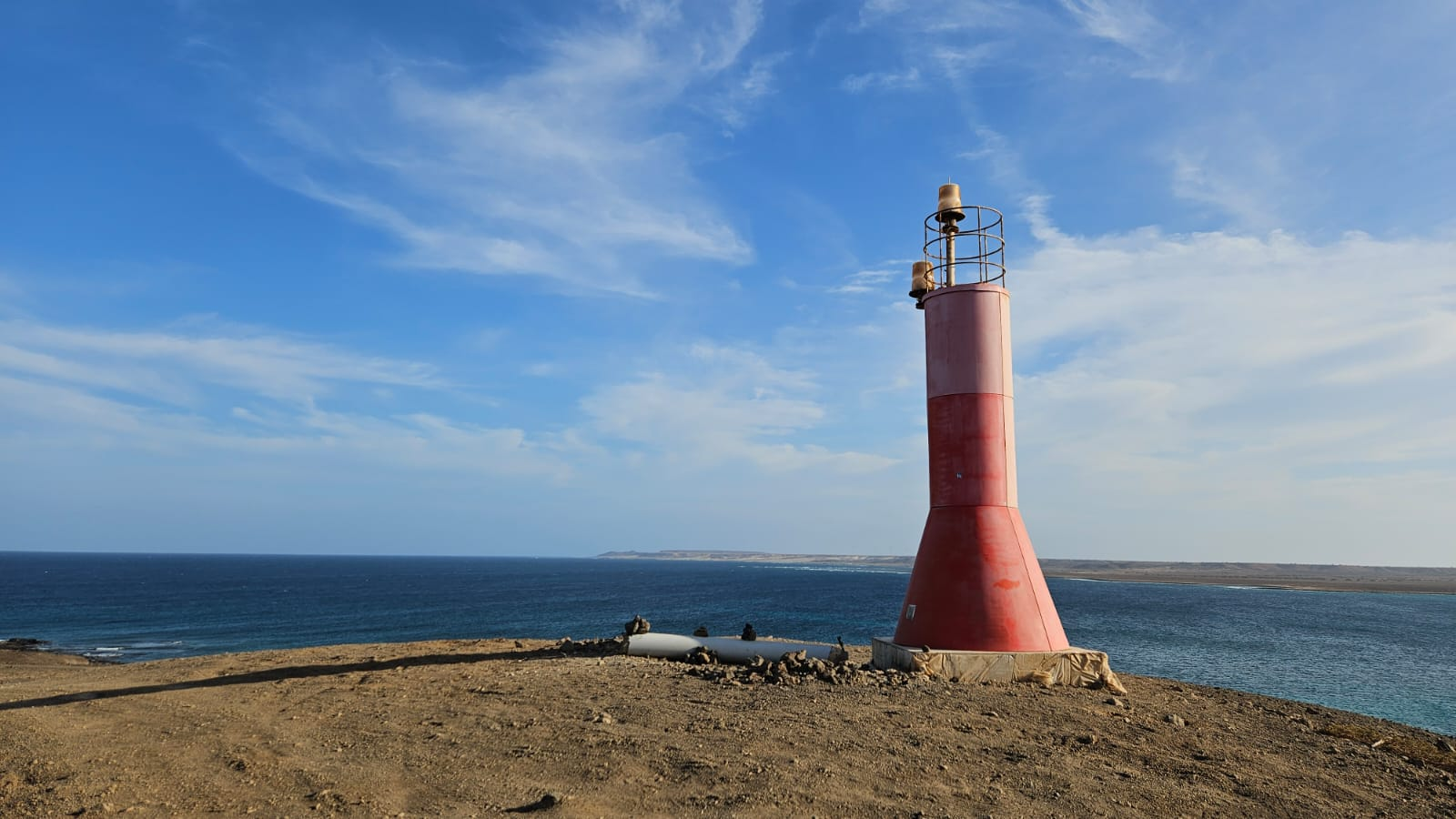
- Pedra de Lume lighthouse
- Location: Pedra de Lume; Sal; Cape Verde
- Coordinates: 16°45′50.1″N 22°53′34.2″W

Tower
- Constructed: 1855
- Construction: masonry building
- Height: 26 feet (7.9 m)
- Operator: private

Light
- Focal height: 13 metres (43 ft)
- Range: 1 nautical mile (1.9 km; 1.2 mi)
- Characteristic: F R (occasional)
- Cape Verde no.: 2026

Farol de Pedra de Lume is a lighthouse in the eastern point of the island of Sal in northeastern Cape Verde at the small port of Pedra de Lume and 5 km east of the city of Espargos. The chapel was completed in 1853, the lighthouse was completed in 1855.

== See also ==
- List of lighthouses in Cape Verde
