= List of Portuguese colonial forts =

Overview of Portuguese colonial forts

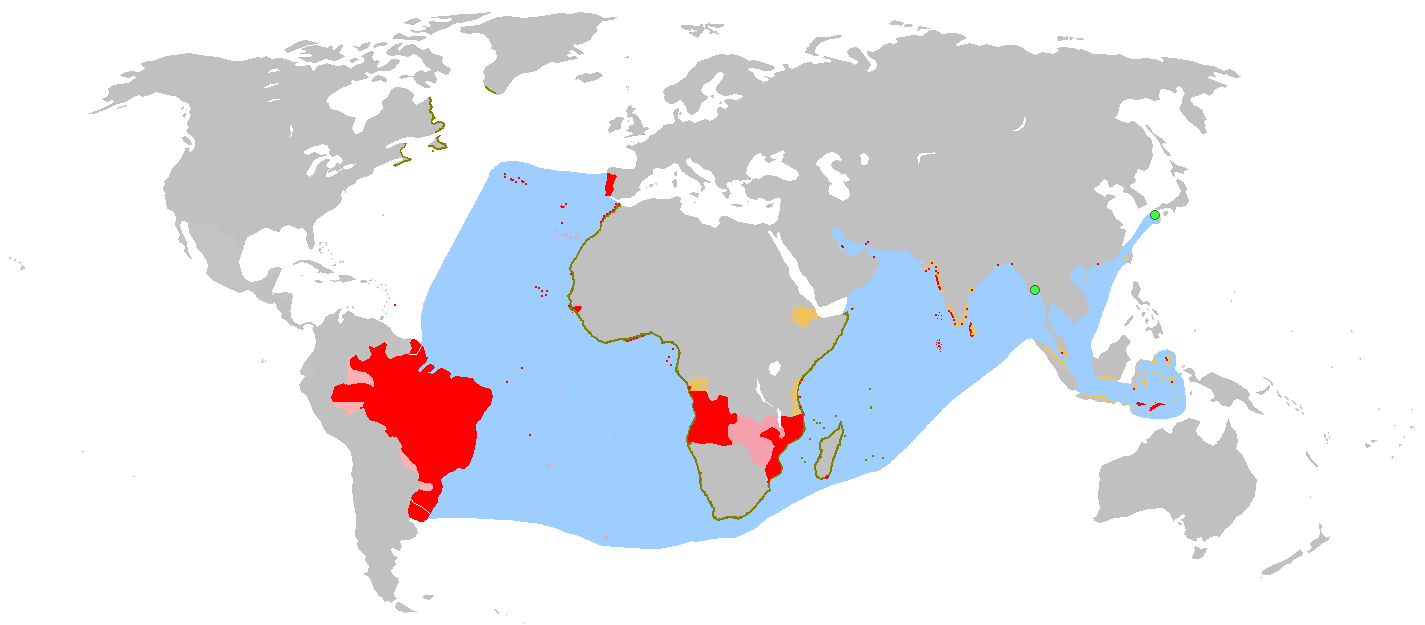
A map of the Portuguese Empire and its claims, strongholds, trade waters, and economic interests.

This article will list all fortifications that were built, partially built, or ordered to be built by the Portuguese throughout the globe. All forts in this list are outside the modern territory of Portugal, and were built for the purpose of colonialism and the Portuguese Empire. Some of the forts were in Portuguese hands for a brief period - often a few years before the Portuguese were expelled, while others were held for centuries.

Portuguese explorers have discovered many lands and the sea routes in the 15th–18th centuries during the Age of Discovery. Along the way they built outposts and fortresses, many of which still exist today all over the world. These forts are often similar in design and are therefore easy to recognize.

== List of forts by region ==
=== Africa ===
Name	Built	Condition	Image	City/Region	Current country	Historical rulers
EN: Elmina Castle; PT: Castelo de São Jorge da Mina	1482	Intact		Elmina	Ghana	Portugal (1482–1637); Netherlands (1637–1872); Britain (1872–1957)
EN: Fort Cacheu; PT: Forte de Cacheu	1588	Intact		Cacheu	Guinea-Bissau	Portugal (1588–1974)
EN: Fort Duke of Braganza; PT: Forte Duque de Bragança	1820	Ruins		Ilhéu de Sal Rei	Cape Verde	Portugal (1820–1975)
EN: Fort Jesus; PT: Forte Jesus de Mombaça	1593–1596	Intact		Mombasa	Kenya	Portugal (1593–1698, 1728–1729); Oman (1698–1741, 1837–1895); Local rule (1741–1837); Britain (1895–1963)
EN: Fort Saint Anthony; PT: Forte de Santo António	1515	Intact		Axim	Ghana	Portugal (1515–1642); Netherlands (1642–1872); Britain (1872–1957)
EN: Fort Saint Cajetan; PT: Forte de São Caetano de Sofala	1505	Decimated		Sofala	Mozambique	Portugal (1505–1975)
EN: Fort Saint Sebastian; PT: Forte de São Sebastião de Xama	1520–1526	Intact		Shama	Ghana	Portugal (1520–1642); Netherlands (1642–1872); Britain (1872–1957)
EN: Fort Saint Sebastian; PT: Forte de São Sebastião	1558	Intact		Island of Mozambique	Mozambique	Portugal (1558–1975)
EN: Fort Saint Sebastian; PT: Forte de São Sebastião	1575	Intact		São Tomé	São Tomé and Príncipe	Portugal (1575–1641, 1644–1975); Netherlands (1641–1644)
EN: Fortress of Kambambe; PT: Fortaleza de Cambambe	1604	Ruins		Cambambe	Angola	Portugal (1604–1975)
EN: Fortress of Mazagan; PT: Fortaleza de Mazagão	1514	Intact		El Jadida	Morocco	Portugal (1514–1769); Morocco (1769–1912); France (1912–1956)
EN: Fortress of Muxima; PT: Fortaleza da Muxima	1599	Intact		Muxima	Angola	Portugal (1599–1641, 1648–1975); Netherlands (1641–1648)
EN: Fortress of Saint John the Baptist of Ouidah; PT: Fortaleza de São João Batista de Ajudá	1721	Intact		Ouidah	Benin	Portugal (1721–1961)
EN: Fortress of Saint Joseph Amura; PT: Fortaleza de São José da Amura	1697	Restored		Bissau	Guinea-Bissau	Portugal (1697–1974)
EN: Fortress of Saint Michael; PT: Fortaleza de São Miguel	1576	Intact		Luanda	Angola	Portugal (1576–1641, 1648–1975); Netherlands (1641–1648)
EN: Royal Castle of Mogador; PT: Castelo Real de Mogador	1506	Demolished		Essaouira	Morocco	Portugal (1506–1510)
EN: Royal Fort of Saint Philip; PT: Forte Real de São Filipe	1587–1593	Intact		Cidade Velha	Cape Verde	Portugal (1587–1975)
EN: Royal Walls of Ceuta; PT: Muralhas Reais de Ceuta	1540s	Intact		Ceuta	Spain	Portugal (1415–1668)
EN: Stronghold of Saint Lawrence; PT: Fortim de São Lourenço	1695	Intact		Island of São Lourenço	Mozambique	Portugal (1695–1975)

=== Americas ===
Name	Built	Condition	Image	City/Region	Current country	Historical rulers
EN: Fort of Our Lady of Medicines; PT: Forte de Nossa Senhora dos Remédios	1737	Ruins		Fernando de Noronha	Brazil	Portugal (1737–1822)
EN: Fort of Saint Anthony Barra; PT: Forte de Santo Antônio da Barra	1596	Restored		Salvador	Brazil	Portugal (1596–1822); Netherlands (1624–1625)
EN: Fort of Saint Anthony Beyond Carmo; PT: Forte de Santo Antônio Além do Carmo	1695–1703	Intact		Salvador	Brazil	Portugal (1695–1822)
EN: Fort Saint Anthony of Gurupá; PT: Forte de Santo Antônio de Gurupá	1601–1619	Restored		Gurupá	Brazil	Netherlands (1601–1623); Portugal (1623–1822)
EN: Fort of Saint James; PT: Forte de São Diogo	1609	Intact		Salvador	Brazil	Portugal (1609–1822); Netherlands (1624–1625)
EN: Fort of Saint Lawrence; PT: Forte de São Lourenço	1631	Restored		Itaparica	Brazil	Portugal (1631–1822); Netherlands (1647)
EN: Fort of Saint Marcellus; PT: Forte de São Marcelo	1608–1623	Intact		Salvador	Brazil	Portugal (1608–1822); Netherlands (1624–1625)
EN: Fort of Saint Mary; PT: Forte de Santa Maria	1614	Intact		Salvador	Brazil	Portugal (1614–1822); Netherlands (1624–1625)
EN: Fort of Saint Michael; PT: Forte de São Miguel	1737	Intact		Dieciocho de Julio	Uruguay	Portugal (1737–1763); Spain (1763–1816); Portugal (1816–1822); Brazil (1822–1828)
EN: Fort Santana; PT: Forte de Santana	1775	Ruins		Fernando de Noronha	Brazil	Portugal (1775–1822)
EN: Fort of the Three Wise Men; PT: Forte dos Reis Magos	1599	Intact		Natal	Brazil	Portugal (1599–1633, 1654–1822); Netherlands (1633–1654)
EN: Fortress of the Holy Cross of Anhatomirim; PT: Fortaleza de Santa Cruz de Anhatomirim	1739–1744	Intact		Governador Celso Ramos	Brazil	
EN: Fortress of the Holy Cross of Barra; PT: Fortaleza de Santa Cruz da Barra	1612	Intact		Niterói	Brazil	Portugal (1612–1822)
EN: Fortress of Our Lady of the Assumption; PT: Fortaleza de Nossa Senhora da Assunção	1812	Intact		Fortaleza	Brazil	Portugal (1812–1822)
EN: Fortress of Our Lady of Conception; PT: Fortaleza de Nossa Senhora da Conceição	1718	Intact		Rio de Janeiro	Brazil	Portugal (1718–1822)
EN: Fortress of Our Lady of Pleasures; PT: Fortaleza de Nossa Senhora dos Prazeres	1767–1769	Intact		Paranaguá	Brazil	Portugal (1767–1822)
EN: Fortress of Saint Teresa; PT: Fortaleza de Santa Teresa	1762	Intact		Santa Teresa National Park	Uruguay	Portugal (1762–1763); Spain (1763–1816); Portugal (1816–1822); Brazil (1822–1828)

=== Asia-Pacific ===
Name	Built	Condition	Image	City/region	Current country	Historical rulers
EN: Al Jalali Fort; PT: Forte Aljalali; Orig: Forte de São João	1586	Restored		Muscat	Oman	Portugal (1586–1650); Muscat (1650–1820); Muscat & Oman (1820–1892); Britain (1892–1970)
EN: Arippu Fort; PT: Forte Arippu	17th century	Ruins		Mannar	Sri Lanka	Portugal (17th century-1658); Netherlands (1658–1796); Britain (1796–1948)
EN: Balibo Fort; PT: Forte Balibo	1645–1665	Intact		Balibo	(Timor-Leste) East Timor	Portugal (1645–1975); Indonesia (1975–1999); UNTAET (1999–2002)
EN: Batticaloa Fort; PT: Forte Batticaloa	1622–1628	Intact		Batticaloa	Sri Lanka	Portugal (1622–1638); Netherlands (1638–1796); Britain (1796–1948)
EN: Cabo de Rama Fort; PT: Forte do Cabo da Rama	1763	Ruins		Canacona	India	Portugal (1763–1961)
EN: Castle of the Waterpoint; PT: Castella de Aguada; Orig: Forte de Bandorá	1640	Intact		Mumbai	India	Portugal (1640–1661); Britain (1661–1947)
EN: Chapora Fort; PT: Forte de Chaporá	1717	Ruins		Chapora	India	Portugal (1717–1961)
EN: Cranganore Fort; PT: Forte de Cranganore; Orig: Fortaleza da São Tomé	1523	Ruins		Kodungallur	India	Portugal (1523–1662); Netherlands (1662–1796); Britain (1796–1947)
EN: Diu Fortress; PT: Fortaleza de Diu; Orig: Fortaleza de São Tomé	1535	Intact		Diu	India	Portugal (1535–1961)
EN: Dongri Fort; PT: Forte de Dongri	1596	Ruins		Mumbai	India	Portugal (1596-1739); Maratha (1739-1818); Britain (1818–1947)
EN: The Famous; PT: A Famosa	1511	Fragments		Malacca	Malaysia	Portugal (1511–1641); Netherlands (1641–1795, 1818–1824); Britain (1795–1818, 1824–1956); Japan (1942–1945)
EN: Fort Al-Mirani; PT: Forte de Almirani	16th century	Restored		Muscat	Oman	Portugal (16th century-1650); Ottoman Empire (1552, 1581–1588); Muscat (1650–1820); Muscat & Oman (1820–1892); Britain (1892–1970)
EN: Fort Anjediva; PT: Forte de Angediva	1505	Demolished		Anjediva Island	India	Portugal (1505–1961)
EN: Fort Emmanuel; PT: Forte de Manuel	1503	Ruins		Kochi	India	Portugal (1503–1663); Netherlands (1663–1795); Britain (1795–1947)
EN: Fort Kastela; PT: Fortaleza de Ternate; Orig: São João Baptista de Ternate	1522	Ruins		Ternate	Indonesia	Portugal (1522–1575); Ternate (1575–1606); Spain (1606–1663); Netherlands (1663–1942, 1945–1946); Japan (1942–1945); East Indonesia (1946–1950)
EN: Fort Victoria, Our Lady of Annunciation Fortress; PT: Fortaleza Nossa Senhora de Anunciada	1575	Intact		Ambon, Maluku	Indonesia	Portugal (1575–1605); Netherlands (1605–1946); Britain (1810–1814); Japan (1942-1945); East Indonesia (1946–1950); Republic of South Maluku (1950)
EN: Fort of Our Lady of the Conception; PT: Forte de Nossa Senhora da Conceição	1515	Fragments		Hormuz	Iran	
EN: Fort Qeshm; PT: Forte de Queixome	1621	Ruins		Qeshm	Iran	Portugal (1621–1622)
EN: Fort St. Anthony of Simbor; PT: Forte de Santo António de Simbor	1722	Restored		Simbor	India	Portugal (1722–1961)
EN: Fort Tarout; PT: Forte de Tarout	1515–1520	Intact		Tarout Island	Saudi Arabia	Portugal (1515–1559)
EN: Fortress of the Watering Place; PT: Fortaleza da Aguada	1612	Intact		Sinquerim	India	Portugal (1612–1961)
EN: Galle Fort; PT: Forte de Galle	1584	Intact		Galle	Sri Lanka	Portugal (1584–1640); Netherlands (1640–1796); Britain (1796–1948)
EN: Ghodbunder Fort; PT: Forte de Ghodbunder	1550–1730	Ruins		Thane	India	Portugal (1550–1737); Maratha (1737–1818); Britain (1818–1947)
EN: Guia Fortress; PT: Fortaleza da Guia	1622–1638	Intact		Macau	China	Portugal (1622–1999)
EN: Khasab Fort; PT: Forte de Caçapo	17th century	Restored		Khasab	Oman	
EN: Korlai Fort; PT: Forte de Korlai; Orig: Fortaleza do Morro de Chaul	1521	Ruins		Korlai	India	Ahmadnagar (1521–1594); Portugal (1594–1739); Maratha (1739–1818); Britain (1818–1947)
EN: Madh Fort; PT: Forte de Madh	17th century	Intact		Mumbai	India	Portugal (17th century); Britain (1661–1947)
EN: Malé Fort; PT: Forte de Malé	17th century	Demolished		Maldives	Maldives	Portugal (1558–1650); Netherlands (1650–1796); Britain (1796–1953)
EN: Mormugão fort PT: Forte de Mormugão	1624	Ruins		Mormugao	India	Portugal (1624–1961)
EN: Mount Fortress; PT: Fortaleza do Monte	1617–1626	Intact		Macau	China	Portugal (1617–1999)
EN: Mutrah Fort; PT: Forte de Matara	1580s	Intact		Muscat	Oman	Portugal (1580s–1650); Muscat (1650–1820); Muscat & Oman (1820–1892); Britain (1892–1970)
EN: Negombo Fort; PT: Forte de Negombo	17th century	Fragments		Negombo	Sri Lanka	Portugal (17th century–1640); Netherlands (1640–1796); Britain (1796–1948)
EN: Pallipuram Fort; PT: Forte de Paliporto	1503	Intact		Kochi	India	Portugal (1503–1663); Netherlands (1663–1795); Britain (1795–1947)
EN: Pooneryn Fort; PT: Forte de Pooneryn	17th century	Ruins		Pooneryn	Sri Lanka	Portugal (17th century-1658); Netherlands (1658–1796); Britain (1796–1948)
EN: Portuguese Fort; PT: Forte Português	17th century	Intact		Jepara Regency	Indonesia	Mataram (17th century-1743); Netherlands (1743–1811, 1814–1942); Britain (1811–1814); Japan (1942–1945)
EN: Qal'at al-Bahrain; PT: Forte de Barém	16th century	Intact		Capital Governorate	Bahrain	Portugal (16th century)
EN: Redoubt of Counselor Jacinto Cândido; PT: Reduto do Conselheiro Jacinto Candido	1655	Intact		Batugade	(Timor-Leste) East Timor	Portugal (1655–1975); Indonesia (1975–1999); UNTAET (1999–2002)
EN: Revdanda Fort; PT: Forte de Revdanda; Orig: Fortaleza de Chaul	1524	Ruins		Revdanda	India	Portugal (1524–1806); Maratha (1806–1818); Britain (1818–1947)
EN: St. Angelo Fort; PT: Forte de Santo Ângelo	1505	Intact		Kannur	India	
EN: St. Thomas Fort; PT: Forte de São Tomé	1518	Ruins		Kollam	India	Portugal (1518–1661); Netherlands (1661–1795); Britain (1795–1947)

== See also ==
- Architecture of Portugal
