= Deserto de Viana =

Sand desert on Boa Vista, Cape Verde

Coordinates: 16.14°N 22.86°W

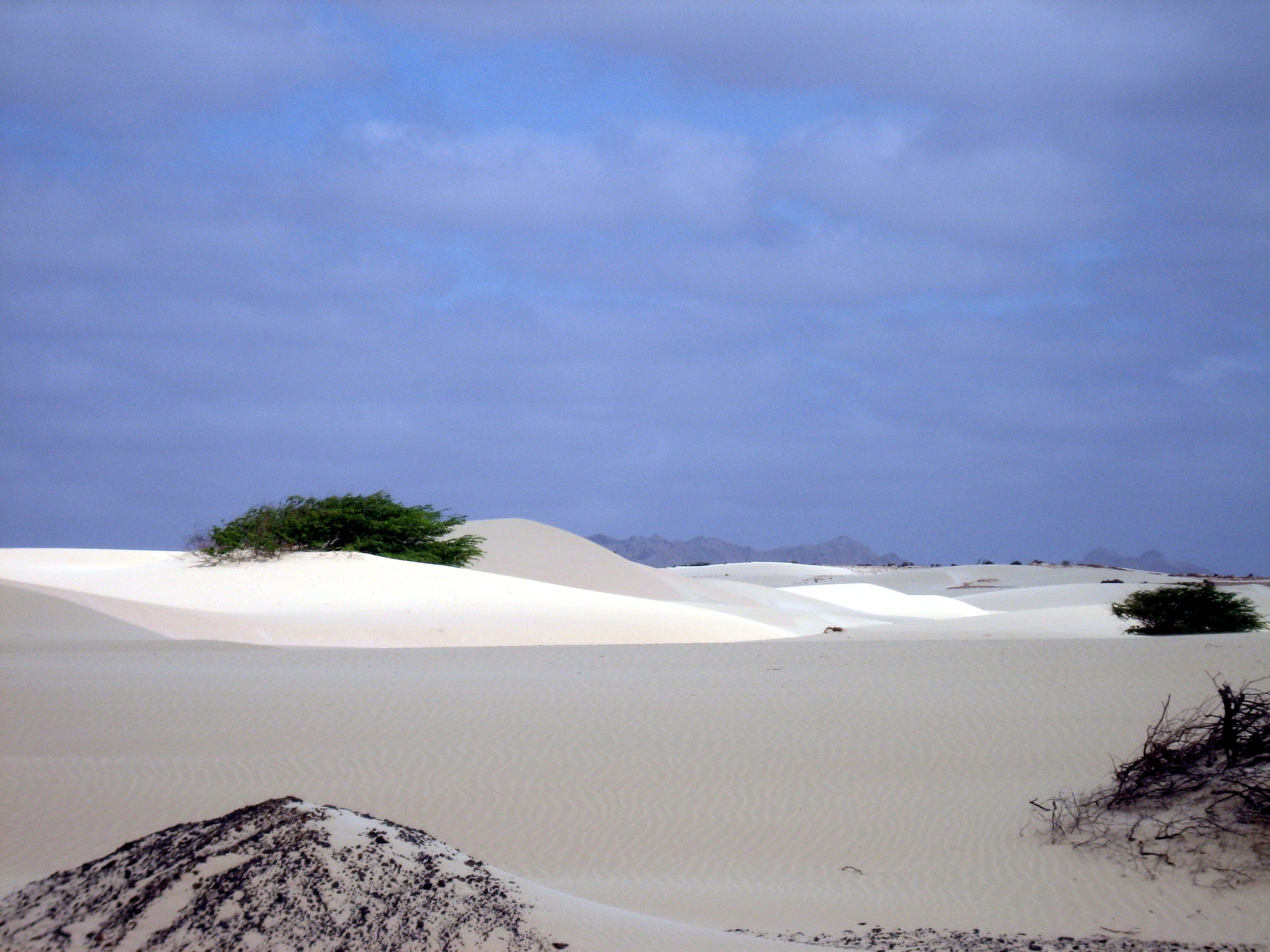
Deserto de Viana in northwestern Boa Vista Island

The Deserto de Viana is a sand desert in the northwestern part of the island of Boa Vista, Cape Verde. It is situated east of the towns Rabil and Sal Rei, and west of Bofarreira. The desert itself is not a protected area, but it is adjacent to the nature reserve Boa Esperança, which includes the Lagoa do Rabil and the Praia de Atalanta.

It is considered one of the seven natural wonders of Cape Verde.

== See also ==
- Geography of Cape Verde
- List of deserts
