= Estância de Baixo =

- Settlement
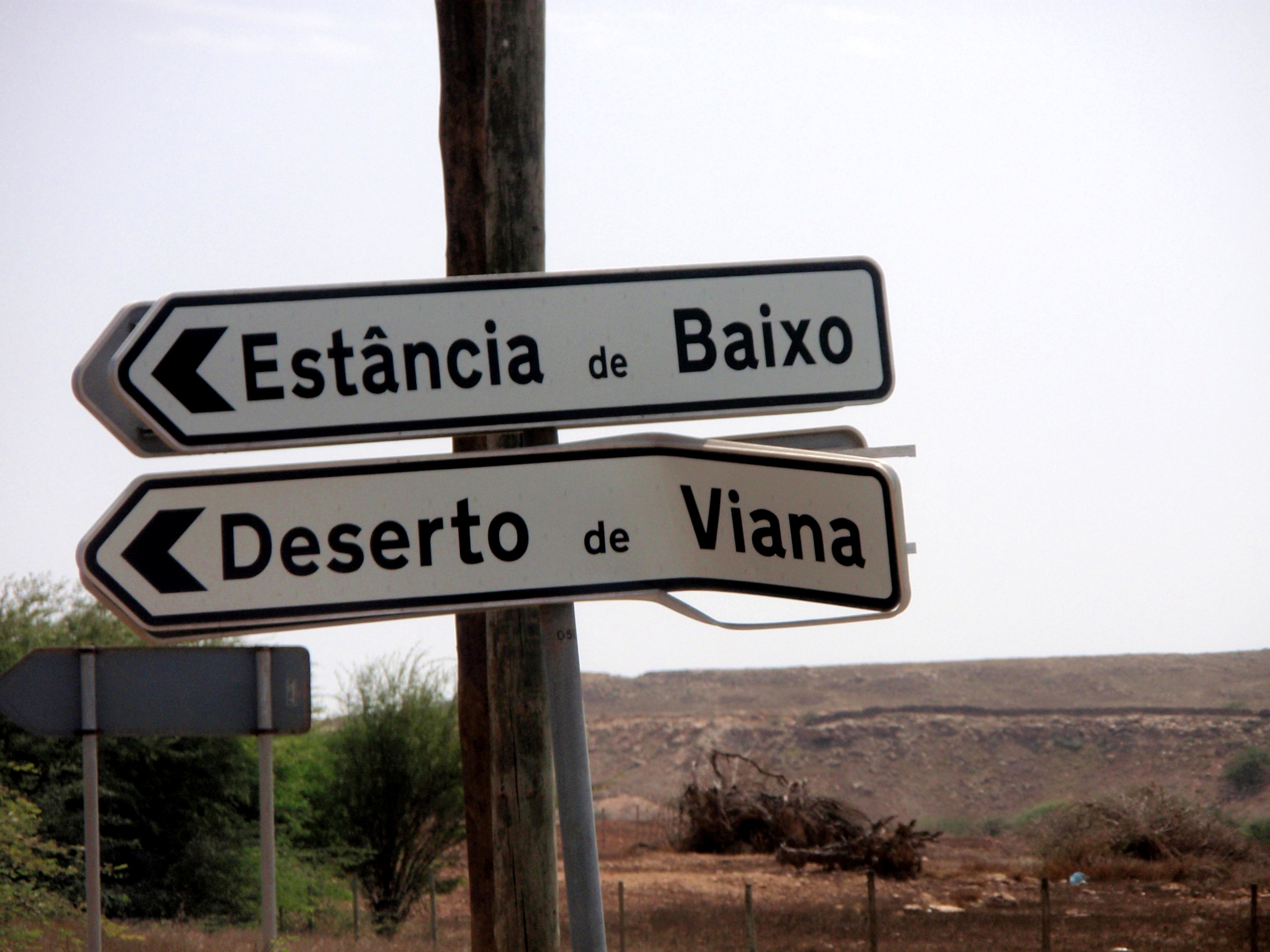

- Location within Cape Verde
- Coordinates: 16.139°N 22.875°W
- Country: Cape Verde
- Island: Boa Vista
- Municipality: Boa Vista
- Civil parish: Santa Isabel

Population (2010)
  - Total: 578
- ID: 51202

Estância de Baixo is a settlement in the western part of the island of Boa Vista, Cape Verde. Its population was 578 in 2010, making it the island's third most populated place. The village is around 6 km southeast of the island capital of Sal Rei, west of the Deserto de Viana, on the eastern bank of Ribeira do Rabil.

== See also ==
- List of villages and settlements in Cape Verde
