= Ilhéu Derrubado =

Uninhabited islet in Cape Verde

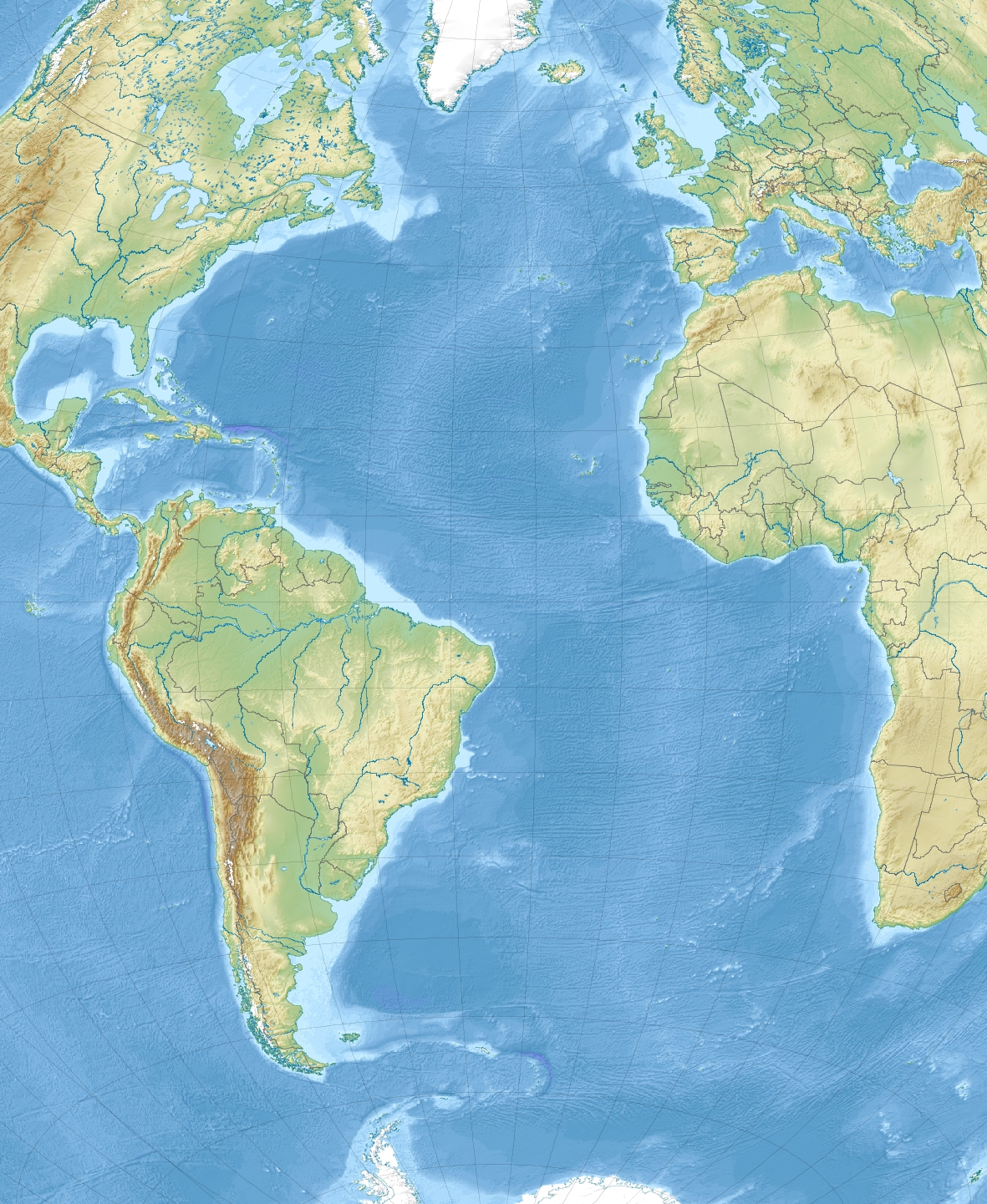
- Location within Cape Verde Location within Atlantic Ocean

Geography
- Location: Atlantic Ocean
- Coordinates: 16.2263°N 22.798°W
- Archipelago: Cape Verde

Administration
- Cape Verde
- Concelhos (Municipalities): Boa Vista

Ilhéu Derrubado is a small uninhabited islet about 300 m (980 ft) off the north coast of the island of Boa Vista, Cape Verde. It is part of the protected area Parque Natural do Norte. Derrubado is also the name of the coastal area near the islet. The nearest settlement is Bofarreira, 5 km (3.1 mi) to the southwest.
