= Rabil =

- Settlement
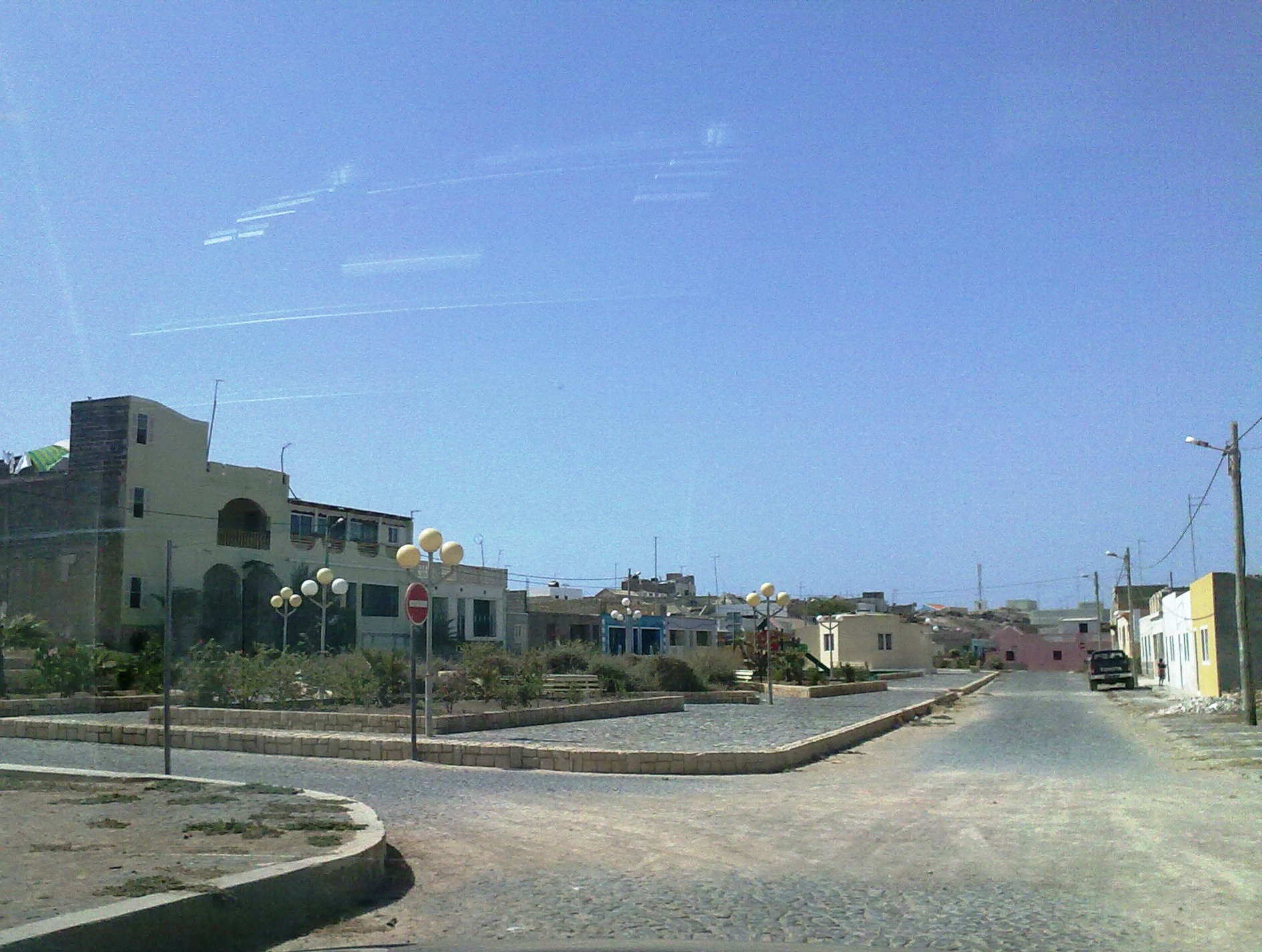

- Location within Cape Verde
- Coordinates: 16.129°N 22.887°W
- Country: Cape Verde
- Island: Boa Vista
- Municipality: Boa Vista
- Civil parish: Santa Isabel
- Elevation: 37 m (121 ft)

Population (2010)
  - Total: 1,248
- Postal code: 5110, 5111
- ID: 51204

Rabil is a town on the island of Boa Vista, Cape Verde. It was the island's former capital. Rabil is the island's second largest town, located 6 kilometres (3.7 mi) southeast of the island capital of Sal Rei. Its population was 1,248 in 2010. The island's airport, Aristides Pereira International Airport, is situated northwest of the town.

== Geography ==
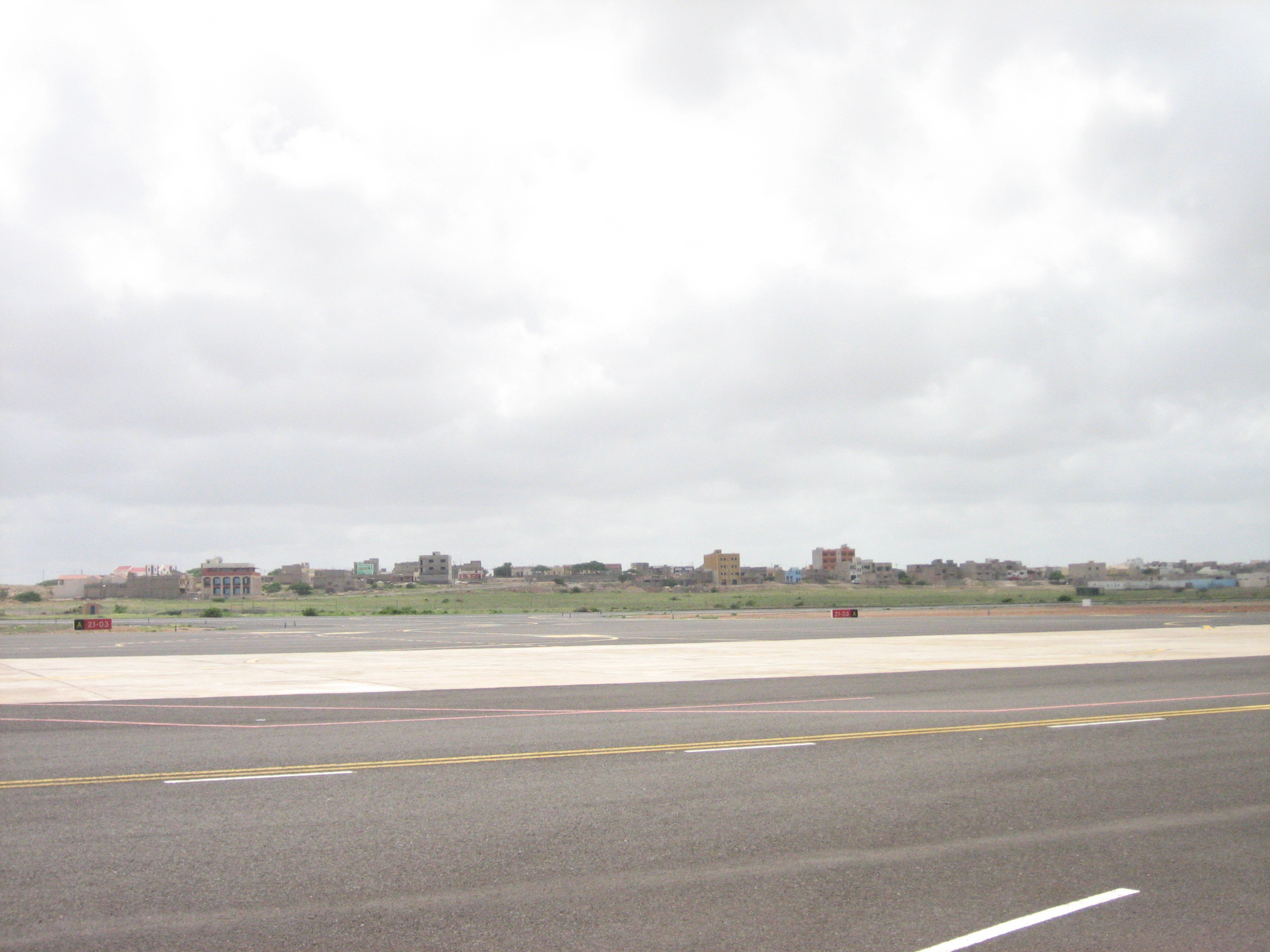
View of Rabil from the airport

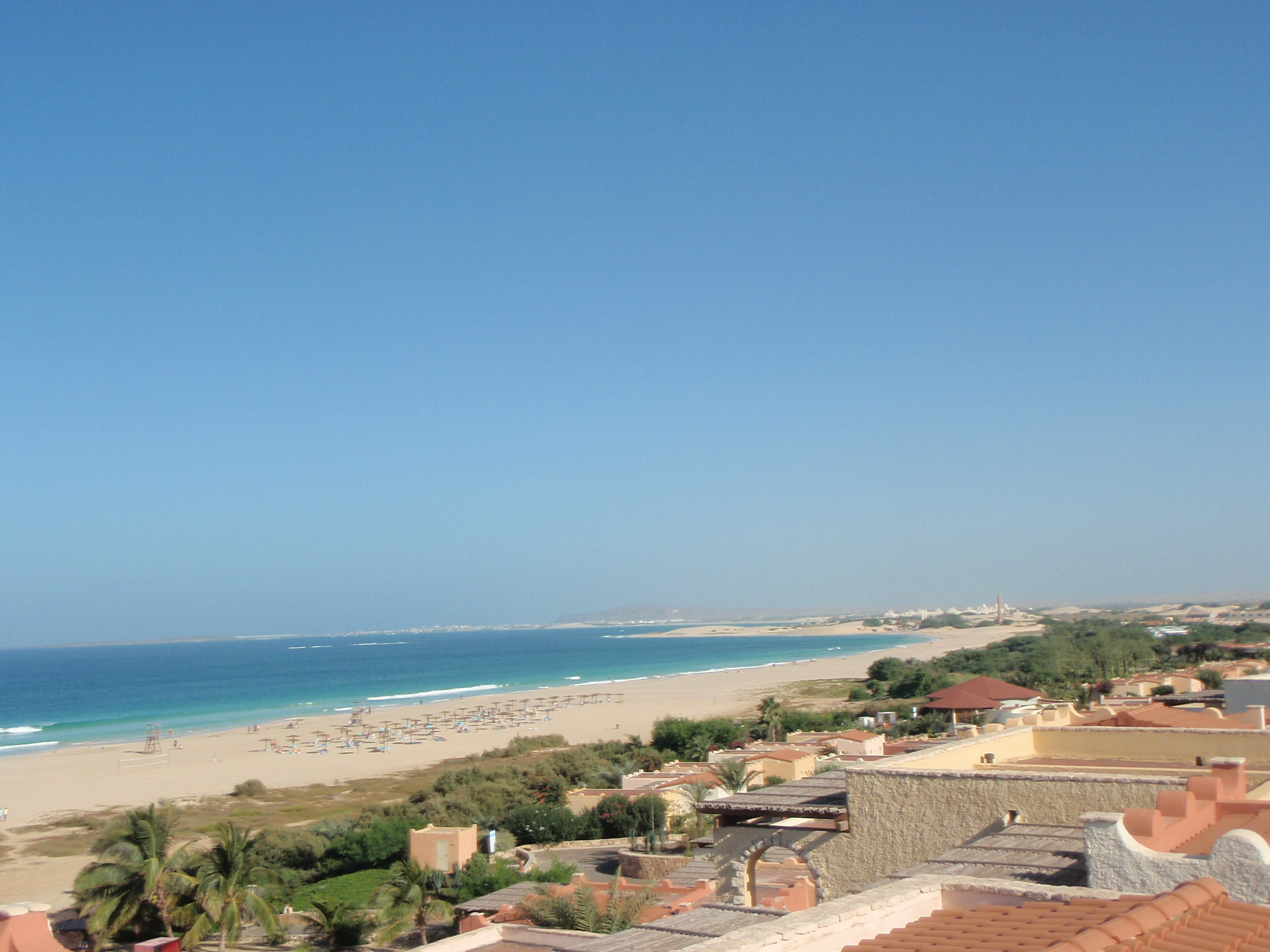
Praia de Chaves with its hotels and resorts in Rabil's west end

The river Ribeira do Rabil flows past the town. The wetlands around its mouth are an Important Bird Area. The beach Praia da Chave has been developed for tourism.

== See also ==
- List of cities and towns in Cape Verde
- Tourism in Cape Verde
