= Santa Isabel (Boa Vista) =

- Civil parish
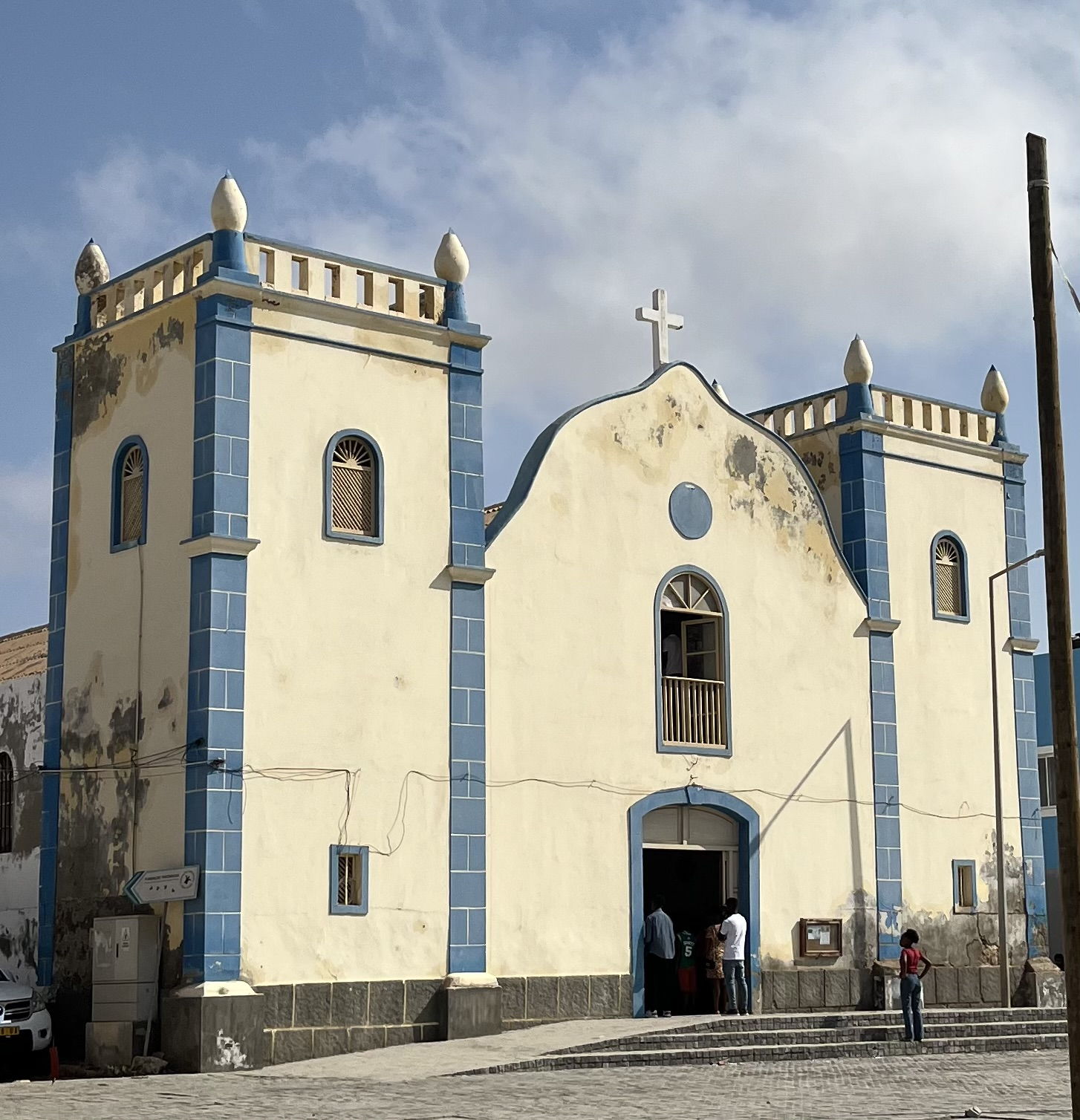
- Santa Isabel parish church at Boa Vista

- Location within Cape Verde
- Coordinates: 16.09°N 22.87°W
- Country: Cape Verde
- Island: Boa Vista
- Municipality: Boa Vista

Population (2010)
  - Total: 8,059
- ID: 512

Santa Isabel (Portuguese meaning "Saint Elizabeth") is a freguesia (civil parish) of Cape Verde. It covers the western part of the island of Boa Vista, and contains the island's capital Sal Rei. The freguesia consists of the following settlements:

- Bofarreira
- Estância de Baixo
- Povoação Velha
- Rabil (town)
- Sal Rei (city)

It is also an eponymous parish church in the city of Sal Rei.

== Sources ==
- Website of Diocese Mindelo, archived
