= Bofarreira =

- Settlement
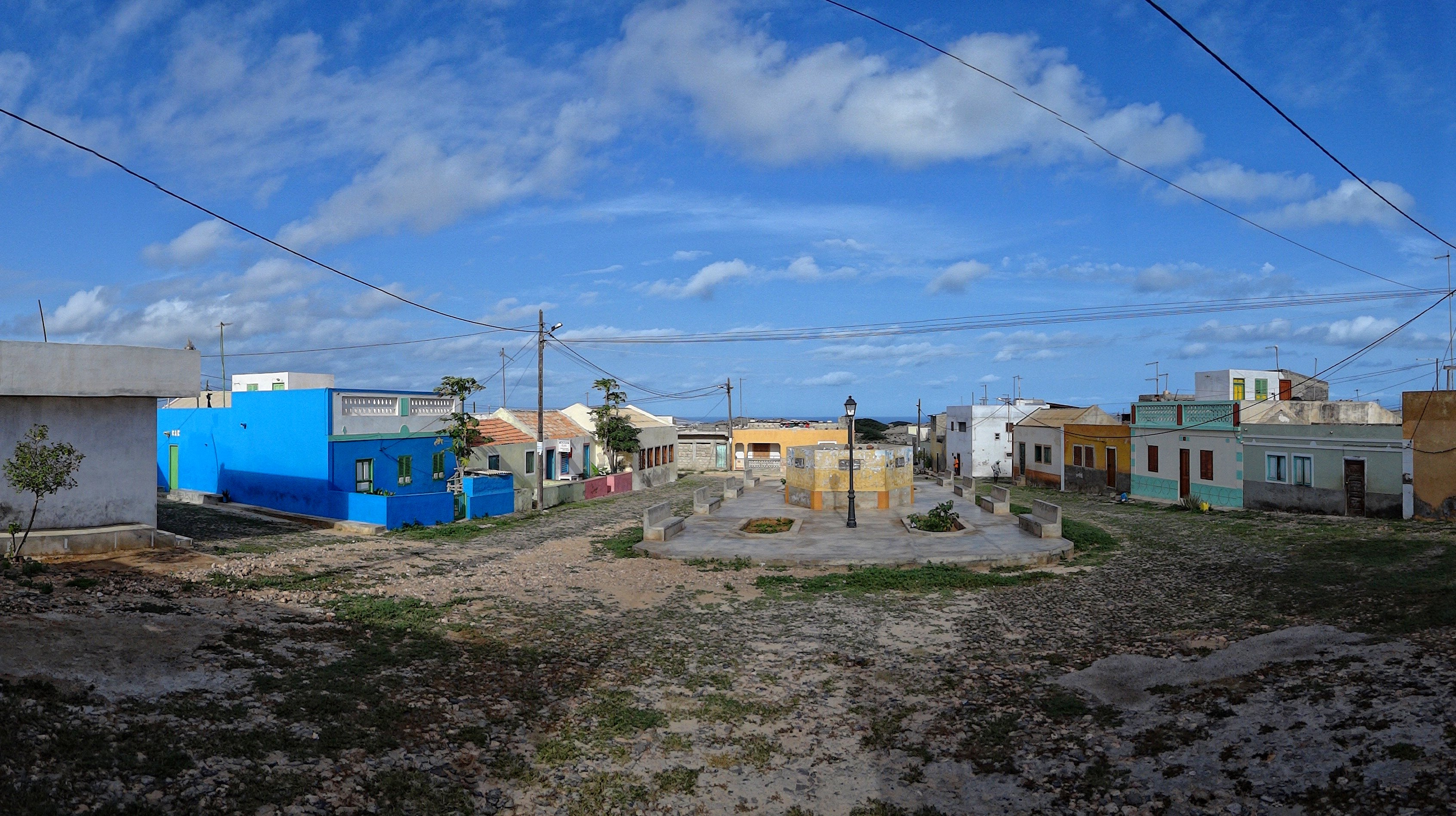
- Village square

- Location within Cape Verde
- Coordinates: 16.185°N 22.823°W
- Country: Cape Verde
- Island: Boa Vista
- Municipality: Boa Vista
- Civil parish: Santa Isabel
- Elevation: 128 m (420 ft)

Population (2010)
  - Total: 144
- ID: 51201

Bofarreira is a village in the northern part of the island of Boa Vista in the Cape Verde archipelago. The village is around 10 km east of the island capital of Sal Rei.

== Gallery ==
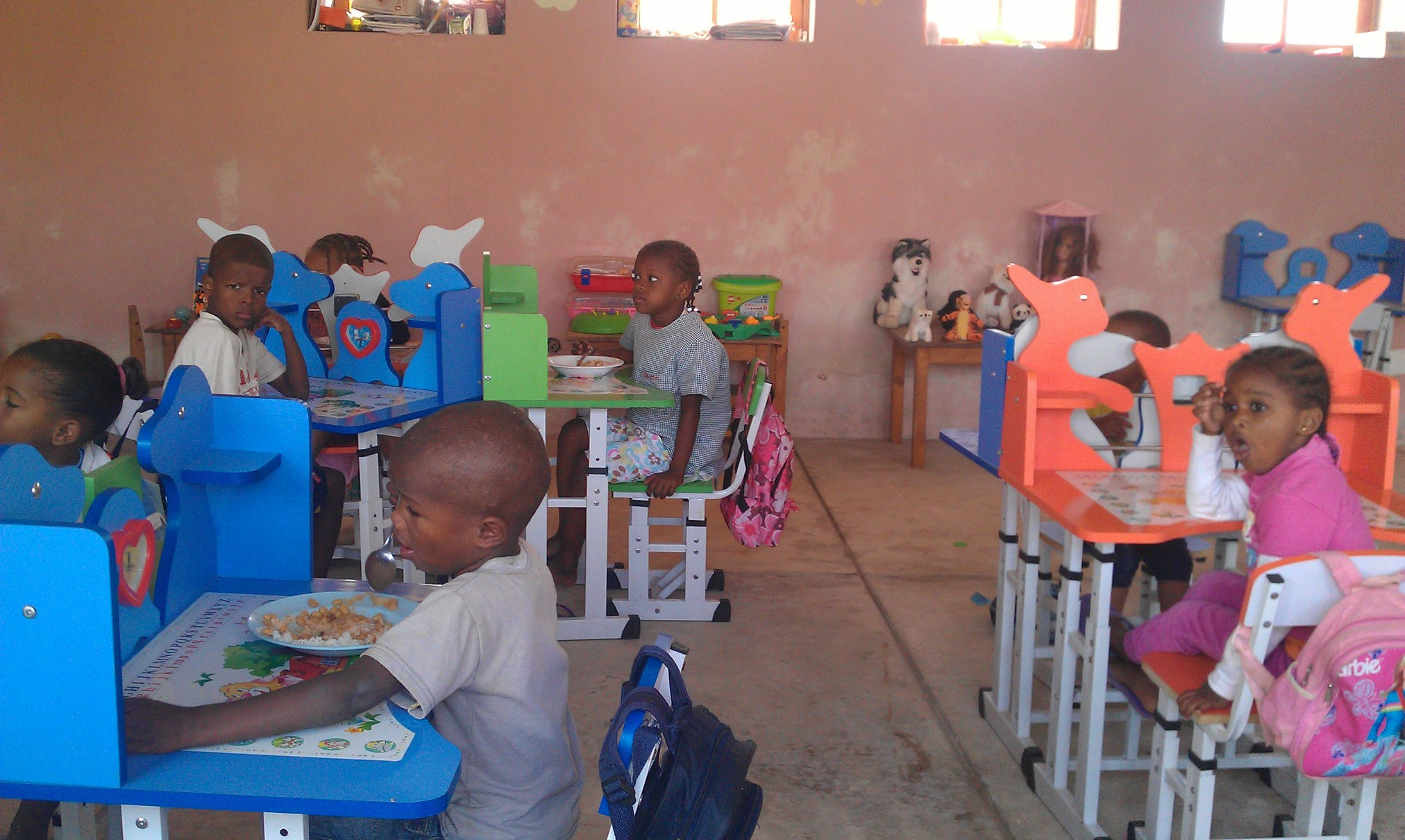
Village school (2012)

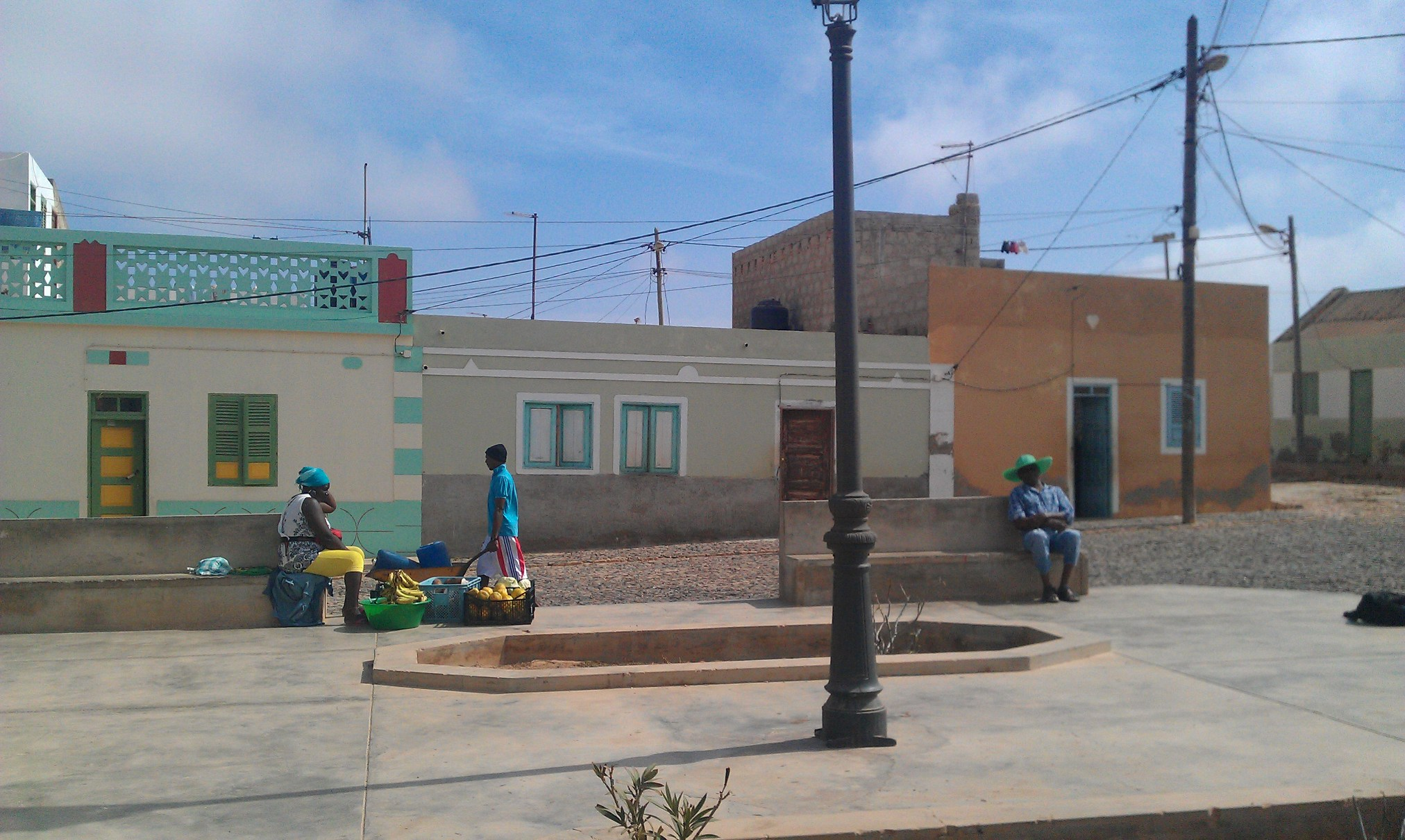
Village square (2012)

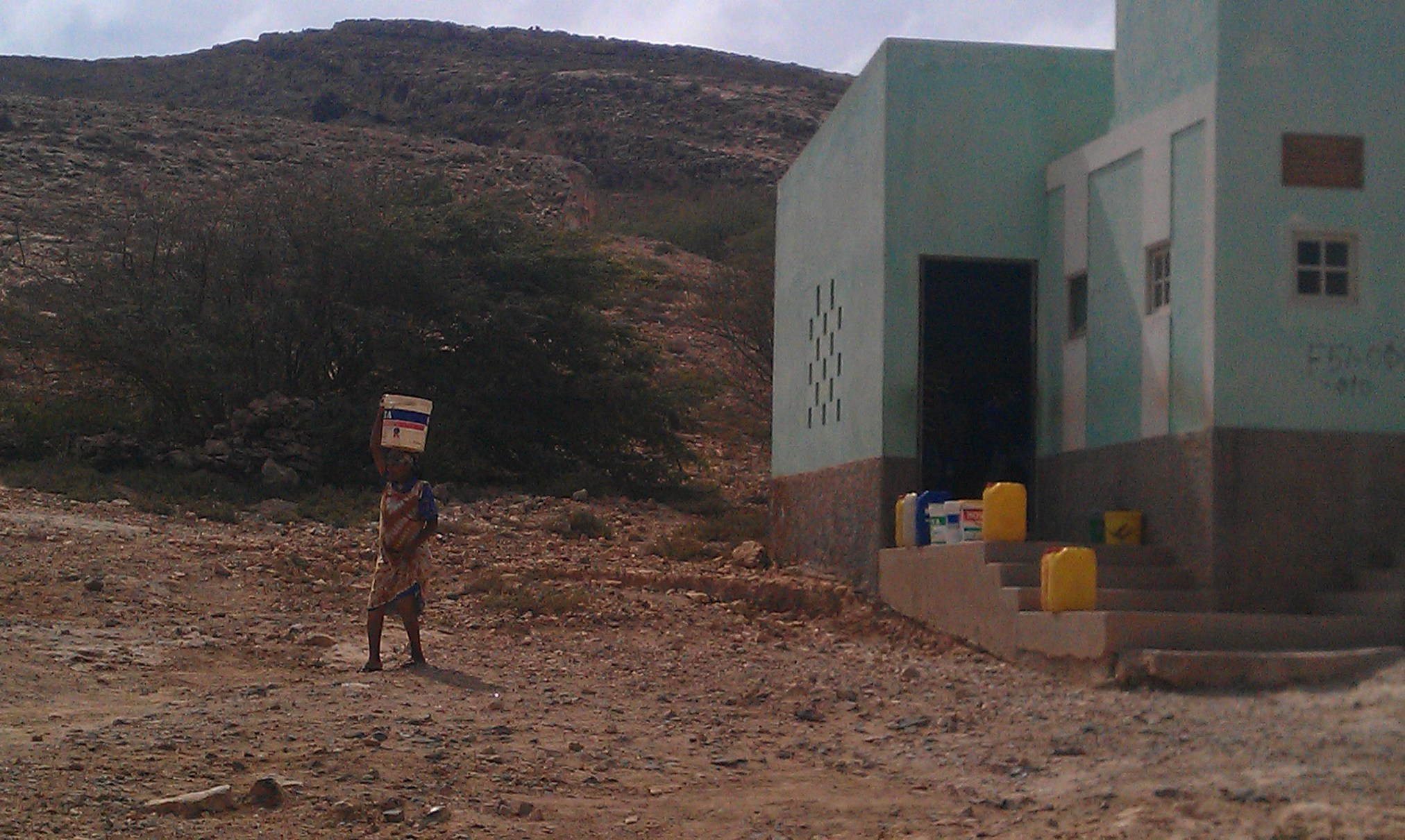
Local resident of Bofarreira (2012)

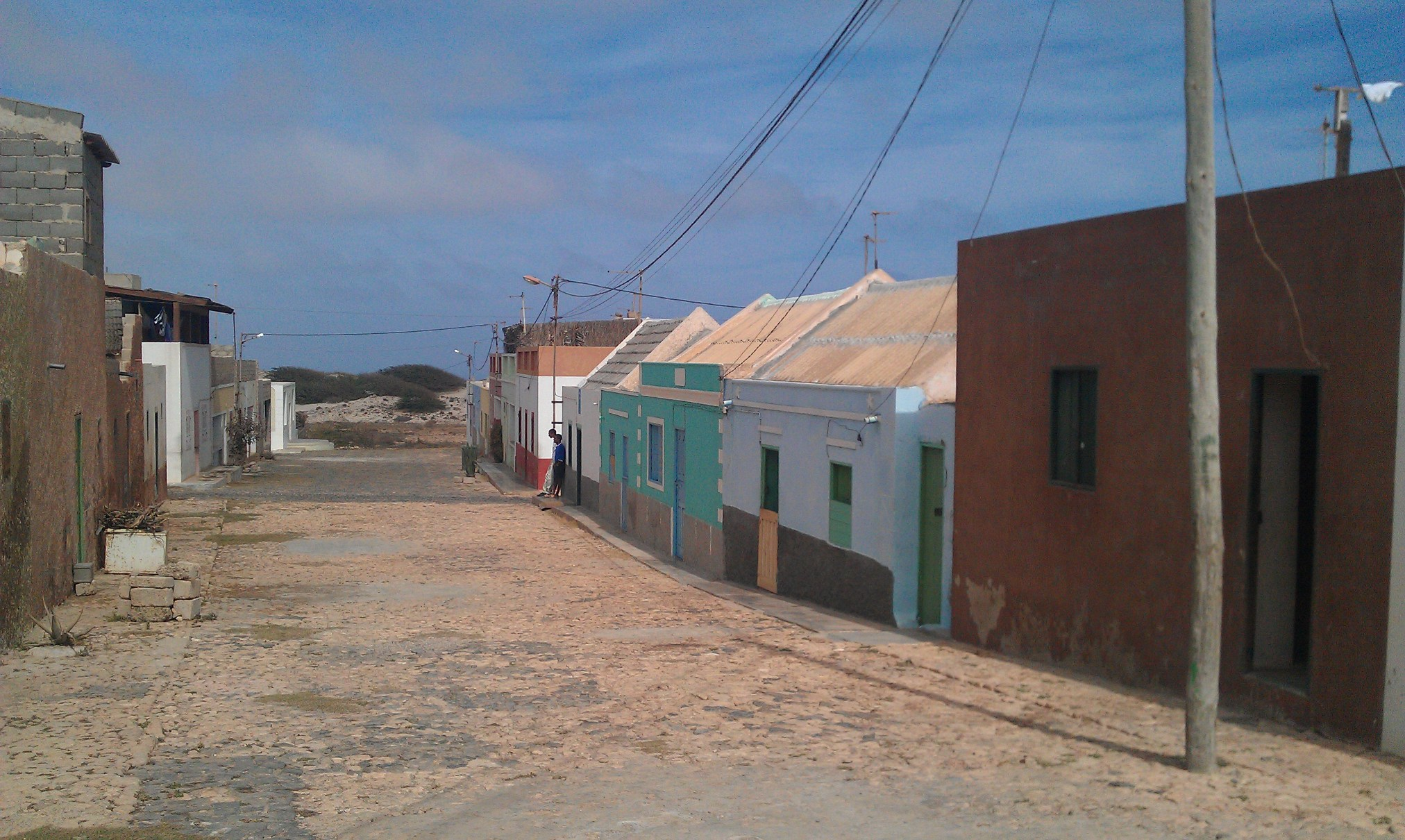
Main street of Bofarreira (2012)

== See also ==
- List of villages and settlements in Cape Verde
