= Ribeira do Rabil =

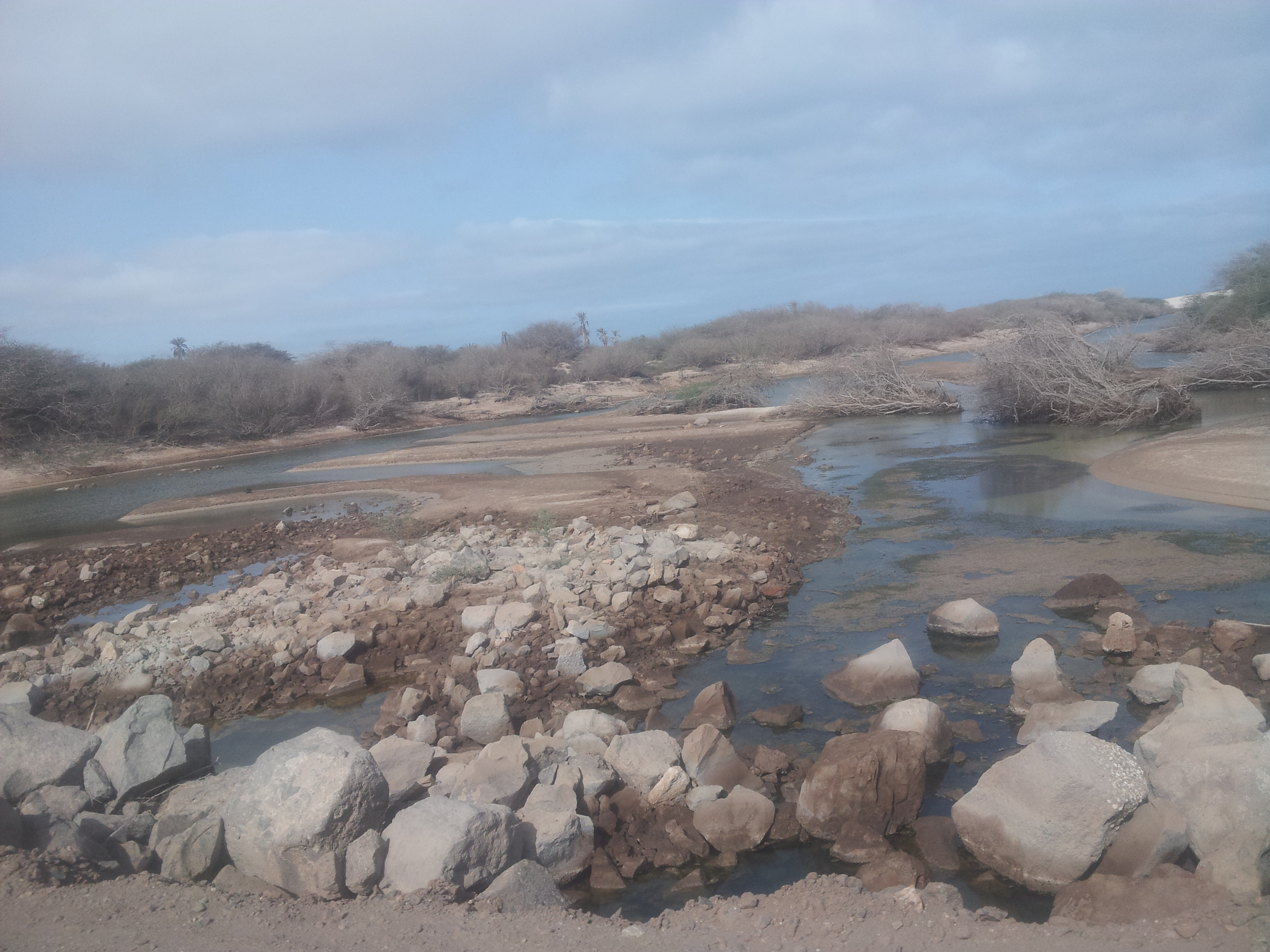

Location
- Country: Cape Verde

Physical characteristics
- Source
  - location: Monte Estância, Boa Vista
- Mouth
  - location: Atlantic Ocean
  - coordinates: 16.0827°N 22.8469°W
- Length: 27 km (17 mi)
- Basin size: 199 km^{2} (77 sq mi)

Ribeira do Rabil is a seasonal stream in the central and western part of the island of Boa Vista in Cape Verde. It is 27 km (17 mi) long, and its basin area is 199 km^{2} (77 sq mi). Its source is in the southeastern part of the island, north of the island's highest point Monte Estância. It flows generally northwest, passes east of the town Rabil and flows into the Atlantic Ocean near the Aristides Pereira International Airport. The estuary, Lagoa do Rabil, is an important wetland area.

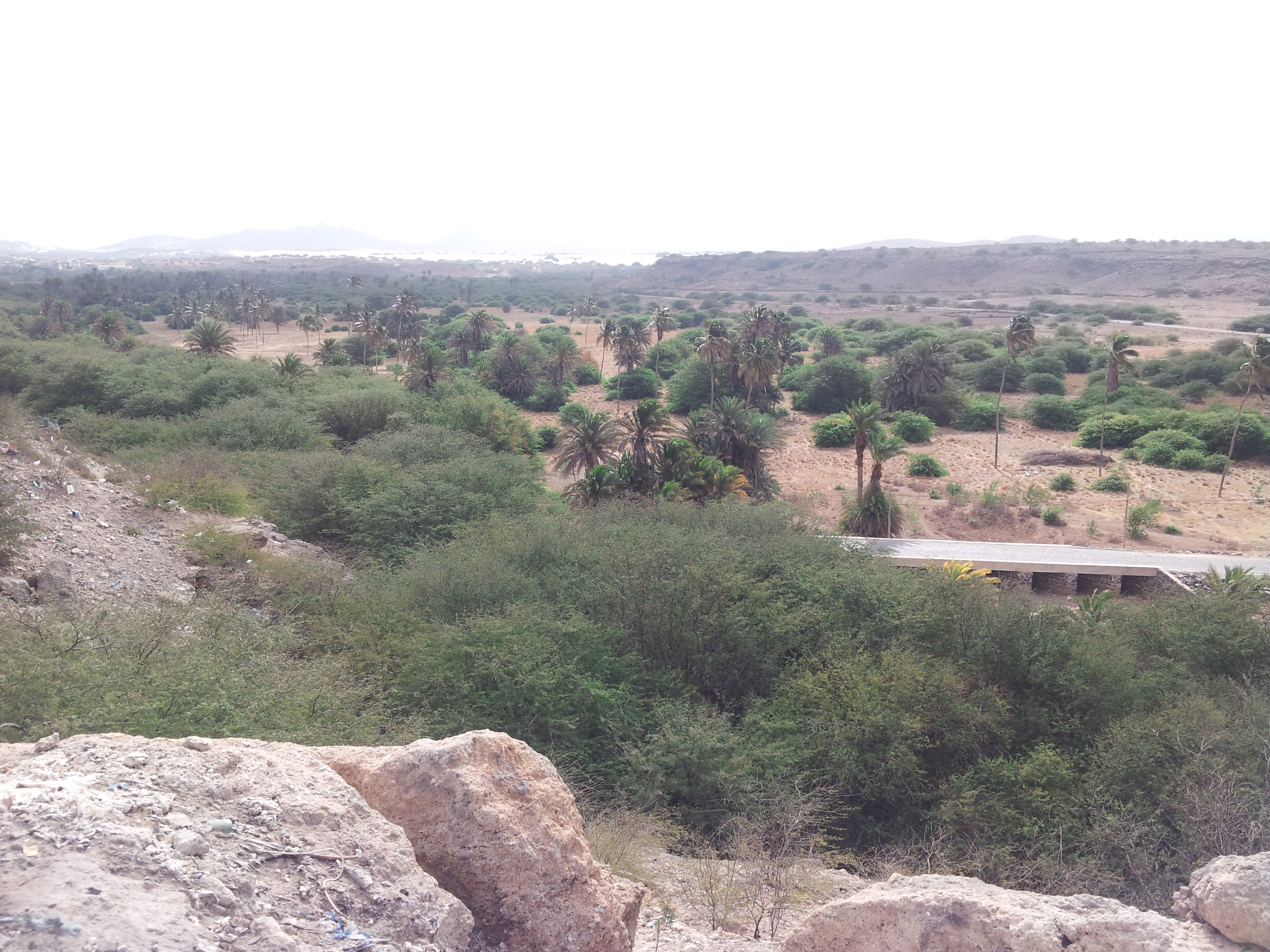
Palm trees along Ribeira do Rabil

== See also ==
- List of streams in Cape Verde
