= Ilhéu de Sal Rei =

Islet in Cape Verde

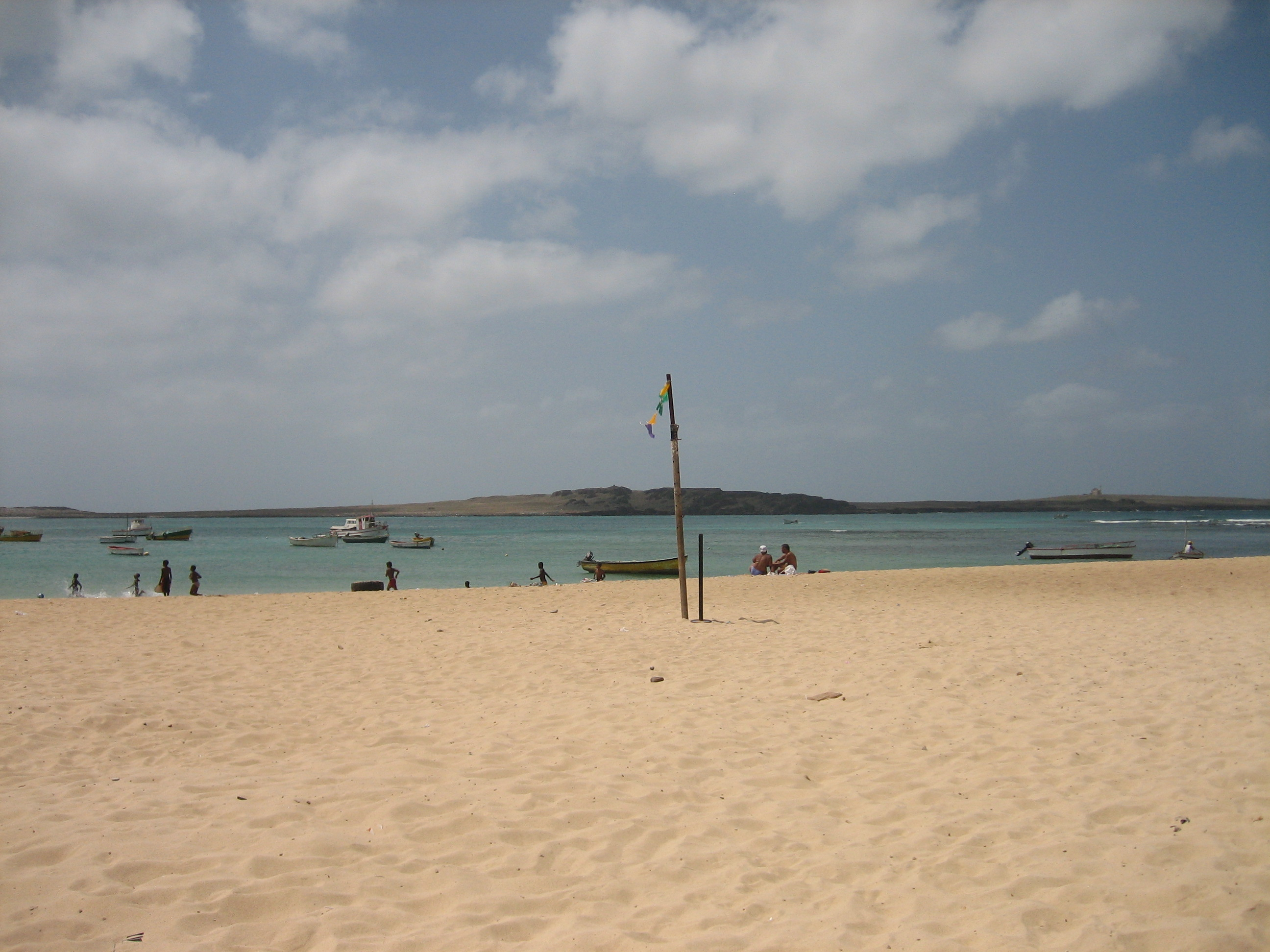
- Ilhéu de Sal Rei seen from Sal Rei, Boa Vista

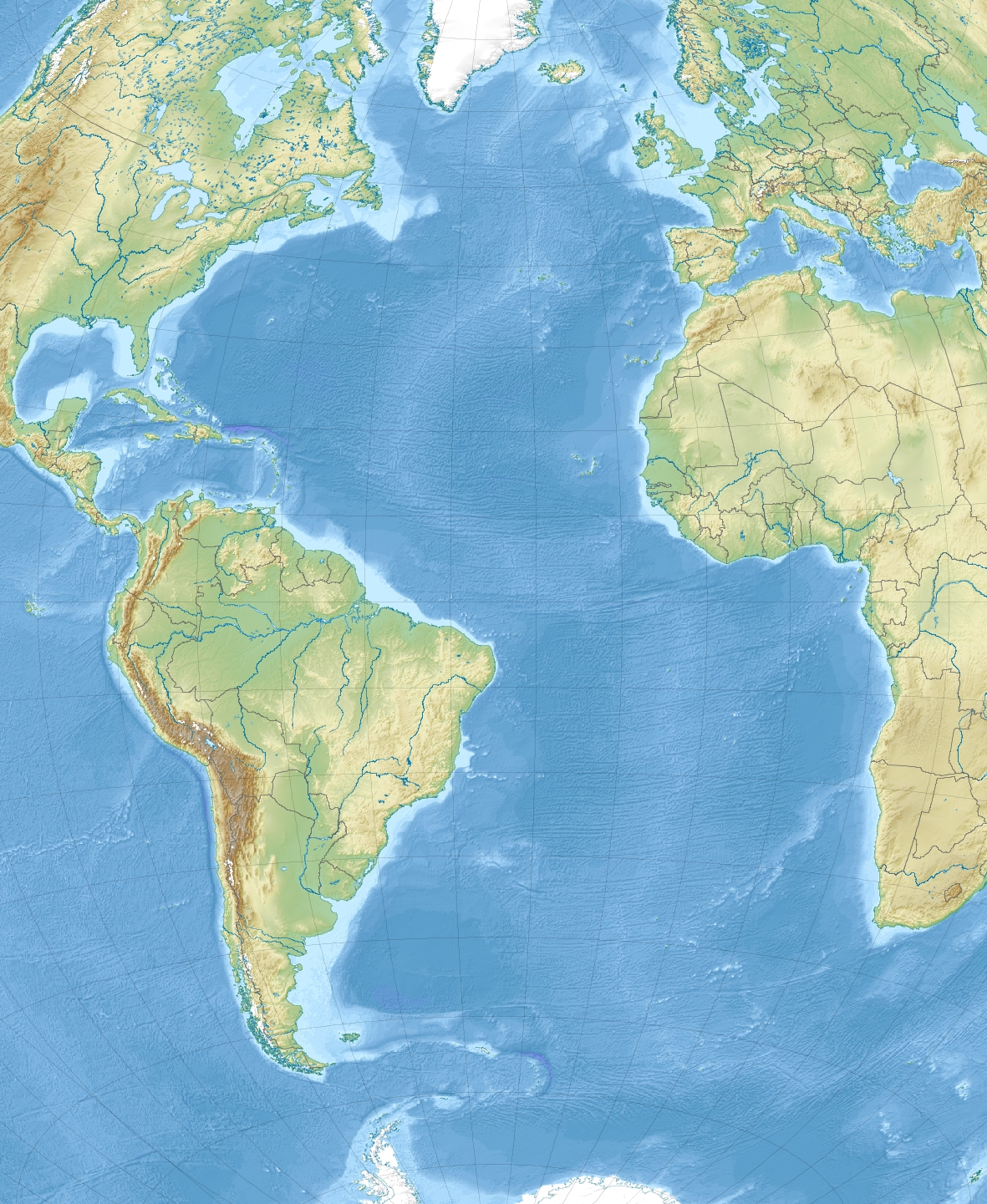
- Location within Cape Verde Location within Atlantic Ocean

Geography
- Location: Atlantic Ocean
- Coordinates: 16.171°N 22.930°W
- Area: 0.89 km^{2} (0.34 sq mi)
- Highest elevation: 27 m (89 ft)

Administration
- Cape Verde
- Municipality: Boa Vista

Demographics
- Population: 0

Ilhéu de Sal Rei is an uninhabited islet near the coast of Boa Vista Island, Cape Verde. It is located 1 km (0.6 miles) southwest of the island capital Sal Rei. Its area is 89 ha (0.34 sq mi) and its highest point is 27 m (88.6 ft).

The islet has exposed basaltic and limestone rock, and there are sandy beaches in sheltered areas. The entire islet is a natural monument. The headland Ponta de Escuma is the islet's westernmost point. A narrow strait to its northeast separates it from Boa Vista island by 500 to 600 meters. On the southern tip of the island, the ruined Portuguese fort Duque de Bragança is situated.

== Ponta da Escuma Lighthouse ==
Ponta da Escuma Lighthouse
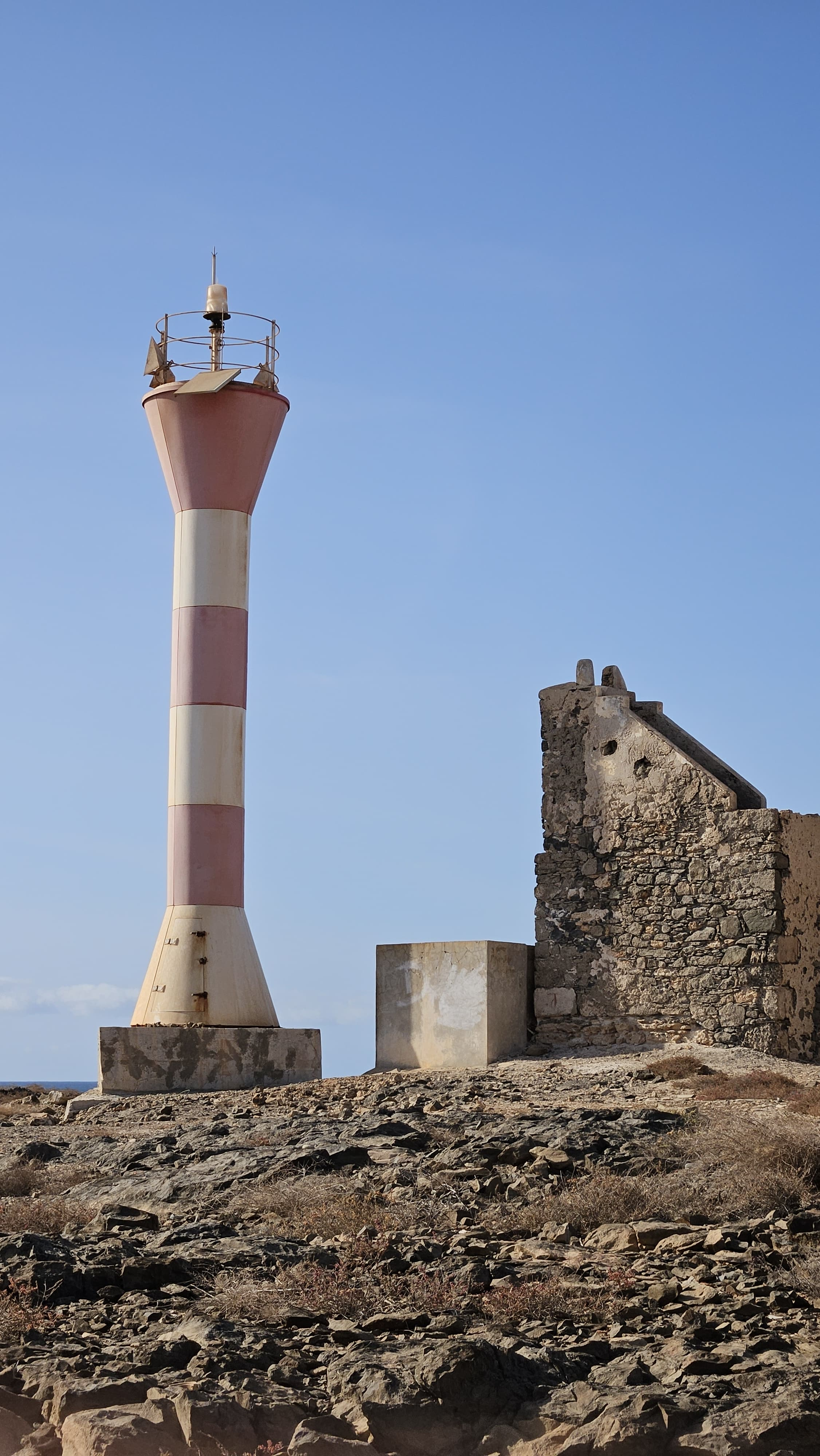
- Location: Ilhéu de Sal Rei, Ilhéu de Sal Rei, Sal Rei, Cape Verde
- Coordinates: 16°10′21″N 22°55′55″W

Tower
- Constructed: 1888 (first)
- Foundation: concrete base
- Construction: metal lamp post
- Height: 7.9 metres (26 ft)
- Shape: cylindrical lamp post with light
- Power source: solar power

Light
- First lit: n/a (current)
- Focal height: 28 metres (92 ft)
- Range: 11 nautical miles (20 km; 13 mi)
- Characteristic: Fl(5) WR 20s
- Cape Verde no.: PT-2106

The island has a lighthouse named Ponta de Escuma, built in 1888, consisted of a concrete staircase 5 metres (16 ft) high with the light on the top. The current light is a cylindrical metal mast 7.9 metres (26 ft) high with balcony and lantern. According to the NGA the light is still active, has a solar power unit and emits five flashes white or red depending from the direction in a twenty seconds period visible up to 11 nautical miles.

== Gallery ==
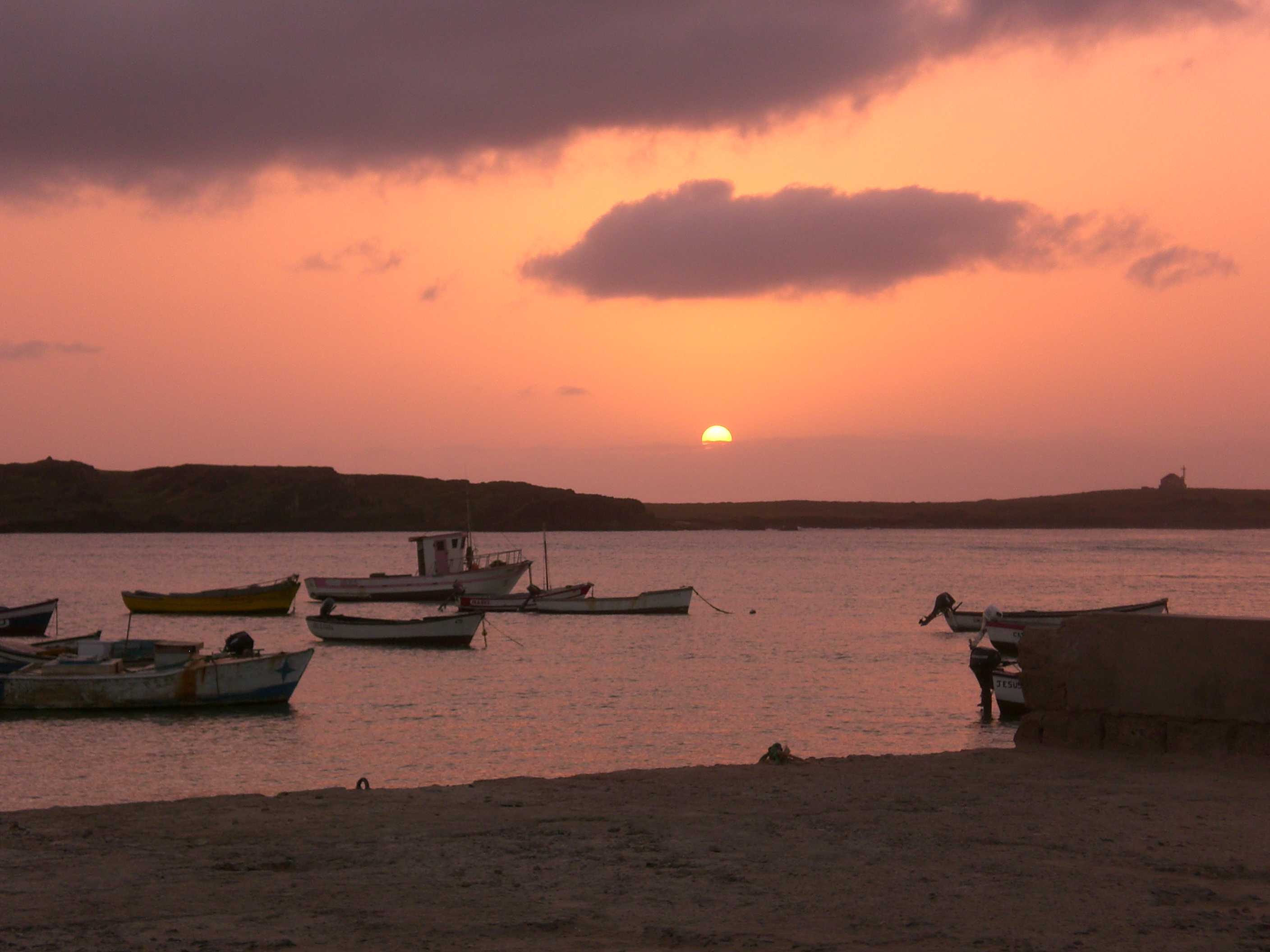
Sunset near the Sal Rei Islet

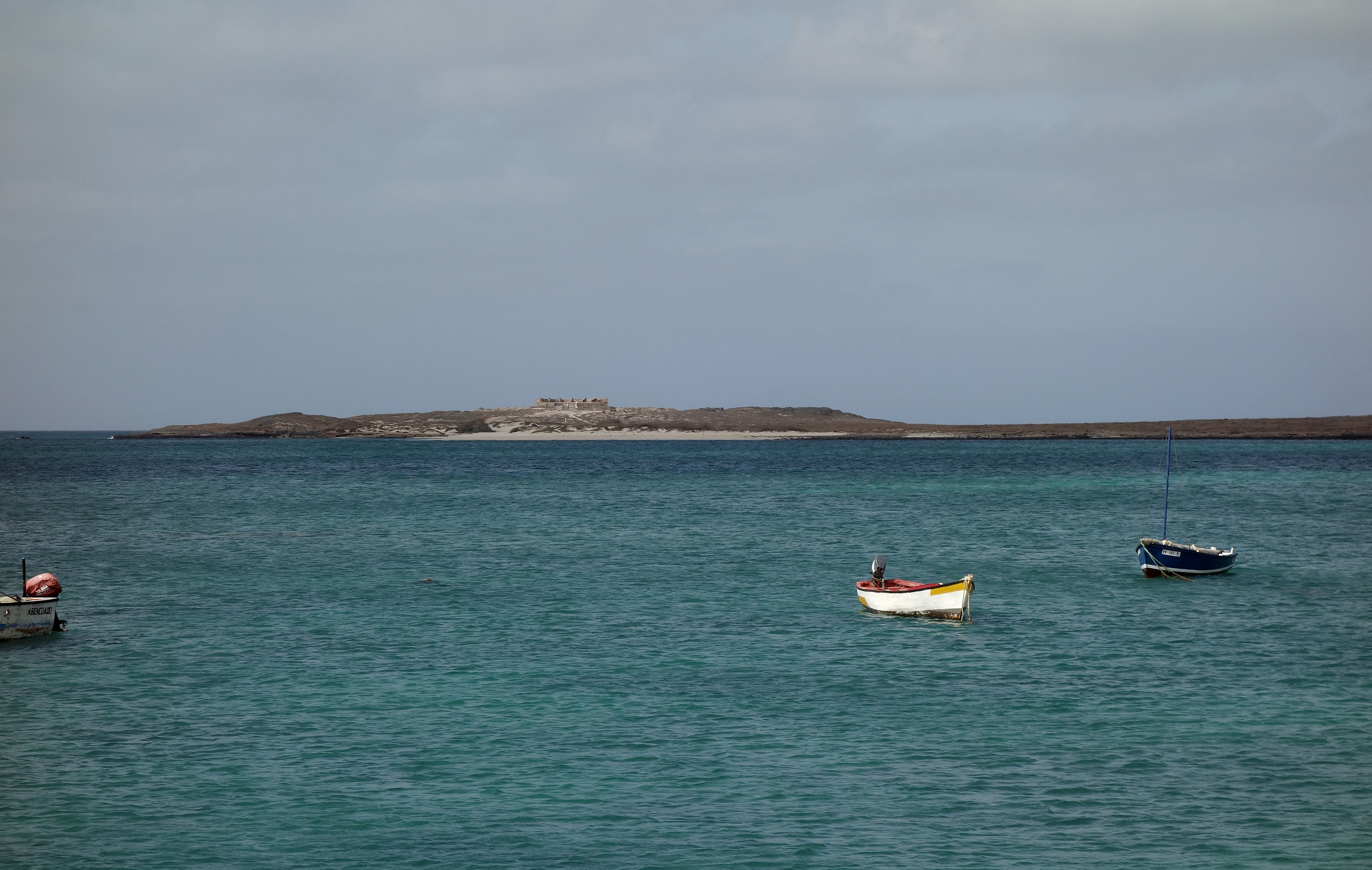

== See also ==
- List of lighthouses in Cape Verde
