= Lagoa do Rabil =

Wetland in Cape Verde

Coordinates: 16°09′N 22°54′W

Designations

Ramsar Wetland
- Official name: Lagoa de Rabil
- Designated: 18 July 2005
- Reference no.: 1576

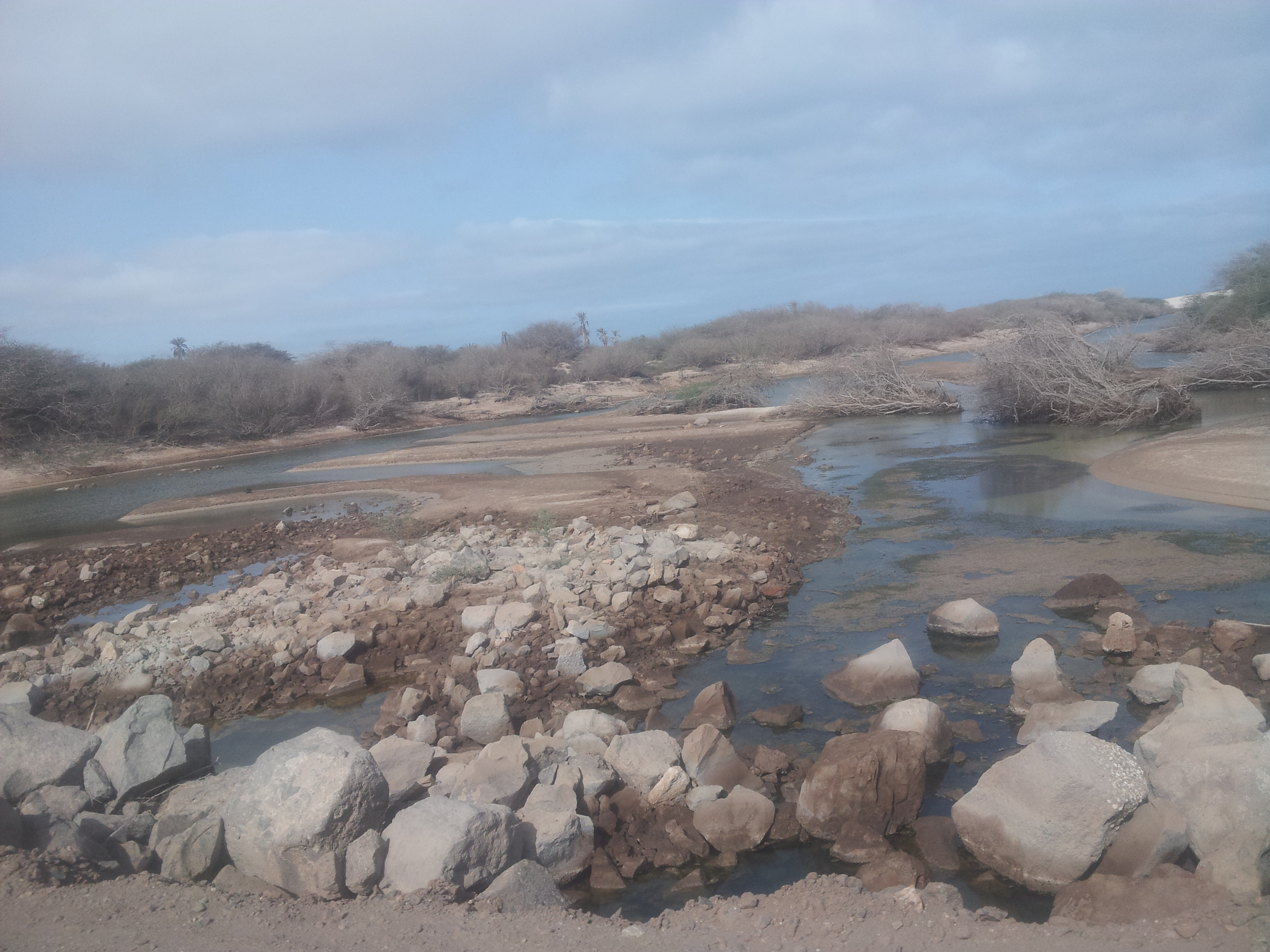
Ribeira do Rabil

The Lagoa do Rabil (Rabil lagoon) is a wetland site in the Cape Verde archipelago, on the island of Boa Vista. It has been recognised as a wetland of international importance by designation under the Ramsar Convention since 2005. The site lies at the mouth of the seasonally flowing Ribeira do Rabil, near the town of Rabil on the west coast of Boa Vista. The site comprises the river mouth, the associated lagoon, the surrounding dunes system and its vegetation dominated by Tamarix, Cyperus, Zygophyllum and Euphorbia species. The site supports a population of Iago sparrows and several species of waders, including Eurasian spoonbill. The endemic lizards Hemidactylus bouvieri and Chioninia stangeri are present.
