= Fortaleza de Nossa Senhora da Conceição =

- Rio de Janeiro, Rio de Janeiro in Brazil
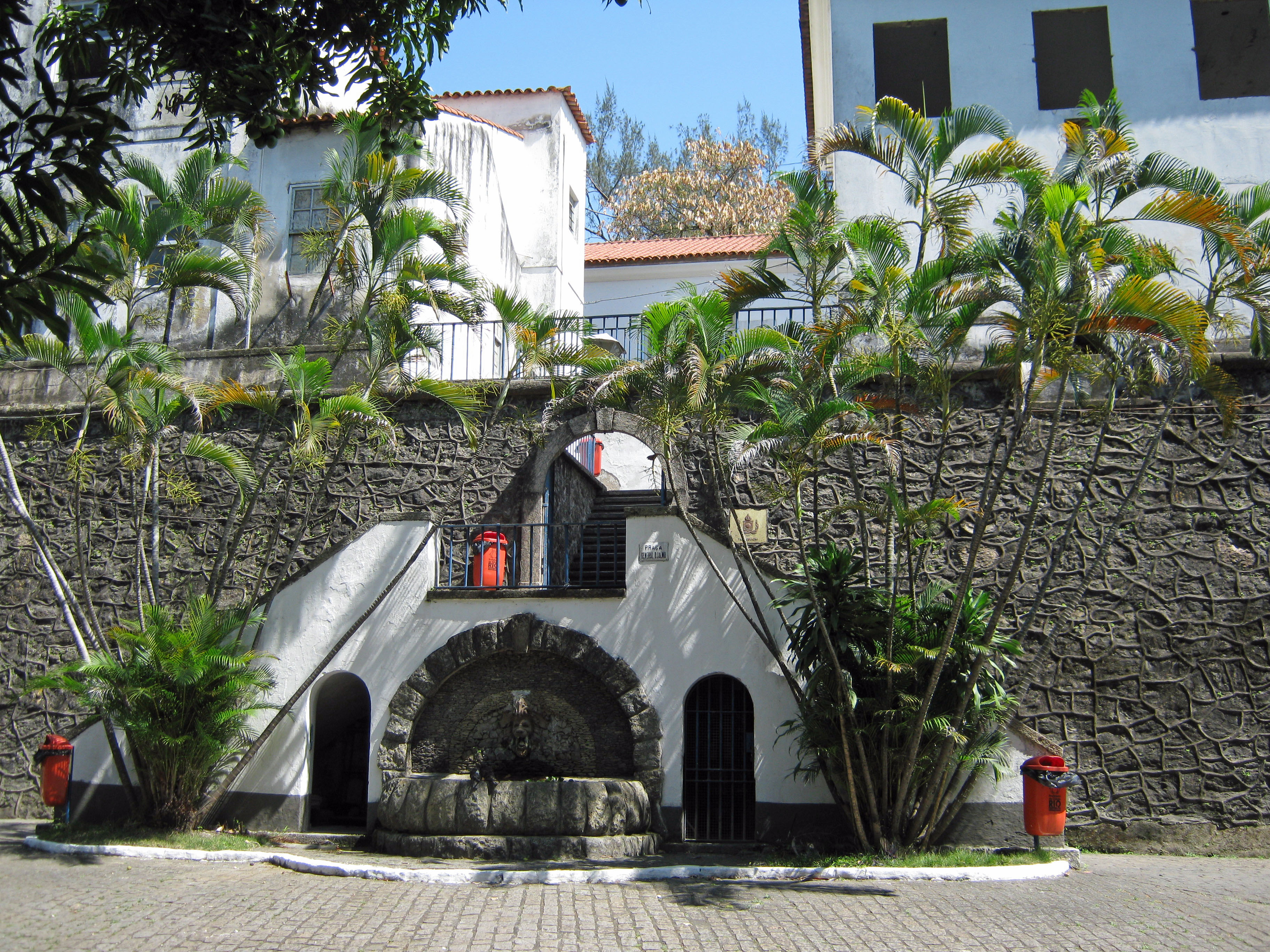

Site information
- Type: Fort

Location
- Location of Fortaleza da Conceição in Brazil
- Coordinates: 22.899608°S 43.182642°W

Fortaleza de Nossa Senhora da Conceição is a fort located in Rio de Janeiro, Brazil.

== See also ==
- History of Rio de Janeiro
