= Forte Duque de Bragança =

Fort in Cape Verde

- Ilhéu de Sal Rei near Sal Rei in Cape Verde
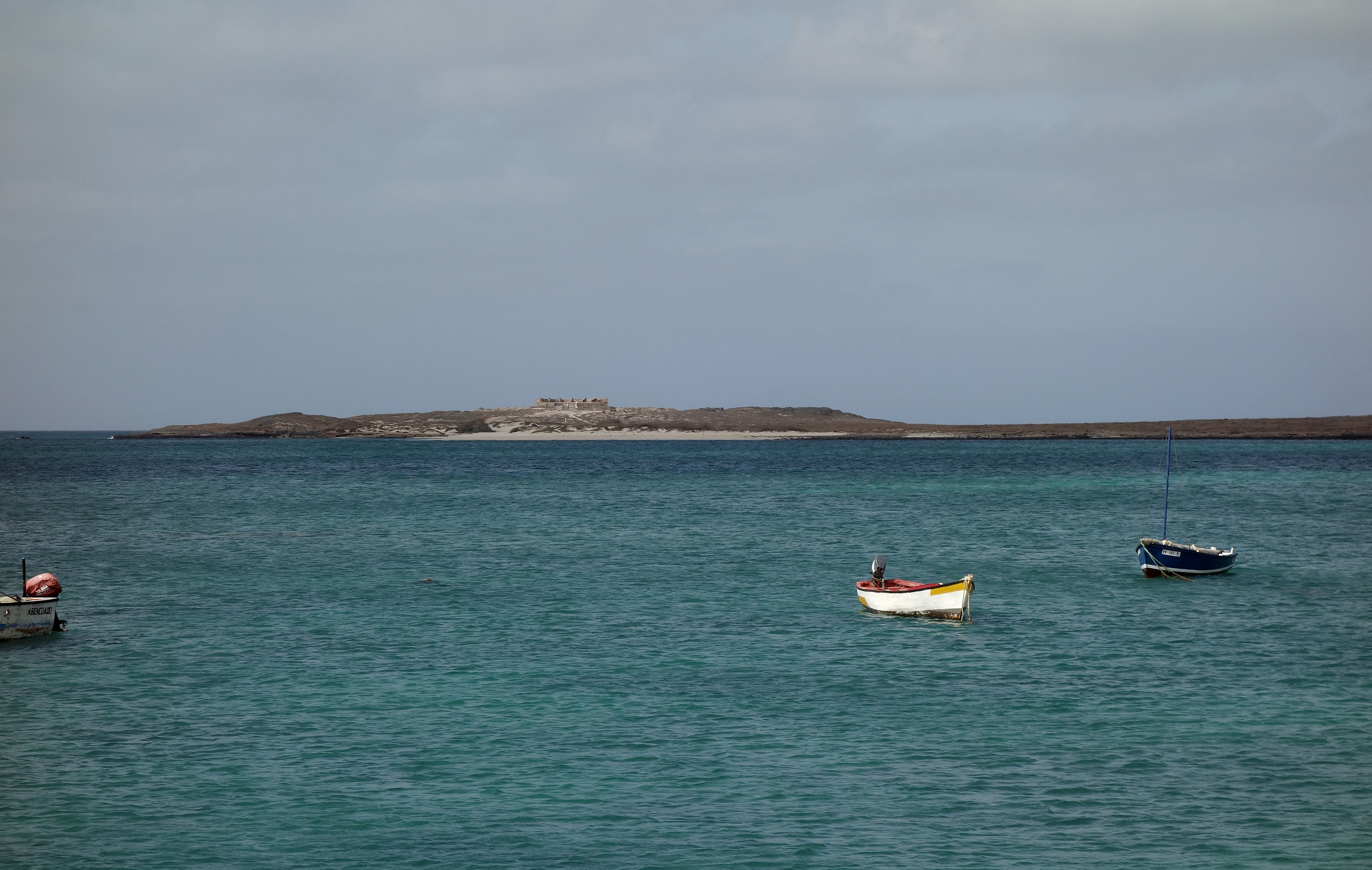

Site information
- Controlled by: Portuguese Empire
- Open to the public: No
- Condition: Ruined

Location
- Coordinates: 16.1647°N 22.9250°W

Site history
- Built: 1818

Forte Duque de Bragança is a ruined fort located on the islet Ilhéu de Sal Rei off the northwestern coast of the island of Boa Vista, Cape Verde. The fort was named after the Duke of Bragança. The fort overlooks a stretch of coast where the anchorage required defending from piracy and coastal raiding, which were common in the Atlantic Ocean at the time. The island produced salt, which attracted international trade and wealth. It was sacked in 1815 and 1817; this led to the construction of a fort in 1818. Today in ruins, the fort has been partly excavated archaeologically by the University of Cambridge.

== See also ==
- Portuguese Empire
