= Islet of Saint Lawrence =

Coordinates: 15°3′2″S 40°43′34.7″E

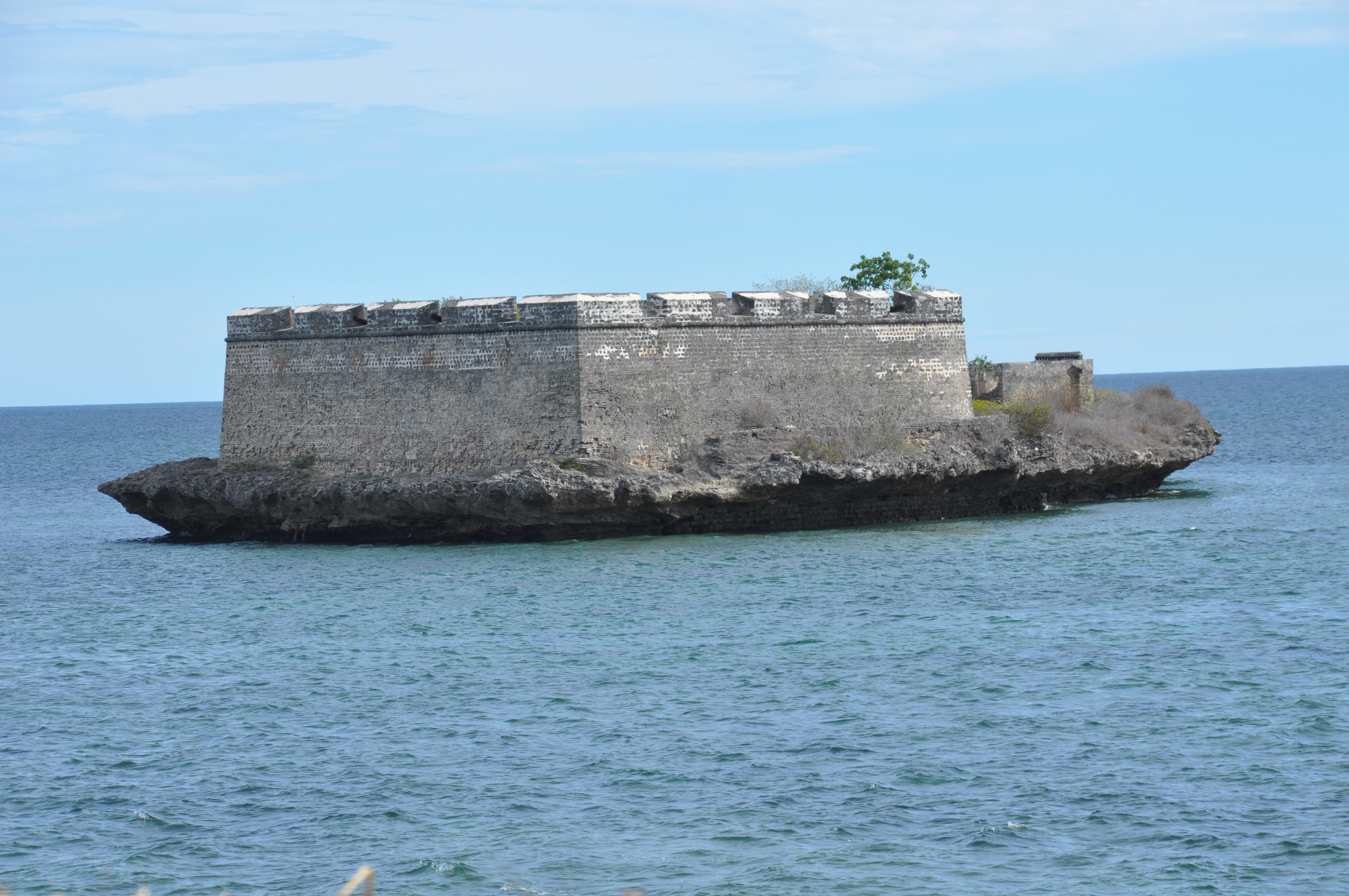
São Lourenço islet with the fort

The Islet of Saint Lawrence (Portuguese: Ilhéu de São Lourenço) is an islet off the northern coast of Mozambique. It lies just south of the Island of Mozambique, and is part of Nampula Province. The Fort of Saint Lawrence, built in 1695 by the Portuguese Empire, is situated on the islet.
