= Sal Rei =

- Settlement
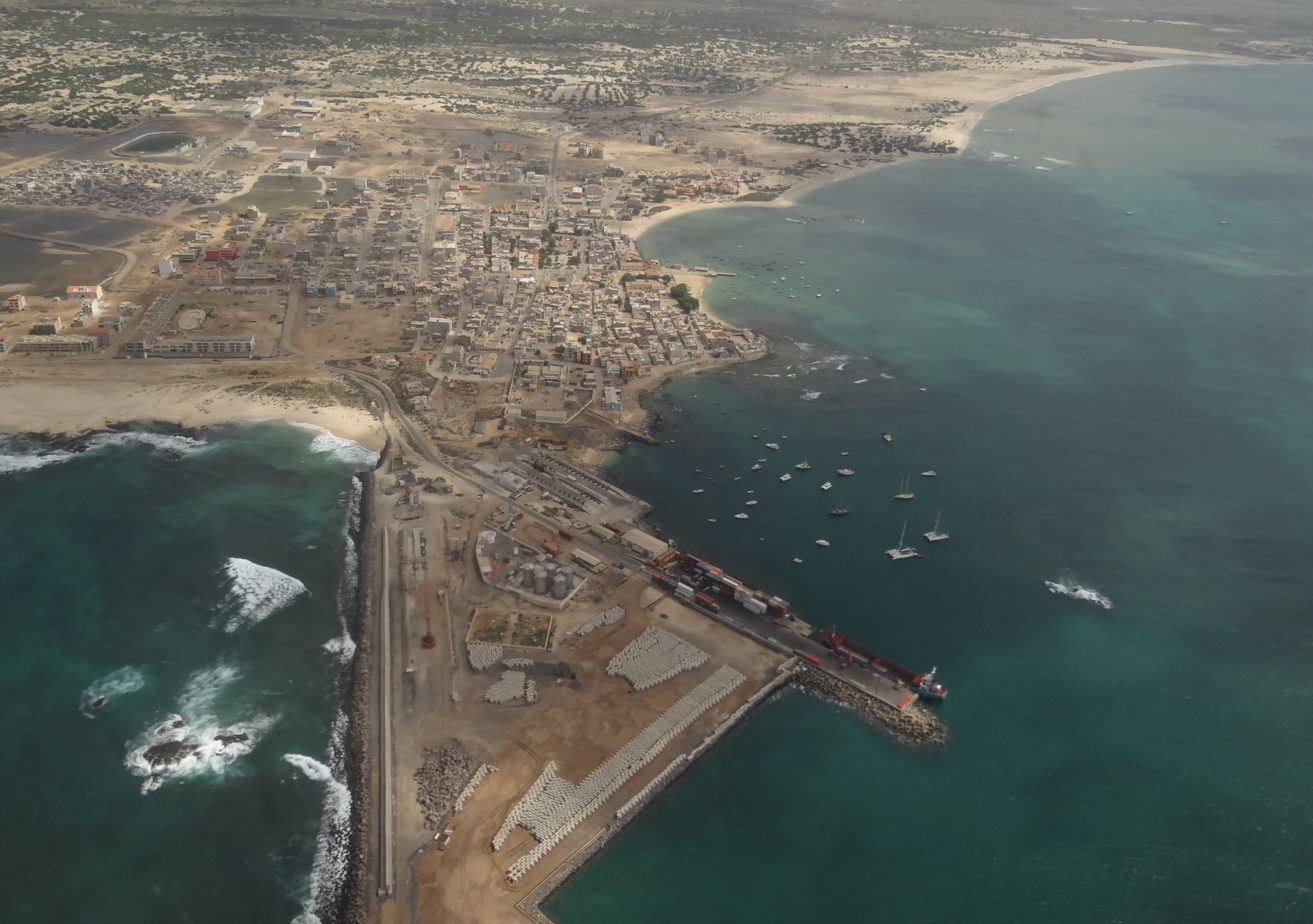
- Aerial view of Sal Rei

- Location within Cape Verde
- Coordinates: 16.177°N 22.918°W
- Country: Cape Verde
- Island: Boa Vista
- Municipality: Boa Vista
- Civil parish: Santa Isabel

Population (2010)
  - Total: 5,778
- Postal code: 5110
- ID: 51205

Sal Rei is a city on the northwestern coast of the island of Boa Vista in eastern Cape Verde. Sal Rei is the island's main urban settlement, and the seat of the Boa Vista Municipality. In 2010 its population was 5,778. The name of the settlement means "King Salt" in Portuguese. This name stems from when the island's main industry was salt production.

Sal Rei has a port on the bay with ferry routes to the islands of Santiago (Praia), Sal (Santa Maria) and Maio (Cidade do Maio). A new quay was built in 2015. West of the port lies the small islet of Ilhéu de Sal Rei. Tourism is concentrated on the area of Praia de Cabral. Port de Sal-Rei is a member port of the International Association of Ports and Harbors (IAPH).

== History ==
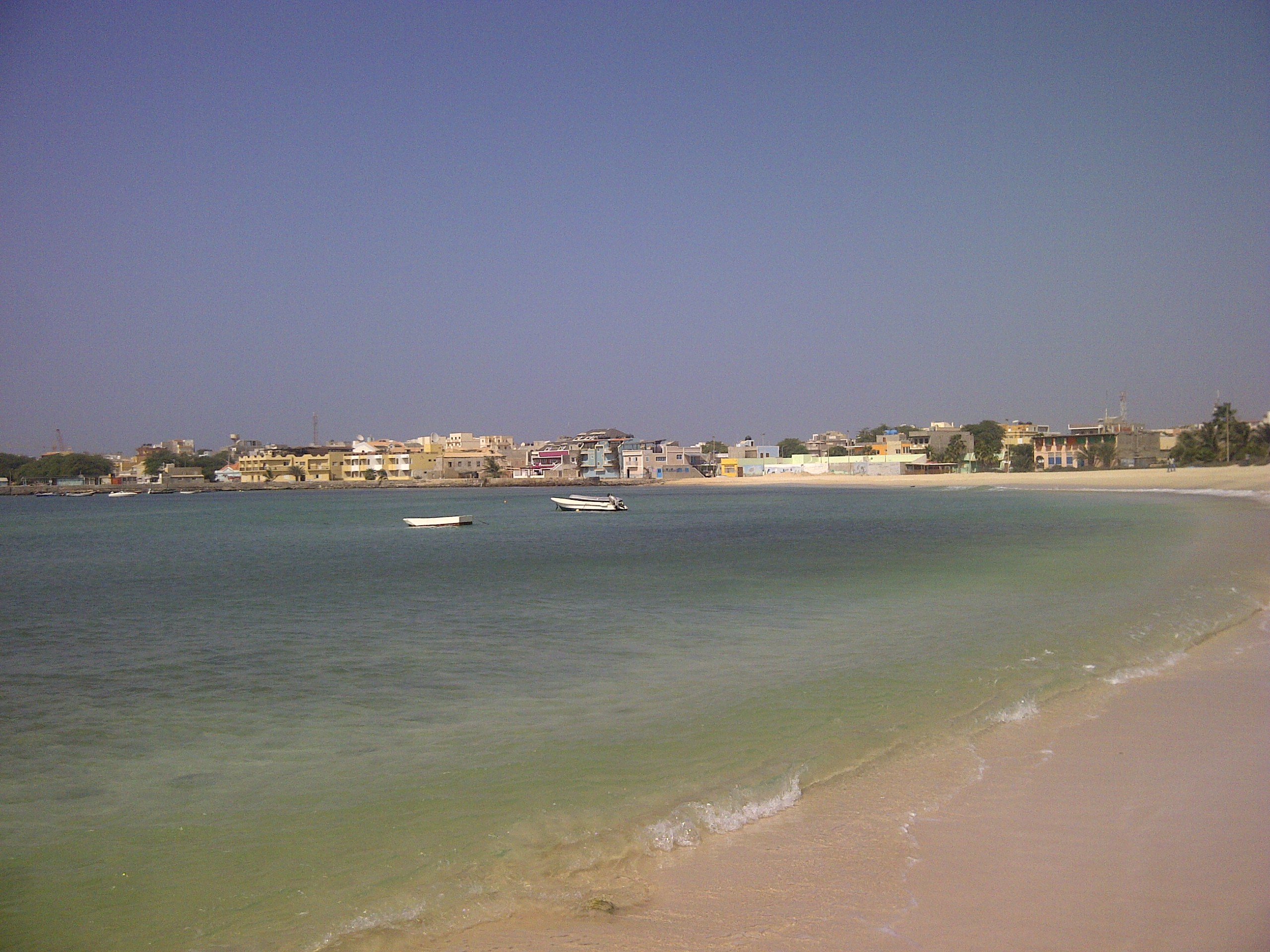
Sal Rei view from the South

The town was founded in the saltpans of Boa Vista. In 1815 and 1817, the town was sacked by pirates. Forte Duque de Bragança was built on the nearby island Ilhéu de Sal Rei to defend the town from further pirate attacks.

== Population ==
Population of the town of Sal Rei (1990–present)
1991	2000	2010
1,522	1,995	5,778

== Climate ==
Sal Rei is in a desert climate zone as does the rest of the island. Its average rainfall is 67 mm (2.6 in), and its average temperature is 24.1 °C (75.4 °F). The coldest month is February which averages 21.7 °C (71.1 °F) and the warmest is September which averages 27.2 °C (81.0 °F).

Climate data for Sal Rei, 7 metres ASL
Month	Jan	Feb	Mar	Apr	May	Jun	Jul	Aug	Sep	Oct	Nov	Dec	Year
Mean daily maximum °C (°F)	25 (77)	25 (77)	26 (79)	26 (79)	27 (81)	27 (81)	28 (82)	29 (84)	30 (86)	29 (84)	28 (82)	26 (79)	27 (81)
Mean daily minimum °C (°F)	19 (66)	18 (64)	19 (66)	20 (68)	20 (68)	21 (70)	23 (73)	23 (73)	24 (75)	24 (75)	22 (72)	20 (68)	21 (70)
Average rainfall mm (inches)	2 (0.1)	0 (0)	0 (0)	0 (0)	0 (0)	0 (0)	3 (0.1)	16 (0.6)	38 (1.5)	7 (0.3)	0 (0)	1 (0.0)	67 (2.6)
Source: Climate-Data.ORG

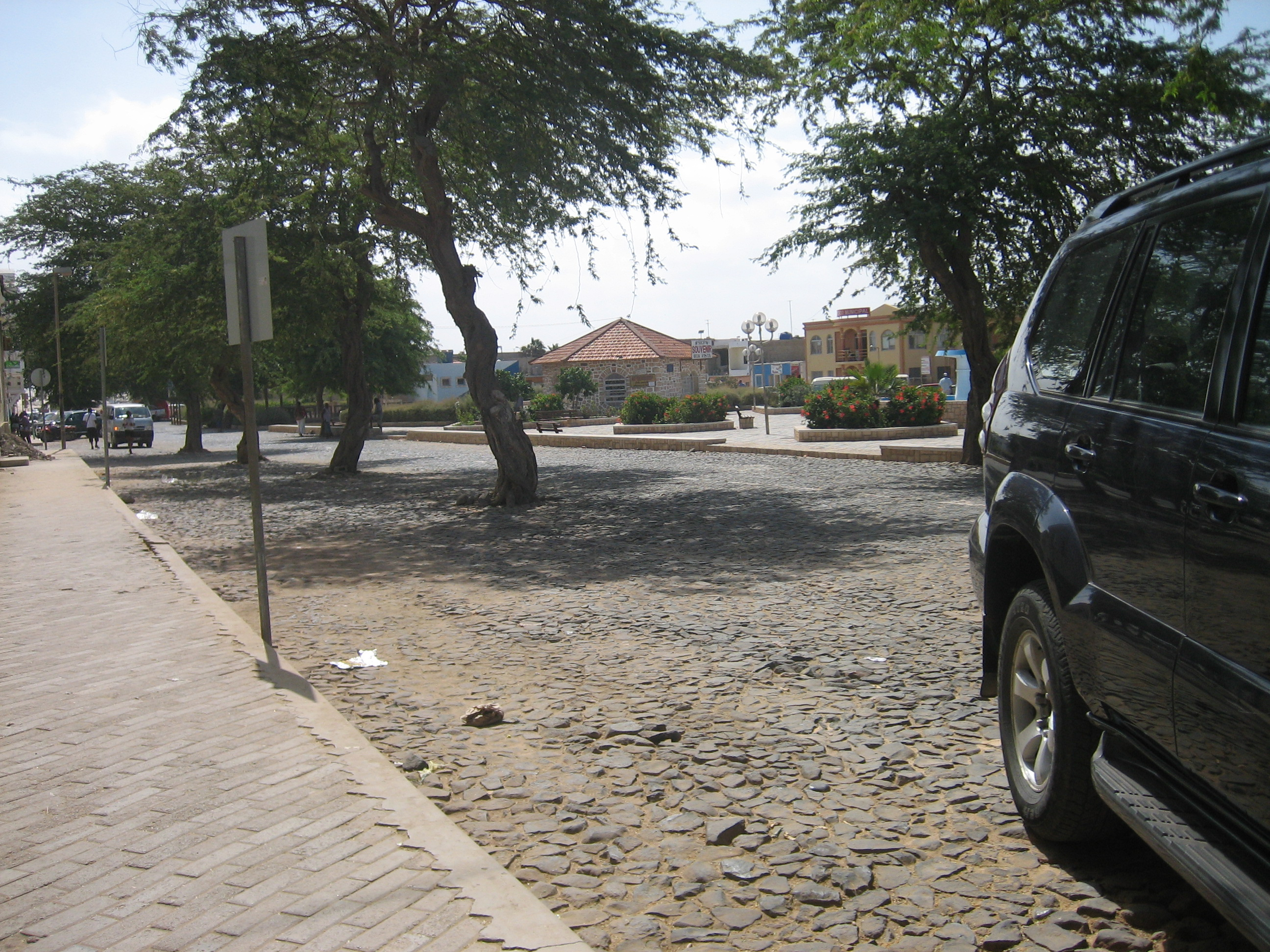
A square in Sal Rei.

== Notable people ==
- Aristides Raimundo Lima, president of the National Assembly from 2001 to 2011.

== See also ==
- List of cities and towns in Cape Verde
- Tourism in Cape Verde
