= Reorganization of the Brazilian Army in the Old Republic =

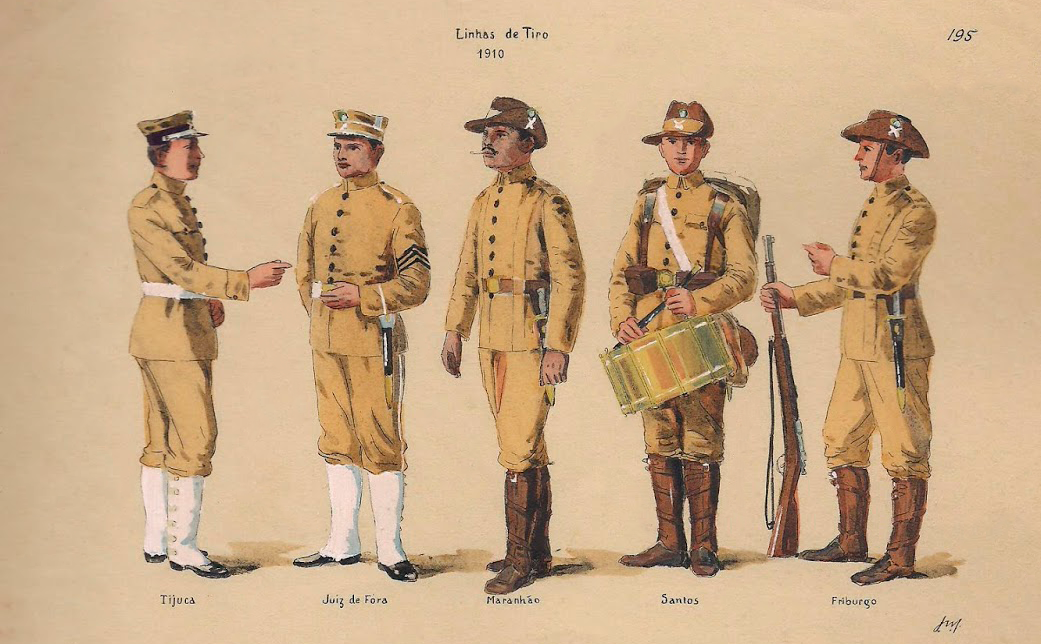
Brazilian Army infantry in 1910

The reorganization of the Brazilian Army in the Old Republic divided Brazil's territory into military regions and created divisions, brigades and, in the infantry, regiments to group the numerous military units dispersed throughout the country. The simple command chain then in use in the Army, with little organization above battalions and similar formations, gave way to permanent large echelons, with an organization based on divisions and regiments similar to that adopted in other countries. The biggest changes were made in 1908, 1915, and 1921. They were within the context of broader reform movements in the Brazilian Army.

The official consensus in the early 20th century was that the Army was inefficient and backwards, with a low budget, poor facilities, and uneven weaponry making teaching and maintenance difficult. The difficulties faced in the Canudos and Contestado wars contributed to this perception. Thus, successive modernizations and reorganizations took place, especially during the administrations of ministers Hermes da Fonseca (1907–1909), Caetano de Faria (1914–1918) and Pandiá Calógeras (1919–1922) in the Ministry of War. Several of the important changes took place during the presidency of Afonso Pena (1906–1909), as the country had good economic conditions after the government of Campos Sales (1898–1902). The reforms took place under the influence of the "Young Turks", officers who spent time in Germany and returned in 1912, and the French Military Mission, hired in 1919.

== Background ==
=== Reforms in the Brazilian Army ===
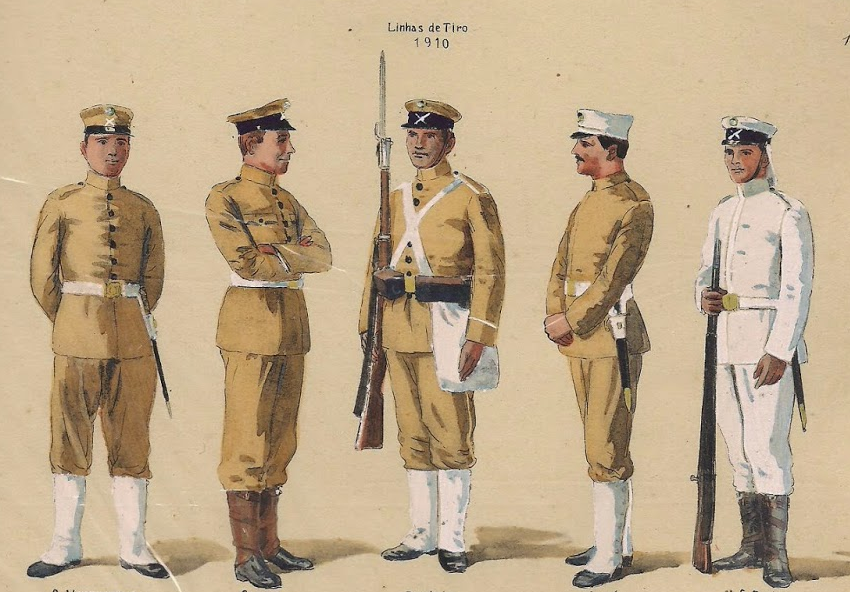
Brazilian infantry in 1910

In 1889 the Brazilian Army had 15,000 men, and could expand to 30,000 if necessary. 35% of the forces were based in Rio Grande do Sul, a border region, 10% in Rio de Janeiro (then capital of Brazil) and 5% in Mato Grosso, also a border region. In 1910 the number had risen to 24,877 men, and in 1921 it reached 76,821 "on paper". (Note: Only infantry, cavalry, artillery and engineering officers included; and enlisted personnel (except musicians), infantry, cavalry, field artillery and coast artillery, and engineering units, in addition to those of the Assault Car Company, aviation squadrons and special contingents) In reality it was below that number. Many units had not been constituted, as in the artillery, where there were only 24 of the 71 planned field artillery groups, and 5 of the 27 heavy artillery groups. Existing units had "glades" of staff shortages, which is observable in the actual availability of officers (2,551 out of 3,583 predicted) and doctors (216 out of 369 in 1920). According to data published in 1941 by the Minister of War, Eurico Gaspar Dutra, the actual effectives were 20,000 in 1920 and 50,000 in 1930.

At that time, the General Staff of the Army was created and military education and compulsory military service were reformed. Armaments were acquired and cadres such as auditors and quartermasters were constituted. Meanwhile, the new technologies evident in the First World War slowly began to enter the country. Mechanization began in 1921, with the Assault Car Company, made up of French Renault FT-17 tanks. As the Brazilian Air Force was only created in 1941, the Army and Navy operated their own planes, in addition to airships. The Army had several fighter, bombing and observation squadrons.

One of the targets of these reforms was the organization of troops, hitherto rudimentary, with battalion-level units (infantry battalions and cavalry and artillery regiments) dispersed throughout Brazil and grouped only in military districts, according to the states of the Federation where they were based.

=== Organization in other countries ===
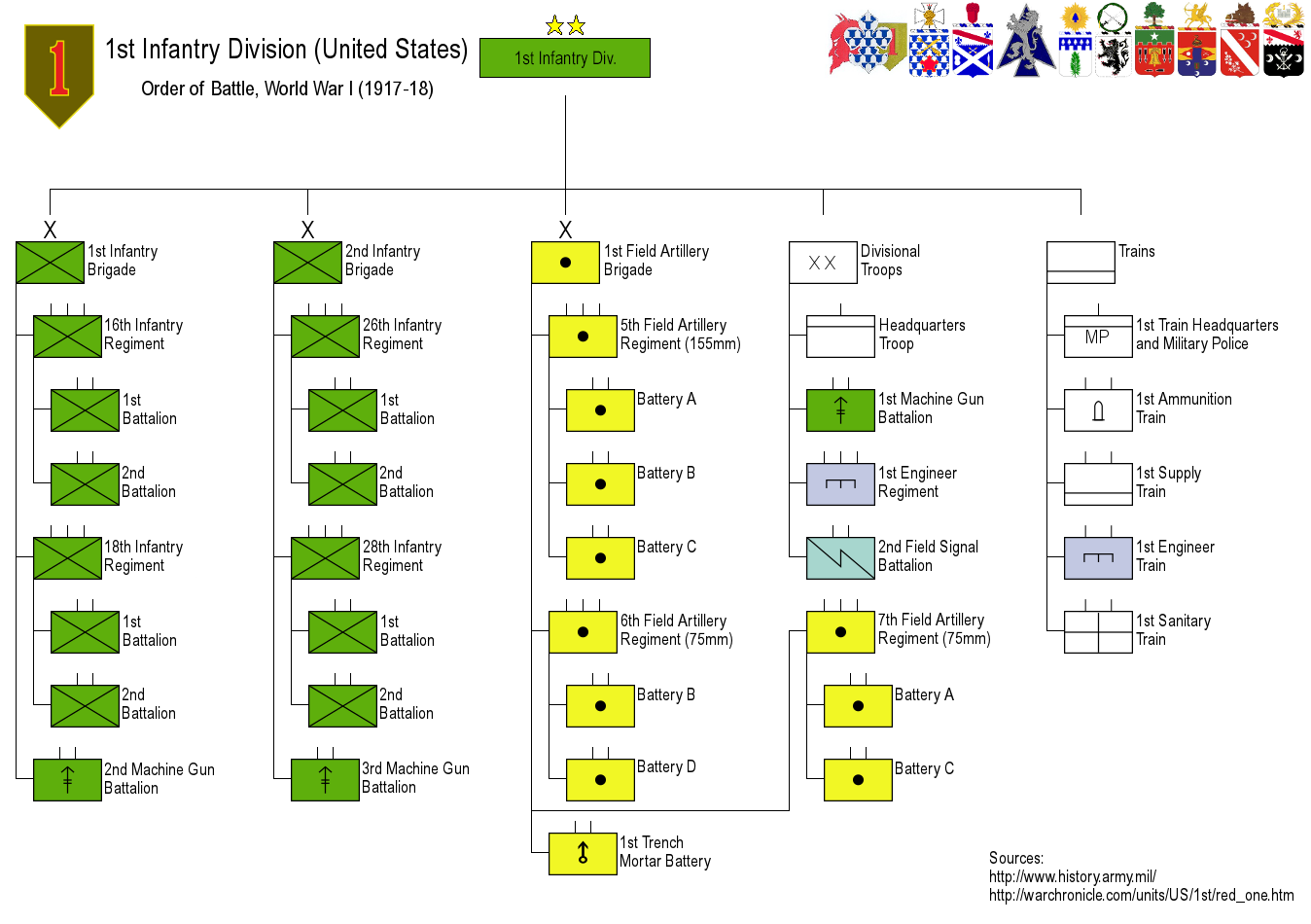
Organization of the American 1st Infantry Division in the First World War

In the first half of the 20th century most Western armies organized their forces into infantry and cavalry regiments and divisions. The infantry battalion was a basic tactical unit and had 800 to 1,000 men. Some light infantry battalions (caçadores) were independent and commanded by lieutenant colonels, however some were battalions under regiments with similar composition as in the line infantry. The rest, in the "continental" system, were commanded by majors or lieutenant colonels and grouped into infantry regiments of three to 4 battalions and a regimental HQ, which had 3–4,000 men and was commanded by a colonel. Cavalry regiments in the British and French model were equivalent to infantry battalions, with 500 to 800 men, however the American model provided for a 3 to four battalion or squadron system with the same personnel as in infantry but lesser, the same case in Germany. Artillery regiments had two to three "groups", "battalions" or "brigades", each with two to four batteries of four to six guns and a battalion headquarters supervised by the regiment. The British model, however, made these units battalion level formations.

Two infantry regiments formed a brigade, with 4–6,000 men, and each division had two or three brigades. The organization of two brigades with two regiments each is called quaternary or quadrangular. The division also had a cavalry regiment or squadron and artillery, engineering and logistical support units, thus being the basic "large unit" with operating autonomy, unlike the brigade, which had considerable size but single-armed units, without the support needed to be autonomous. Divisions in World War I had 12 to 16 infantry battalions and from 15,000 men, as in the French and Austro-Hungarian armies at the beginning of the war, to more than 27,000, as in the American Army at its end. The cavalry division was one-third to one-half the strength of the infantry division (4,500 men in the French and Russian armies to 9,269 in the British), as its regiments were also smaller.

In the interwar period in the US since 1940 the command chain was shortened by the abolition of the brigade rank, with three regiments (ternary organization) under the division. With three battalions each, the division shrunk to nine infantry battalions.

== Infantry regiments ==
The Kingdom of Brazil had infantry regiments, but since the regency period the country had only a large number of "exiguous battalions", whose number reached 40 in 1898, each with four companies. The 1908 reorganization established battalions numbered 1st to 45th, grouped into 15 regiments of three battalions each. At the same time, 12 battalions of caçadores, numbered from 46th to 57th, and 13 companies of caçadores emerged. The battalions had three companies. The 13th to 15th regiments were disbanded in 1917 and their battalions became caçadores battalions, which were now numbered 37th to 57th. In 1919, each regiment simply had 1st, 2nd and 3rd battalions, with no continuity of numbering from one regiment to another. Meanwhile, the numbering of caçadores battalions became independent, returning to a Brazilian tradition.

The law distinguished between "line" battalions, within regiments, and caçadores battalions, but since the Paraguayan War the form of combat was the same. In 1921 the nominal strength of a battalion of caçadores was 516 soldiers, against 386 in an infantry battalion within a regiment. The regiment, in turn, numbered 1,363.

The condition of the 8th Infantry Regiment in the period 1928–30 illustrates the practical application of the regiments' system. It had only two battalions, the 2nd at headquarters and the 1st seven hours away by train, with an autonomous life outside the headquarters. The 2nd battalion had only two companies, a heavy machine gun company and a supernumerary company. (Note: Equivalent to a current command company.) The barracks at headquarters had only 490 men. The then lieutenant colonel Estevão Leitão de Carvalho, named commander, did not describe the situation of the regiment he encountered as abnormal. The ephemeral 14th and 15th Infantry Regiments were made up of two battalions.

The infantry regiments lasted until the 1970s, when they were dissolved and their battalions were directly subordinated to the newly created brigades; at that time, in the 1960s, only one of the infantry regiments was complete.

== Large units ==
By 1888 the Imperial Army had constituted three brigades, but brigade commands were abolished in 1891. Brigades and divisions existed only provisionally, for wartime operations. This changed in 1908 with the constitution of five "Strategic Brigades", three cavalry brigades and a mixed brigade. Both the Strategic Brigade and the cavalry brigade were ternary, with three regiments, in the case of the Strategic Brigade, infantry. The Strategic Brigade had support units and was the largest permanent echelon. The 2nd, which fought in the Contestado War, had 4,000 men.

In 1915, the Strategic Brigades gave way to the quaternary "Army Divisions", with two brigades of two infantry regiments each. The division became the most important echelon. The infantry brigades that composed it had no autonomy, consisting of infantry only. Finally, in 1921 the "Army Divisions" became only infantry divisions, with the same organization. The cavalry brigades were also expanded into cavalry divisions, each quaternary, with two brigades of two regiments. The theoretical strength of an infantry division in 1921 was approximately 11,000 men.

Brigades and divisions remain in use into the 21st century, albeit in a different form. From 1938 onwards infantry brigades were eliminated, with infantry divisions becoming ternary. However, both infantry and cavalry returned to the brigade in the 1970s, when it became the main unit, with support units and operating autonomy. Cavalry divisions became brigades, and infantry divisions Army Divisions, merely grouping together a variable number of brigades.

Organization of the large units of infantry
Strategic Brigade (1908)	Army Division (1915)	Infantry Division (1921)
Brigade HHC; 3 infantry regiments; Regimental HHC; 3 infantry battalions; Machine gun company; Cavalry regiment; Horse artillery regiment; Separate Howitzer battery; Combat engineering battalion; Courier platoon; Train squadron; Artillery park; 3 ammunition columns; Administrative convoy; 3 brigade ambulances; Bridge equipment; Telegraph equipment; Mobile remount deposit; In mobilization: 2–3 battalions of caçadores; 2–3 companies of caçadores	Division HHC; 2 infantry brigades; Brigade HHC; 2 infantry regiments (Note: Three battalions of caçadores can replace an infantry regiment.); Machine gun company; Artillery brigade; HHBty; 2 horse artillery regiments; Separate howitzer battalion (group); Cavalry regiment; Engineering battalion; Train corps; In mobilization: Ammunition column; Engineering equipment; Health company; Administration company	Division HHC; 2 infantry brigades; HHC; 2 infantry regiments (Note: Three battalions of caçadores can replace an infantry regiment. Now each regiment, like each battalion of caçadores or mounted infantry, had its own machine-gun company.); Artillery brigade; HHBty; 2 horse artillery regiments; Heavy artillery regiment; Mountain artillery group; Cavalry regiment; Engineering battalion; Observation squadron

Location of the large units of infantry
Strategic Brigades (1908)	Army Divisions (1915)	Army Divisions (1919)	Infantry Divisions (1921)
1st: Rio de Janeiro, Federal District 2nd: Curitiba, Paraná 3rd: Santa Maria, Rio Grande do Sul 4th: São Gabriel, Rio Grande do Sul 5th: Aquidauana, Mato Grosso	1st: Recife, Pernambuco 2nd: Niterói, Rio de Janeiro 3rd: Rio de Janeiro, Federal District 4th: São Paulo, São Paulo 5th: Porto Alegre, Rio Grande do Sul	1st: Rio de Janeiro, Federal District 2nd: São Paulo, São Paulo 3rd: Porto Alegre, Rio Grande do Sul 4th: Niterói, Rio de Janeiro 5th: Curitiba, Paraná	1st: Rio de Janeiro, Federal District 2nd: São Paulo, São Paulo 3rd: Porto Alegre, Rio Grande do Sul 4th: Juiz de Fora, Minas Gerais 5th: Curitiba, Paraná

== Territorial division ==
Some provinces of the Empire had "arms commands" responsible for troops and facilities such as fortifications and arsenals. Their function as territorial inspection divisions gave way to proper troop commands in 1891, when they were abolished and the country's territory was divided into seven military districts. In 1908 the districts were abolished, creating 21 enlistment regions in the states and 13 permanent inspections under the Ministry of War. In 1915 the territory was redistributed again, this time in military regions. They were responsible for all existing units in their territory that were not explicitly under another authority. Some forces were not under regions but military circumscriptions. While the region was commanded by a divisional general, the circumscription had a brigadier general. The 6th and 7th regions, made up of only a few battalions of caçadores, were under colonels. Military regions remain in use today, with new creations and changes in territorial arrangement.

Above the regions there were inspectorates of region groups, without, however, exercising command. Two were created in 1921, the first in Recife and the second in Porto Alegre, but in 1927 their headquarters were transferred to Rio de Janeiro.

Military districts (1891)
1st: Amazonas, Pará, Maranhão and Piauí (headquarters: Belém)

2nd: Ceará, Rio Grande do Norte, Paraíba and Pernambuco (headquarters: Recife)

3rd: Bahia, Sergipe and Alagoas (headquarters: Salvador)

4th: São Paulo, Minas Gerais and Goiás (headquarters: São Paulo)

5th: Paraná and Santa Catarina (headquarters: Curitiba)

6th: Rio Grande do Sul

7th: Mato Grosso

The garrison of the federal capital, Rio de Janeiro and Espírito Santo was subordinated to the adjutant general of the Army.

Permanent inspection regions (1908)
1st: Amazonas and Acre (headquarters: Manaus)

2nd: Pará and Aricari (headquarters: Belém)

3rd: Maranhão and Piauí (headquarters: Santa Cruz)

4th: Ceará and Rio Grande do Norte (headquarters: Fortaleza)

5th: Paraíba and Pernambuco (headquarters: Recife)

6th: Alagoas and Sergipe (headquarters: Maceió)

7th: Bahia and Espírito Santo (headquarters: Salvador)

8th: Rio de Janeiro and Minas Gerais (headquarters: Niterói)

9th: Federal District (headquarters: Rio de Janeiro)

10th: São Paulo and Goiás (headquarters: São Paulo)

11th: Paraná and Santa Catarina (headquarters: Curitiba)

12th: Rio Grande do Sul (headquarters: Porto Alegre)

13th: Mato Grosso (headquarters: Corumbá)

Military Regions
1915	1919
1st: Acre, Purus, Juruá, Amazonas, Pará, Maranhão e Piauí (headquarters: Belém) 2nd: Ceará, Rio Grande do Norte, Paraíba, Pernambuco and Alagoas (headquarters: Recife) 3rd: Sergipe and Bahia (headquarters: Salvador) 4th: Espírito Santo, Rio de Janeiro and Minas Gerais (headquarters: Niterói) 5th: Federal District 6th: Mato Grosso, Goiás, São Paulo, Paraná and Santa Catarina (headquarters: São Paulo) 7th: Rio Grande do Sul (headquarters: Porto Alegre)	1st: Federal District, Rio de Janeiro and Espírito Santo (headquarters: Rio de Janeiro) 2nd: São Paulo and Goiás (headquarters: São Paulo) 3rd: Rio Grande do Sul (headquarters: Porto Alegre) 4th: Minas Gerais (headquarters: Juiz de Fora) 5th: Bahia, Sergipe and Alagoas (headquarters: Salvador) 6th: Pernambuco, Paraíba, Rio Grande do Norte and Ceará (headquarters: Recife) 7th: Piauí, Maranhão, Pará, Amazonas and Acre (headquarters: Belém) 1st Circumscription: Mato Grosso (headquarters: Corumbá) 2nd Circumscription: Paraná and Santa Catarina (headquarters: Curitiba)

== Order of battle ==
=== 1889 ===
Not including schools, arsenals, laboratories, factories, hospitals, inspectorates, military and gunpowder deposits, audits, military colonies and prisons.

Garrison of the Army of the Court and Rio de Janeiro
1st Army Brigade (São Cristóvão)
- 1st Cavalry Regiment (São Cristóvão)
- 2nd Campaign Artillery Regiment (São Cristóvão)
- 1st Engineering Battalion (Praia Vermelha, then Realengo)

2nd Army Brigade (Army HQ)

- 1st Infantry Battalion (Army HQ)
- 7th Infantry Battalion (São Bento Monastery)
- 10th Infantry Battalion (Army HQ)

22nd Infantry Battalion (Transferred to Amazonas before November 15)

23rd Infantry Battalion (Transferred to Ouro Preto before November 15)

24th Infantry Battalion (Bom Jesus Island)

1st Foot Artillery Regiment (São João Fortress)

Fortifications of Santa Cruz, São João, Lage, Praia de Fora, Pico and Gragoatá

Command of Arms of the Province of Rio Grande do Sul
3rd Infantry Battalion (Rio Grande)

4th Infantry Battalion (São Gabriel)

6th Infantry Battalion (Uruguaiana)

12th Infantry Battalion (Rio Grande)

18th Infantry Battalion (Alegrete)

28th Infantry Battalion (Rio Pardo)

29th Infantry Battalion (Pelotas)

30th Infantry Battalion (Porto Alegre)

2nd Cavalry Regiment (Jaguarão)

3rd Cavalry Regiment (São Borja)

4th Cavalry Regiment (Livramento)

5th Cavalry Regiment (Bagé)

6th Cavalry Regiment (Jaguarão)

1st Campaign Artillery Regiment (São Gabriel)

4th Campaign Artillery Regiment (Bagé)

3rd Foot Artillery Regiment (Rio Grande)

2nd Engineering Battalion (Cachoeira)

Transport Corps (Saicã)

Command of Arms of the Province of Mato Grosso
8th Infantry Battalion (Cuiabá)

19th Infantry Battalion (Cáceres)

21st Infantry Battalion (Cuiabá)

7th Cavalry Regiment (Nioaque)

2nd Foot Artillery Regiment (Corumbá)

Fortifications of Coimbra and Duque de Caxias (Corumbá)

Command of Arms of the Province of Pernambuco
2nd Infantry Battalion (Recife)

14th Infantry Battalion (Recife)

Fortifications of Brum, Itamaracá, Buraco, Pau Amarelo, Gaibú, Nazareth and Tamandaré.

Command of Arms of the Province of Bahia
9th Infantry Battalion (Salvador)

16th Infantry Battalion (Salvador)

Fortifications of São Paulo, Barbalho, Santo Alberto, São Diogo, Morro de São Paulo, Monte Serrat, São Lourenço, Santa Maria, São Marcelo and São Bartolomeu

Command of Arms of the Province of Pará
15th Infantry Battalion (Belém)

Fortifications of Macapá and Óbidos

Command of Arms of the Province of Amazonas
Fortifications of São Joaquim, São Gabriel and Santo Antônio

Provincial garrisons
In Paraná:
- 3rd Army Brigade (Curitiba)
  - 17th Infantry Battalion (Curitiba)
  - 8th Cavalry Regiment (Curitiba)
  - 3rd Campaign Artillery Regiment (Curitiba)
- Fortifications of Paranaguá and Ilha do Mel

In Santa Catarina:

- Isolated Infantry Company (Florianópolis)
- Fortifications of Santa Cruz, Ratones, São José, Santana and Barra Sul

In Maranhão:

- 5th Infantry Battalion (São Luís)
- Fortifications of Santo Antônio da Barra and São Luiz

In Ceará:

- 11th Infantry Battalion (Fortaleza)
- Fortification of Assunção

In Piauí:

- Isolated Infantry Company (Teresina)

In Alagoas:

- 26th Infantry Battalion (Maceió)

In Paraíba:

- 27th Infantry Battalion (Paraíba)

In Rio Grande do Norte:

- Isolated Infantry Company (Natal)
- Fortification of Reis Magos.

In Goiás:

- 20th Infantry Battalion (Goiás)

In Espírito Santo:

- Isolated Infantry Company (Vitória)

In São Paulo:

- 10th Cavalry Regiment (São Paulo)
- Fortifications of Santos and Bertioga

In Minas Gerais:

- 9th Cavalry Regiment (Ouro Preto)

=== 1922 ===
1st Military Region (Rio de Janeiro, Federal District)
1st Infantry Division (Rio de Janeiro, Federal District)
- 1st Infantry Brigade (Vila Militar, Federal District)
  - 1st Infantry Regiment (Vila Militar, Federal District)
  - 2nd Infantry Regiment (Vila Militar, Federal District)
- 2nd Infantry Brigade (Vila Militar, Federal District)
  - 3rd Infantry Regiment (Praia Vermelha, Federal District)
  - 1st Battalion of Caçadores (Niterói, Rio de Janeiro)
  - 2nd Battalion of Caçadores (Petrópolis, Rio de Janeiro)
  - 3rd Battalion of Caçadores (Vila Velha, Espírito Santo)
- 1st Artillery Brigade (Rio de Janeiro, Federal District)
  - 1st Mounted Artillery Regiment (Vila Militar, Federal District) (Note: 3rd group not yet organized.)
  - 2nd Mounted Artillery Regiment (Santa Cruz, Federal District)
  - 1st Heavy Artillery Regiment (São Cristóvão, Federal District) (Note: 2nd and 3rd groups not yet organized.)
  - 1st Mountain Artillery Regiment (Campinho, Federal District) (Note: Not organized yet.)
- 1st Divisionary Cavalry Regiment (São Cristóvão, Federal District)
- 1st Engineering Battalion (Vila Militar, Federal District)
- 1st Observation Squadron (Campo dos Afonsos, Federal District)
- Attaché troops:
  - 15th Independent Cavalry Regiment (Vila Militar, Federal District)
  - 6th Heavy Artillery Regiment (Army) (Anchieta, Federal District)
  - 1st Train Company (Deodoro, Federal District)
  - Assault Car Company (Vila Militar, Federal District)
- Special troops:
  - 1st Establishment Company (São Cristóvão, Federal District)
  - Aviation Company (Campo dos Afonsos, Federal District)

1st Coastal Artillery Group (Santa Cruz Fortress, Rio de Janeiro)

2nd Coastal Artillery Group (São João Fortress, Federal District)

1st Coastal Artillery Battery (Copacabana Fort, Federal District)

2nd Coastal Artillery Battery (Vigia Fort, Federal District)

4th Coastal Artillery Battery (Laje Fort, Federal District)

5th Coastal Artillery Battery (São Luís Fort, Rio de Janeiro)

6th Coastal Artillery Battery (Imbuí Fort, Rio de Janeiro)

7th Coastal Artillery Battery (Marechal Hermes Fort, Rio de Janeiro)

2nd Military Region (São Paulo, São Paulo)
2nd Infantry Division (São Paulo, São Paulo)
- 3rd Infantry Brigade (Piracicaba, São Paulo)
  - 4th Infantry Regiment (Araraquara, São Paulo)
  - 5th Infantry Regiment (Piracicaba, São Paulo)
- 4th Infantry Brigade (Caçapava, São Paulo)
  - 6th Infantry Regiment (Caçapava, São Paulo)
  - 4th Battalion of Caçadores (São Paulo, São Paulo)
  - 5th Battalion of Caçadores (Lorena, São Paulo)
  - 6th Battalion of Caçadores (Ipameri, Goiás)
- 2nd Artillery Brigade (Itu, São Paulo)
  - 3rd Mounted Artillery Regiment (Campinas, São Paulo)
  - 4th Mounted Artillery Regiment (Itu, São Paulo)
  - 2nd Mounted Artillery Regiment (São Paulo, São Paulo)
  - 2nd Mountain Artillery Regiment (Jundiaí, São Paulo)
- 2nd Divisionary Cavalry Regiment (Pirassununga, São Paulo)
- 2nd Engineering Battalion (São Paulo, São Paulo)
- 2nd Observation Squadron (São Paulo, São Paulo)
- Attaché troops:
  - 7th Heavy Artillery Regiment (Army) (Ipanema, São Paulo
  - 2nd Fighter Squadron (São Paulo, São Paulo)
  - 2nd Bombing Squadron (São Paulo, São Paulo)

3rd Coastal Artillery Group (Itaipu Fort, São Paulo)

3rd Military Region (Porto Alegre, Rio Grande do Sul)
3rd Infantry Division (Porto Alegre, Rio Grande do Sul)
- 5th Infantry Brigade (Santa Maria, Rio Grande do Sul)
  - 7th Infantry Regiment (Santa Maria, Rio Grande do Sul)
  - 8º Infantry Regiment (Cruz Alta, Rio Grande do Sul)
- 6th Infantry Brigade (Porto Alegre, Rio Grande do Sul)
  - 9th Infantry Regiment (Rio Grande, Rio Grande do Sul)
  - 7th Battalion of Caçadores (Porto Alegre, Rio Grande do Sul)
  - 8th Battalion of Caçadores (São Leopoldo, Rio Grande do Sul)
  - 9th Battalion of Caçadores (Caxias, Rio Grande do Sul)
- 3rd Artillery Brigade (Cruz Alta, Rio Grande do Sul)
  - 5th Mounted Artillery Regiment (Santa Maria, Rio Grande do Sul)
  - 6th Mounted Artillery Regiment (Cruz Alta, Rio Grande do Sul)
  - 3rd Heavy Artillery Regiment (Cachoeira, Rio Grande do Sul)
  - 3rd Mountain Artillery Regiment (Montenegro, Rio Grande do Sul)
- 3rd Divisionary Cavalry Regiment (Jaguarão, Rio Grande do Sul)
- 3rd Engineering Battalion (Cacequi, Rio Grande do Sul)
- 3rd Observation Squadron (Santa Maria, Rio Grande do Sul)

1st Cavalry Division (Santiago, Rio Grande do Sul)

- 1st Cavalry Brigade (Santiago, Rio Grande do Sul)
  - 1st Independent Cavalry Regiment (Santiago, Rio Grande do Sul)
  - 2nd Independent Cavalry Regiment (São Borja, Rio Grande do Sul)
- 2nd Cavalry Brigade (Santo Ângelo, Rio Grande do Sul)
  - 3rd Independent Cavalry Regiment (São Luiz, Rio Grande do Sul)
  - 4th Independent Cavalry Regiment (Santo Ângelo, Rio Grande do Sul)
- 1st Horse Artillery Group (São Borja, Rio Grande do Sul)
- 4th Horse Artillery Group (Santo Ângelo, Rio Grande do Sul)
- 1st Mounted Infantry Battalion (Itaqui, Rio Grande do Sul)
- 1st Transmission Squadron (Santiago, Rio Grande do Sul)

2nd Cavalry Division (Alegrete, Rio Grande do Sul)

- 3rd Cavalry Brigade (Alegrete, Rio Grande do Sul)
  - 5th Independent Cavalry Regiment (Uruguaiana, Rio Grande do Sul)
  - 6th Independent Cavalry Regiment (Alegrete, Rio Grande do Sul)
- 4th Cavalry Brigade (Livramento, Rio Grande do Sul)
  - 7th Independent Cavalry Regiment (Livramento, Rio Grande do Sul)
  - 8th Independent Cavalry Regiment (Quaraí, Rio Grande do Sul)
- 2nd Horse Artillery Group (Uruguaiana, Rio Grande do Sul)
- 5th Horse Artillery Group (Livramento, Rio Grande do Sul)
- 2nd Mounted Infantry Battalion (Rosário, Rio Grande do Sul)
- 2nd Transmission Squadron (Alegrete, Rio Grande do Sul)

3rd Cavalry Division (São Gabriel, Rio Grande do Sul)

- 5th Cavalry Brigade (São Gabriel, Rio Grande do Sul)
  - 9th Independent Cavalry Regiment (São Gabriel, Rio Grande do Sul)
  - 13th Independent Cavalry Regiment (Lavras, Rio Grande do Sul)
- 6th Cavalry Brigade (Bagé, Rio Grande do Sul)
  - 12th Independent Cavalry Regiment (Bagé, Rio Grande do Sul)
  - 14th Independent Cavalry Regiment (Dom Pedrito, Rio Grande do Sul)
- 3rd Horse Artillery Group (Bagé, Rio Grande do Sul)
- 6th Horse Artillery Group (São Gabriel, Rio Grande do Sul)
- 3rd Mounted Infantry Battalion (São Gabriel, Rio Grande do Sul)
- 3rd Transmission Squadron (São Gabriel, Rio Grande do Sul)
- Attaché troops:
  - Rail Battalion (São Pedro, Rio Grande do Sul)
  - 8th Heavy Artillery Regiment (Army) (Taquari, Rio Grande do Sul)
  - 1st Fighter Squadron and 1st Bombing Squadron (Alegrete, Rio Grande do Sul)
  - 2nd Bombing Squadron and 3rd Fighter Squadron (Taquari, Rio Grande do Sul)
- Special troops:
  - 2nd Establishment Company (Porto Alegre, Rio Grande do Sul)

4th Military Region (Juiz de Fora, Minas Gerais)
4th Infantry Division (Juiz de Fora, Minas Gerais)
- 7th Infantry Brigade (Juiz de Fora, Minas Gerais)
  - 10th Infantry Regiment (Juiz de Fora, Minas Gerais)
  - 11th Infantry Regiment (São João del-Rei, Minas Gerais)
- 8th Infantry Brigade (Belo Horizonte, Minas Gerais)
  - 12th Infantry Regiment (Belo Horizonte, Minas Gerais)
  - 10th Battalion of Caçadores (Ouro Preto, Minas Gerais)
  - 11th Battalion of Caçadores (Diamantina, Minas Gerais)
  - 12th Battalion of Caçadores (Curvelo, Minas Gerais)
- 4th Artillery Brigade (Pouso Alegre, Minas Gerais)
  - 7th Mounted Artillery Regiment (Juiz de Fora, Minas Gerais)
  - 8th Mounted Artillery Regiment (Pouso Alegre, Minas Gerais)
  - 4th Heavy Artillery Regiment (Uberaba, Minas Gerais)
  - 4th Mountain Artillery Regiment (Oliveira, Minas Gerais)
- 4th Divisionary Cavalry Regiment (Três Corações, Minas Gerais)
- 4th Engineering Battalion (Itajubá, Minas Gerais)
- 4th Observation Squadron (Juiz de Fora, Minas Gerais)

5th Military Region (Salvador, Bahia)
5th Infantry Division (Curitiba, Paraná) (Note: The 5th Infantry Division had its headquarters in the 2nd Military Circumscription and units dispersed throughout the circumscription, the 5th, 6th and 7th Military Regions. See Decree No. 15,235 of 31 December 1921)
- 19th Battalion of Caçadores (Salvador, Bahia)
- 20th Battalion of Caçadores (Maceió, Alagoas)
- 28th Battalion of Caçadores (Aracaju, Sergipe)

6th Military Region (Recife, Pernambuco)
5th Infantry Division (Curitiba, Paraná) (Note: The 5th Infantry Division had its headquarters in the 2nd Military Circumscription and units dispersed throughout the circumscription, the 5th, 6th and 7th Military Regions. See Decree No. 15,235 of 31 December 1921)
- 21st Battalion of Caçadores (Recife, Pernambuco)
- 22nd Battalion of Caçadores (Paraíba, Paraíba)
- 23rd Battalion of Caçadores (Fortaleza, Ceará)
- 29th Battalion of Caçadores (Natal, Rio Grande do Norte)

7th Military Region (Belém, Pará)
5th Infantry Division (Curitiba, Paraná) (Note: The 5th Infantry Division had its headquarters in the 2nd Military Circumscription and units dispersed throughout the circumscription, the 5th, 6th and 7th Military Regions. See Decree No. 15,235 of 31 December 1921)
- 24th Battalion of Caçadores (São Luíz, Maranhão)
- 25th Battalion of Caçadores (Teresina, Piauí)
- 26th Battalion of Caçadores (Belém, Pará)
- 27th Battalion of Caçadores (Manaus, Amazonas)

4th Coastal Artillery Group (Óbidos Fort, Pará) (Note: In the minister's report, "4th Group (1st Óbidos Battery)" and "5th Group (1st Coimbra Battery)".)

2nd Military Circumscription (Curitiba, Paraná)
5th Infantry Division (Curitiba, Paraná) (Note: The 5th Infantry Division had its headquarters in the 2nd Military Circumscription and units dispersed throughout the circumscription, the 5th, 6th and 7th Military Regions. See Decree No. 15,235 of 31 December 1921)
- 13th Battalion of Caçadores (Joinville, Santa Catarina)
- 14th Battalion of Caçadores (Florianópolis, Santa Catarina)
- 15th Battalion of Caçadores (Curitiba, Paraná)
- 9th Mounted Artillery Regiment (Curitiba, Paraná)
- 10th Mounted Artillery Regiment (Rio Negro, Paraná)
- 5th Heavy Artillery Regiment (Ponta Grossa, Paraná)
- 5th Mountain Artillery Group (Guarapuava, Paraná)
- 5th Engineering Battalion (Curitiba, Paraná)
- 5th Observation Squadron (Porto União, Santa Catarina)

3rd Coastal Artillery Battery (Marechal Moura Fort, Santa Catarina)

8th Coastal Artillery Battery (Marechal Luz Fort, Santa Catarina)

4th Military Circumscription (Cuiabá, Mato Grosso)
Mixed Brigade
- 16th Battalion of Caçadores (Cuiabá, Mato Grosso)
- 17th Battalion of Caçadores (Corumbá, Mato Grosso)
- 18th Battalion of Caçadores (Campo Grande, Mato Grosso)
- 10th Independent Cavalry Regiment (Bela Vista, Mato Grosso)
- 11th Independent Cavalry Regiment (Ponta Porã, Mato Grosso)
- Mixed Artillery Regiment (Campo Grande, Mato Grosso)
- 6th Engineering Battalion (Aquidauana, Mato Grosso)
- Mixed Observation Squadron (Campo Grande, Mato Grosso)

5th Coastal Artillery Group (Forte Coimbra, Mato Grosso) (Note: In the minister's report, "4th Group (1st Óbidos Battery)" and "5th Group (1st Coimbra Battery)".)

== See also ==
- Reorganization of the Brazilian Armed Forces during the military dictatorship
