= Bahia incident =

1864 naval skirmish in the American Civil War

Coordinates: 12°51′15″S 38°35′50″W

Bahia Incident
- Part of the American Civil War
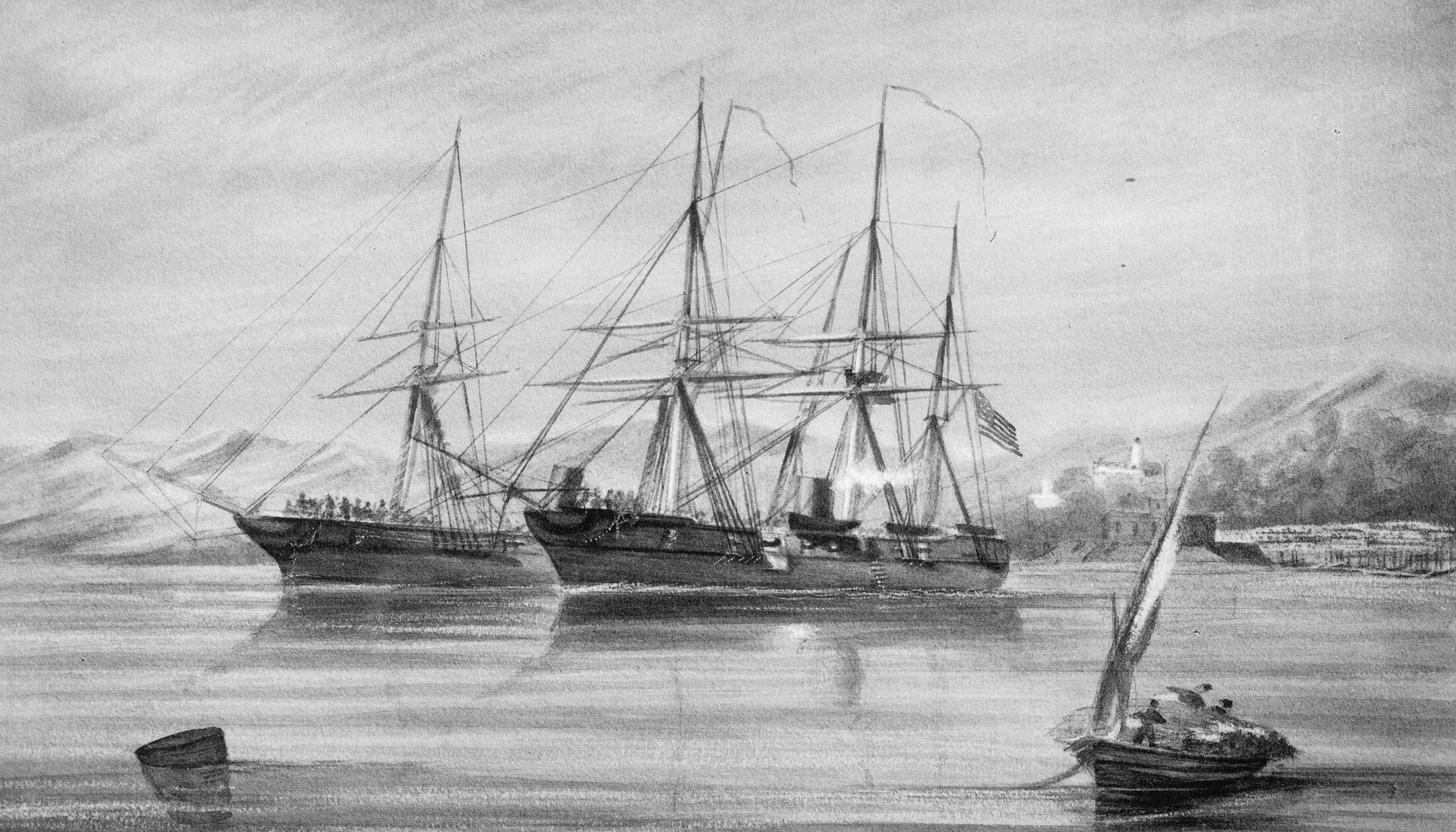
- Cutting out the Florida from Bahia, Brazil by USS Wachusett.
Date	October 7, 1864
Location	Port of Salvador, Bahia, Empire of Brazil
Result	Brazilian victory: Capture of CSS Florida; Americans withdraw from Salvador

Belligerents
United States	Confederate States	Empire of Brazil

Commanders and leaders
(United States) Napoleon Collins	(Confederate States of America) T. K. Porter	Antônio Gomes

Strength
1 sloop-of-war	1 sloop-of-war	2 forts 1 paddle steamer

Casualties and losses
3 wounded 1 sloop-of-war damaged	~5 killed ~9 wounded 60 captured 1 sloop-of-war captured	None

The Bahia incident was a naval skirmish fought in late 1864 during the American Civil War. A Confederate navy warship was captured by a Union warship in the Port of Salvador, Bahia, Brazil. The engagement resulted in a United States victory, but also sparked an incident between the United States and Brazil, over the American violation of Brazil's neutrality by illegally attacking a vessel in a Brazilian harbor.

== Background ==
In late 1864, the nine gun sloop-of-war CSS Florida with 146 officers and crew headed south along the South American coast for the Pacific. She needed repairs and coal so her commander Lieutenant Charles Manigault Morris pulled into Bahia, Brazil, at night on October 4, 1864, after a sixty-one day cruise. Unknown to the Confederates, the Union sloop-of-war USS Wachusett was nearby, under Commander Napoleon Collins. Wachusett launched a boat and sent her towards the Florida; once nearby, the Union sailors called out to the Confederate crew, asking the name of their ship. Unaware of who was inquiring, the Confederates called out that the ship was the Florida and then asked what ship the sailors in the boat were from. The Union sailors responded that they were from HMS Curlew and returned to the Wachusett, then still out of sight of the Florida.

The next morning, the Confederates spotted the Wachusett as she sailed into Bahia harbor and anchored at the entrance of the bay. Later that day Morris met with the Provincial President of Bahia Antônio Joaquim da Silva Gomes, who gave him two days to repair and coal his vessel but said that he felt that the Florida was the cause of the standoff and if a battle occurred in Bahia harbor, the Imperial Brazilian Navy would be forced to retaliate against whoever fired the first shot. An admiral at the meeting suggested that the Florida move closer to his sloop so that the Union ship would have a harder time of attacking the Confederate vessel. The citadels of Bahia, Fort Santa Maria and Fort Barra, were put on high alert. Morris did as the admiral suggested and moved his ship closer to shore. Another boat from the Wachusett approached and delivered a letter to the Florida addressed "Captain Morris sloop Florida". The rebels rejected the letter because, as one of the Confederates told the Union sailors, the ship was not sloop Florida but CSS Florida.

Commander Collins would not address the letter CSS Florida as it would be recognizing the government in rebellion. Collins then sent an American consul named De'Videcky to the Confederates with another message, but before delivering it he first read aloud a letter addressed to him. In it Collins requested that Mr. De'Videcky challenge the rebels to fight. Hearing this, Lieutenant Morris told De'Videcky that he would not attack the Union sloop and would leave harbor once he had completed his mission. However, Morris stated, “... I would neither seek nor avoid a contest with the “Wachusett”, but should I encounter her outside Brazilian waters, [I] would use my utmost endeavors to destroy her.”

== Incident ==
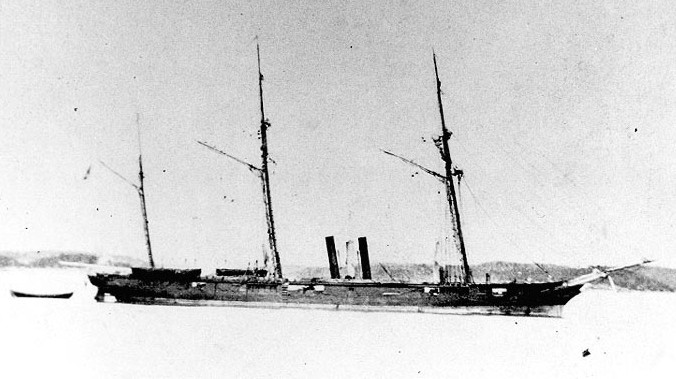
CSS Florida

The remainder of October 6 went on without incident until 3:00 am on October 7. At this time the Wachusett weighed anchor and headed for an attack on the Florida. The vessel opened fire with her 6-inch guns at a distance of 5/8 mile (1.0 km) but rough weather prevented these shells from hitting so they ceased fire. Lieutenant Morris along with half of the Florida's crew were ashore sleeping and did not participate in the battle, in command of the Florida was Lieutenant T. K. Porter. Due to the darkness the Confederates could not spot the incoming Wachusett until she was within musket's range. Master Hunter ordered his men to raise the naval ensign and open fire, they did so not with cannon but with pistols and muskets. Several lead balls struck the Wachusett and wounded three men so the Union sailors were ordered to return fire with their small arms while the ship maneuvered to line up for a full broadside.

When she came into position, the Wachusett fired again with her main guns. Several shots from the 6-inch and pivot guns hit the Florida starboard which raked her bulwarks and removed her mizzenmast. The Wachusett backed off and called out demanding the rebels surrender. When this call was unanswered the Wachusett fired again and approached the Florida for her capture. Collins ordered his men to ram the Wachusett right into the Florida so federals crashed into the Confederate ship, but neither vessel was seriously damaged in the collision. Next a Union boarding party quickly jumped on deck of the Confederate sloop and forced a surrender. Nine Confederates jumped over the side of the Florida, all of whom were wounded when the Union sailors fired on them with muskets as they attempted to escape. The Confederates, however, made it to shore. A tow line was attached to the Florida and the Wachusett began to tow the prize out of the harbor. Just then the Brazilians in Fort Barra opened fire with their cannon.

Shots whizzed past the Wachusett but none of them struck. Collins then spotted the Brazilian sloop and an armed paddle steamer heading towards his ship and firing inaccurately. Collins did not engage, he instead ordered his men to make sail as fast as they could. The Brazilians gave chase but the faster Wachusett got away. Confederate forces lost at least five men killed, nine wounded, and twelve officers and fifty-eight crewmen were captured. Left in Brazil was Lieutenant Morris, four officers and seventy-one men. Union Navy forces lost three men wounded, but only one of them seriously.

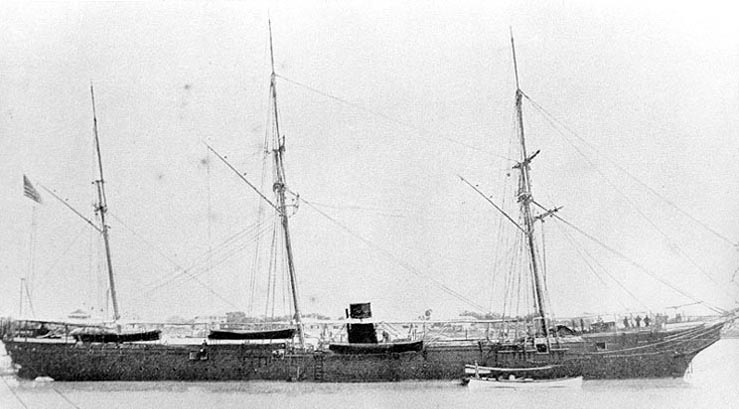
USS Wachusett

== Aftermath ==
As a result of USS Wachusett's attack on the Florida in Bahia harbor, Commander Collins was court martialed due to pressure from the Brazilian government and was threatened with removal from duty. However, the United States Navy and many Northerners felt that Collins' attack was effective in defeating the Confederates so his sentence was never carried out. Collins eventually became a captain in 1866 largely for his victory over the Florida. The Brazilian government demanded that the Union Navy return their prize to the Confederates at Bahia but the Florida was sunk in a collision with USAT Alliance on November 28 off Virginia. Some have speculated that the sinking was not an accident but was encouraged by Admiral David Dixon Porter who did not want the vessel returned to the Confederate Navy.

== See also ==
- Battle of Cherbourg
