= Admiral Collins =

Admiral Collins may refer to:

- John Augustine Collins (1899–1989), Royal Australian Navy vice admiral
- Napoleon Collins (1814–1875), U.S. Navy rear admiral
- Thomas H. Collins (born 1946), U.S.Coast Guard admiral
