= São Paulo da Gamboa Battery =

- Salvador, Bahia in Brazil
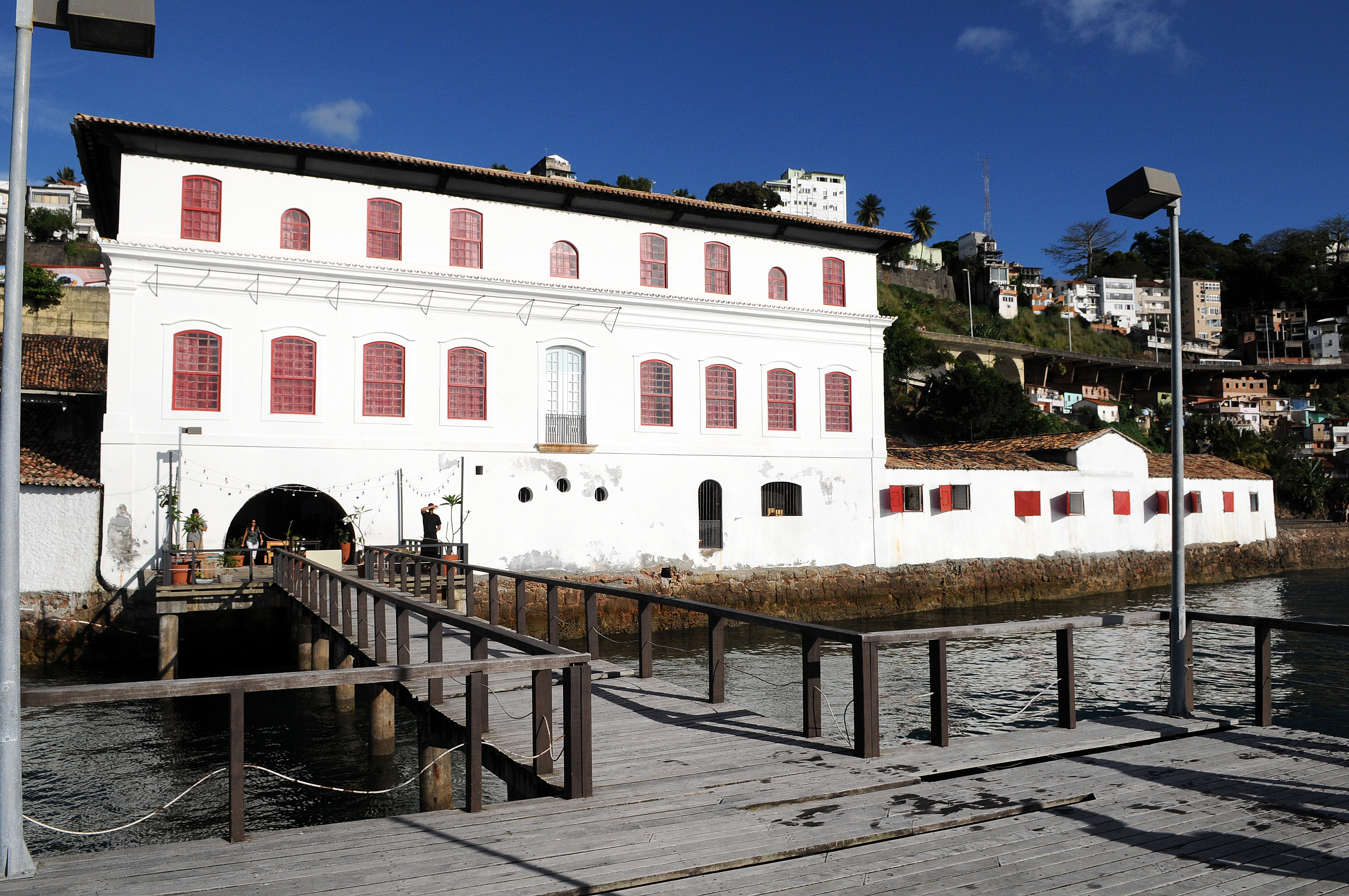

Site information
- Type: Fort

Location
- Location of São Paulo da Gamboa Battery in Brazil
- Coordinates: 12.98522363639843°S 38.52263814151232°W

Site history
- Built: 1700s
- Materials: stone masonry

National Historic Heritage of Brazil
- Designated: 1938
- Reference no.: 155

The São Paulo da Gamboa Battery (Portuguese: Bateria de São Paulo da Gamboa) is a military fortification located in Salvador, Bahia in Brazil. It is also known as the Fort of São Paulo da Gambôa (Portuguese: Forte de São Paulo da Gambôa), or simply the Fort of Gambôa (Portuguese: Forte da Gamboa). The battery was built in the early 17th century as part of a series of military fortifications in Salvador by Jean Massé (Portuguese: João de Massé), a French military engineer. The battery was built as an extension of the Fort of Saint Peter; it functioned to defend the city against Dutch and French attacks. The battery was listed as a historic structure by the National Institute of Historic and Artistic Heritage (IPHAN) in 1938. Despite its listing as a federal historic structure, it is not under the care of any public agency or institution. The battery is in an advanced state of disrepair, occupied by informal settlements, and is below a slope prone to landslides.

== Location ==
The São Paulo da Gamboa Battery is located in the small, narrow neighborhood of Gamboa de Baixo. It sits on a small cliff below Avenida Lafayete Coutinho, an avenue which runs along the coast of Salvador from Praça Visconde de Cairu in the Cidade Baixo (Lower City) to Avenida Sete de Setembro at Praça Dois de Julho. It was built as an extension to the Fort of Saint Peter, which sits on higher land with a clear view over the bay.

== History ==
The São Paulo da Gamboa Battery was designed as one of a series of military fortifications built to protect the south of the city of Salvador. The French military engineer Jean Massé (Portuguese: João de Massé) designed the battery as an extension of the Fort of São Pedro in the first quarter of the 17th century. Massé, a military engineer, worked for the Portuguese Crown in Brazil between 1713 and 1718. He worked for Pedro António de Meneses Noronha de Albuquerque (1661–1731), Viceroy of Brazil, in 1714. Miguel Pereira da Costa, a Portuguese military engineer, drew the plans for the fort and João Teixeira de Araújo (1701–1731) served as the engineer for the project. The battery replaced a smaller battery built in 1646. The São Paulo da Gamboa Battery was connected to the Fort of Saint Peter by trenches, which have now disappeared due to the urbanization of Salvador. The completion of fort and battery, located between São Marcelo Fort to the north and Forte de São Diogo to the south, formed a continuous line of defense of the southern side of the city.

The battery was well equipped; it had 19 artillery emplacements capable of firing simultaneously towards the sea. Vilhena stated that "it is, in the opinion of many, one of the greatest fortifications in Bahia." The battery was refortified and rearmed in 1875 with a 250mm Armstrong cannon. The cannon was purchased by the Ministry of War, bears the date "October 28, 1873", and was the first in Brazil from the manufacturer. It weighed 13 metric tons (14 short tons), and was known in Salvador as the "Peça Vovó" (Grandma Gun). Its range could reach the Itaparica Island at the opposite shore of the Bay of All Saints, but the cannon was rarely used due to it powerful blast. The "Peça Vovó" was removed from the site in the 20th century.

The fort was repaired in 1886 and 1906. It was well maintained at the time of the First World War, and manned by troops of the 50th Battalion of Caçadores. The battalion added fifteen pieces artillery to the original Armstrong cannon. The artillery was sold for scrap after the war. The Armstrong cannon was removed from the battery and is now in the garden of the Army Headquarters in the Mouraria neighborhood of Salvador. The battery was transferred to the National Treasury in 1937 and listed as a national monument by IPHAN in 1939.

The São Paulo da Gamboa Battery was subsequently abandoned by state and federal government agencies.

== Ownership and abandonment ==
Under Article 20 of the Constitution of Brazil of 1988 it is classified as a military installation and owned by the Armed Forces of Brazil. It, as well as ten other forts in Salvador, are assets of the Secretariat of Patrimony of the Union (SPU) (Portuguese: Secretaria do Patrimônio da União in Bahia. The SPU stated in 2020 that it has no intention to repair or maintain the Gamboa Battery or the Forte de Santa Maria in the Barra neighborhood to the south, also in an advanced state of disrepair.

== Structure ==
The São Paulo da Gamboa Battery sits above the water level of the Bay of All Saints. It has a curtain wall. The fort is on two levels and are set back a short distance from the water line.

== Protected status ==
The São Paulo da Gamboa Battery was listed as a historic structure by the National Institute of Historic and Artistic Heritage (IPHAN) in 1938.

== Condition and access ==
The Fort of São Paulo da Gamboa is in an advanced state of ruin. Its walls are at risk of collapse and it sits in an area prone to landslides. The structure is occupied by numerous informal settlements that now form part of the small Gamboa de Baixo neighborhood. It is not open to the public and may not be visited.

== See also ==
- Military history of Brazil
