= Reorganization of the Brazilian Armed Forces during the military dictatorship =

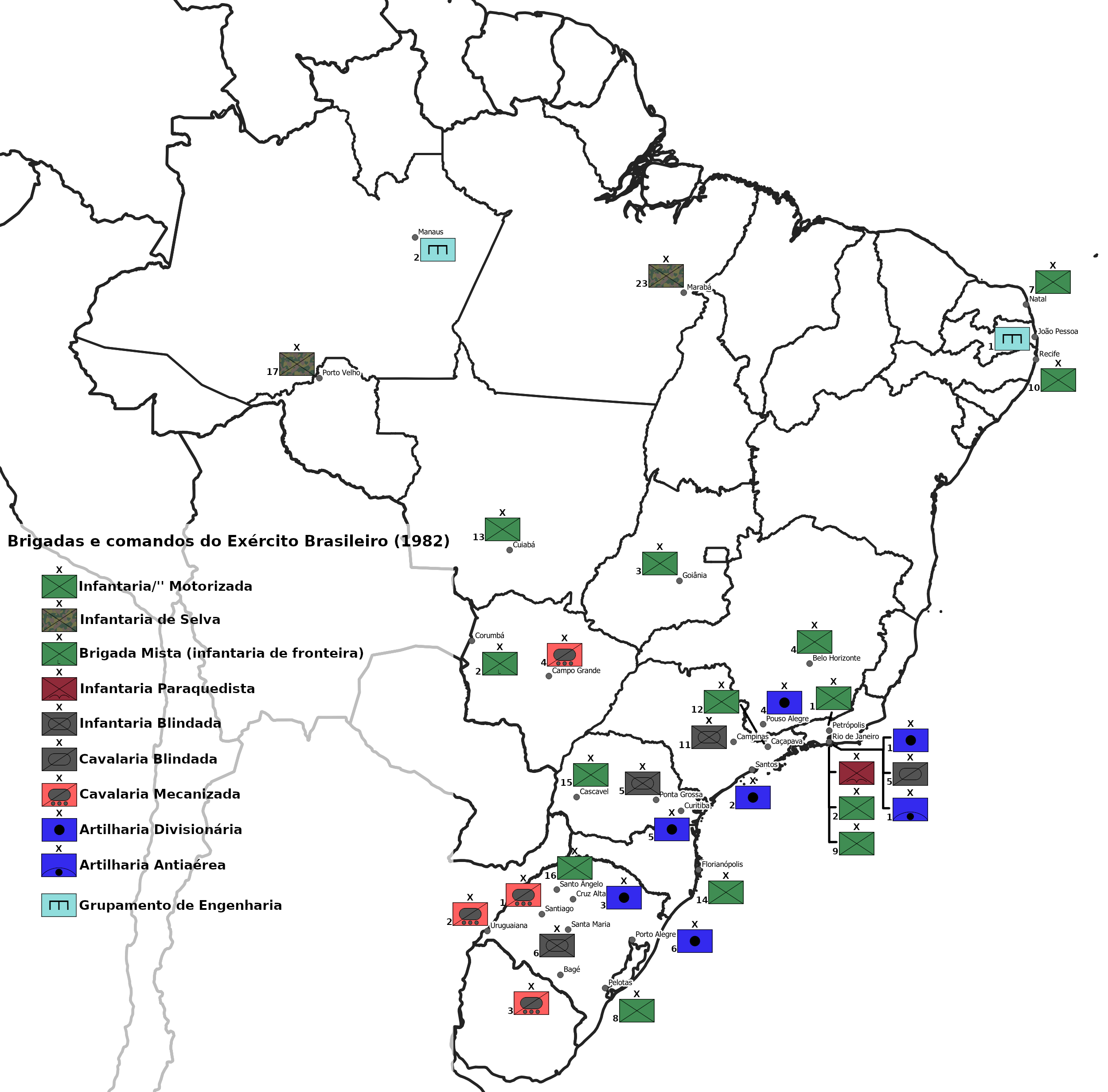
Geographical distribution of the brigades created by the reorganization (1982)

Reorganization of the Brazilian Armed Forces during the military dictatorship (Portuguese: Reorganização das Forças Armadas brasileiras durante a ditadura militar) which ruled Brazil between 1964 and 1985 centered its order of battle on brigades and upgraded its technological level. This process took place while the military held governing power in the country, a period marked by a strong interest in the might of the Brazilian Armed Forces, though military spending, relative to the population and the economy, was not particularly high by global standards. These changes, which occurred primarily in the 1970s, enhanced the Army’s combat power; however, the defeat of the Argentine Armed Forces in the 1982 Falklands War led to the realization that Brazil was lagging behind. This prompted a new phase of reforms during the "New Republic" era, beginning with the "Ground Force 90" (Força Terrestre 90) plan and its successors.

During the Cold War, Brazil was aligned with the United States, yet it sought to reduce its military dependency by developing its own military doctrine and defense industry—a process underscored by the termination of the bilateral Military Agreement in 1977. Tensions with Argentina arose in the 1970s but were subsequently eased. The primary security concern at the time was the armed left-wing insurgency, which led to the creation of counterinsurgency units, as well as intelligence and repressive apparatuses such as the DOI-CODI. Nevertheless, military authorities remained committed to developing conventional warfare capabilities, as evidenced by the expansion of mechanized and armored forces. This modernization was viewed as a source of both national and international legitimacy.

By the 1960s, calls for change were being voiced by officers who were optimistic about the country's economic potential, yet dissatisfied with the state of the ground forces—which were technologically obsolete and organizationally inconsistent. At that time, the primary major units consisted of understrength, incomplete divisions. Studies conducted by the Army General Staff resulted in the 1970 Master Plan, which restructured major units into infantry and cavalry brigades, coordinated by Army Divisions. The regimental echelon was subsequently phased out within the infantry and artillery branches. The divisions remained subordinate to four Armies and two Military Commands, with forces concentrated in Rio de Janeiro and the southern region; however, there was a moderate expansion in the Amazon, along with the creation of specialized jungle warfare units.

Up to that point, the Army had comprised motorized, mechanized, and armored forces, as well as foot infantry and horse-mounted cavalry—both of which were significantly reduced during this period. The troops were re-equipped with new small arms, trucks, M41 tanks, M113 armored personnel carriers, EE-9 Cascavel and EE-11 Urutu armored vehicles, and howitzers, including self-propelled artillery. They were organized into infantry brigades (standard, motorized, airborne, and armored) and cavalry brigades (mechanized and armored), each consisting of three to four maneuver battalions alongside combat and logistical support units. Total personnel numbered around 170,000 in the 1970s, reaching 194,380 by 1985. This brigade-based order of battle remains in effect in the early 21st century.

== Context ==
Military column during demonstrations in 1968

During the military dictatorship, political power was concentrated within “circles” consisting of technocrats from state-owned enterprises, influential military figures in government, and representatives of big capital, with the military assuming a leading role, exercised in favor of dominant interests. To maintain corporate unity following the 1964 Brazilian coup d'état, dissident military officers aligned with the deposed government were purged; however, in the years that followed, hardline political dissent emerged, as did tensions within the upper echelons—most notably the dispute between General-President Ernesto Geisel and Minister of the Army Sylvio Frota.

The high command reformed career progression, the conditions under which military personnel could hold civilian posts, the right to public demonstration, and other matters, all with the aim of distancing the intermediate ranks from politics. A proposal to unify the political leadership of the three branches of the Armed Forces under a single ministry was put forward, but it proved unsuccessful, and divisions persisted between the branches. This period was also marked by the rise of the National Intelligence Service (SNI), which operated as an “intelligence community” derived from—yet autonomous of—the Brazilian Armed Forces. The Army’s control over the Military Police forces was strengthened, effectively eliminating any remaining state-level military capabilities, and these police forces were reoriented toward counter-insurgency and the maintenance of public order.

One of the priorities of the regime established in 1964 was the modernization of the Brazilian Armed Forces. According to data from 1982, defense spending reached 12% of the national budget that year, following a doubling of expenditures between 1974 and 1980. By the end of the 1970s, however, a heavy public debt began to constrain military demands. SIPRI estimates, adjusted to 2018 dollars, indicate a peak in spending in 1976—surpassed only in 1985—with significantly higher expenditures in the years that followed. According to American estimates, Brazil’s per capita military spending in 1977 was half that of Argentina and low by global standards. Across Latin America as a whole, military budgets remained low throughout the Cold War, despite a tradition of military-led governments.

Modernization took place across all three branches of the Armed Forces. In the Navy, both the fleet and the Marine Corps saw qualitative advancements, including the modernization of the Minas Gerais aircraft carrier, the decommissioning of older warships, and the domestic construction of Niterói-class frigates. Its primary technological goal was the development of a nuclear-powered submarine. The Air Force acquired Mirage III and F-5E aircraft from abroad to ensure air superiority, established the initial CINDACTA systems, and invested in a dual-purpose platform: a satellite launch vehicle that could also serve as a ballistic missile.

The expansion of military power was anchored in a military–industrial complex. The idle production capacity of civilian industries was harnessed to re-equip the Armed Forces. Universities, military research bodies, and state-owned financial institutions fueled the national defense industry. Previously small, this sector grew into one of the most sophisticated in the Third World, developing a robust export market among other underdeveloped nations. State-owned enterprises such as Embraer, EMGEPRON, and IMBEL were established. The three largest entities in this sector were Embraer, alongside the private firms Engesa and Avibras. At the time, the sector’s contribution to the national economy was quite small, and the international arms market remained almost entirely dominated by industrialized nations. This expansion was accompanied by initiatives such as the nuclear program; both this and the space program were dual-use in nature—capable of serving either civilian or military purposes—and faced external opposition, particularly from the United States.

Weapons and “subversive material” seized in 1964

The primary foreign influence on the Brazilian Army came from the United States, dating back to the formation of the Brazilian Expeditionary Force and effectively replacing the earlier French Military Mission. In the early post-war period, there was a "copying frenzy" regarding American organization, equipment (which was easily imported following the 1952 Military Agreement), methods, and manuals—to the extent that military schools taught the deployment of units that did not even exist in Brazil. While modernization did take place, by the 1950s, dissatisfaction emerged with the imitation of a global superpower; as General Castelo Branco pointed out, this model was ill-suited to the Brazilian reality. Upon assuming the presidency in 1964, Castelo Branco maintained a very close alignment with the United States, but subsequent administrations saw a degree of distancing, and Brazil ultimately terminated the Military Agreement in 1977. There was a desire for a distinctly "Brazilian" military doctrine—a demand deemed urgent by the 1960s—which was finally realized (or at least had its foundations laid) through the radical changes implemented up until the 1970s.

== Conventional warfare and counterinsurgency ==
During the Cold War, the Brazilian Armed Forces held dual ambitions: ensuring internal security—in line with the needs of the Americans and the faction in power—and transforming Brazil into a "great power" (a Potência) backed by military might. In the 1960s, the prospect of a war with neighboring countries was remote. Under American influence, Brazilian officers envisioned an expeditionary force for a conflict on another continent. Meanwhile, in the postwar period, the Americans believed that mechanisms such as the Inter-American Treaty of Reciprocal Assistance would prevent regional wars, leading Latin American armed forces to take on a greater internal role. Brazilian officers had been studying "revolutionary warfare" since the 1950s. With the onset of the military dictatorship, the Brazilian Armed Forces set out to suppress political dissent. Throughout the 1960s and 1970s, the threat of a communist revolution became the primary concern in the realm of defense and security.

M41 combat tank for conventional warfare

The dictatorship faced an armed struggle from the left, to which it responded harshly by building an intelligence apparatus comprising both civilian and military components. The Army Intelligence Center, established in 1967, centralized intelligence gathered by the "2nd Sections" (intelligence units) of the various General Staffs; in doing so, it encroached upon the authority of the Army General Staff (EME) and created a politically significant structure that operated parallel to the formal chain of command. The national territory was divided into "Internal Defense Zones"—corresponding to the Army’s regional commands—through which Army commanders could call upon units from the Navy and the Air Force. They also relied on the newly created DOI-CODI centers, which functioned as interagency organizations staffed primarily by police personnel. The 1970 Master Plan (Plano Diretor) envisioned two scenarios: "Alpha"—a revolutionary war in Latin America—and "Beta"—a war between the Western and Communist blocs. The "Alpha" scenario was considered the most likely and comprised three variants: one occurring within national territory, a second in another country, and a third combining both, potentially involving offensive operations on foreign soil. Under the "Beta" scenario, the country would contribute an expeditionary army corps to the Western bloc. The Paratrooper Brigade became involved in the repression of armed struggle and helped form commando and special forces units, while the creation of Jungle Infantry Brigades also reflected internal security concerns. This subject was studied in military schools. The Araguaia Guerrilla War (1972–1975) served as the primary laboratory for counterinsurgency operations.

Should an external conflict arise, Argentina was identified as the likely opponent. Relations grew tense during the 1970s, driven by Argentine concerns regarding their own weakness vis-à-vis Brazil in the continental power struggle; however, from 1979 onward, a diplomatic rapprochement took place. Tensions subsequently subsided. In 1971, Brazil planned an armed intervention in the Uruguayan elections, designated "Operation Thirty Hours".

Combat in a large-scale insurrectionary war would have had deleterious consequences for the Army; however, the vast majority of troops did not participate in counterinsurgency operations. The weakness of the guerrillas did not justify the deployment of regular forces on a large scale, and such attempts yielded poor results. The National Security Doctrine and pressure from the hardline faction favored internal security at the expense of external security; however, the military held the view that a conventional warfare force could adapt to irregular warfare, but not the other way around. Expenditures on re-equipment and reorganization—particularly regarding mechanized and armored forces—were clearly geared toward conventional warfare. Despite the rivalry with Argentina, the primary motivation was to modernize the Army as part of a broader modernization of the State, thereby securing both domestic and international legitimacy. To ascend to the status of a great power—as the leadership envisioned—an Army of commensurate stature was required.

== Reform Process ==
=== Development of the 1970 Plan ===
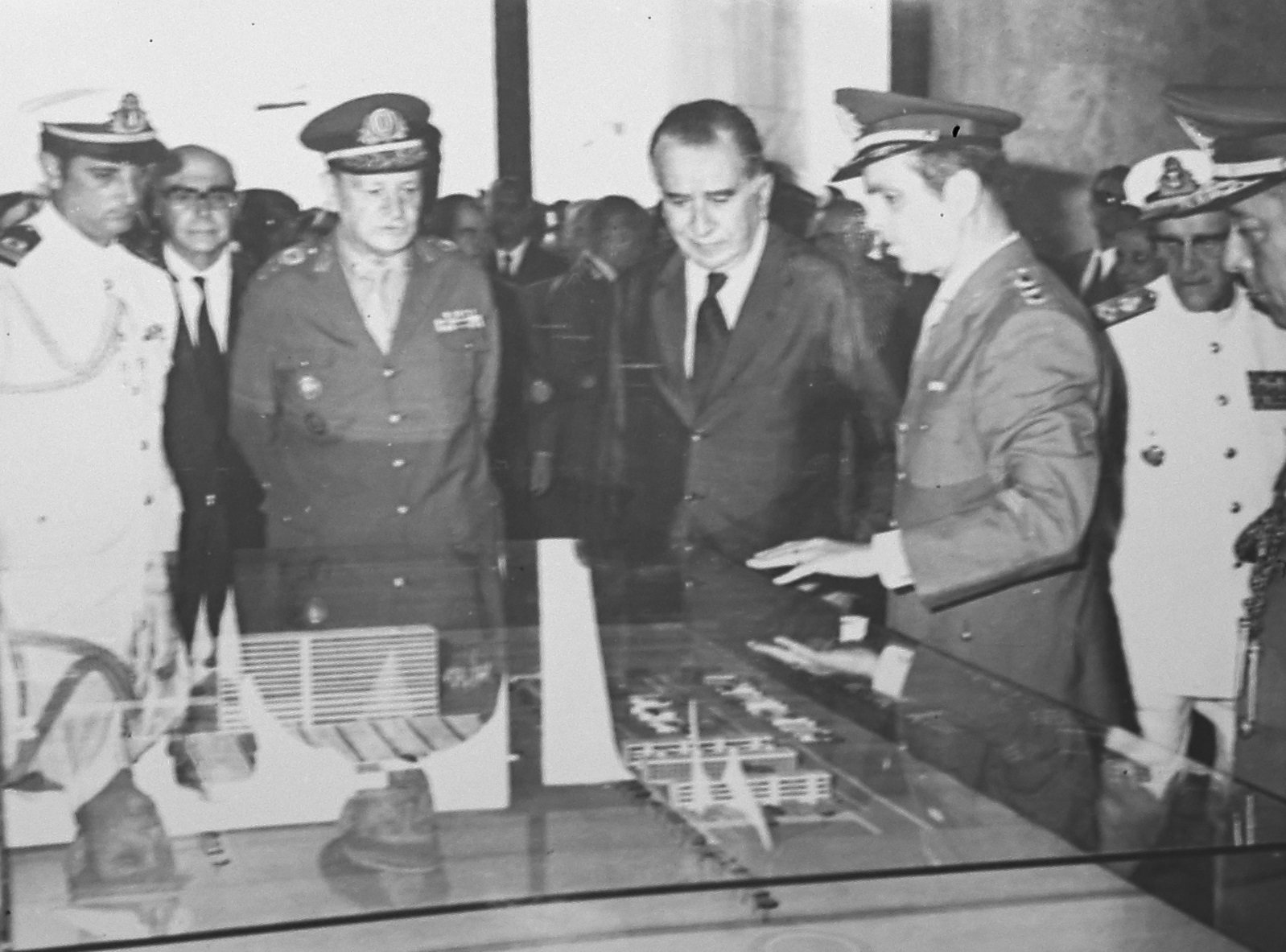
President Emílio Garrastazu Médici inaugurates a military hospital

Army reorganizations took place every decade. Between 1945 and 1964, several innovations were introduced, including a more offensive combat posture, a relaxation of disciplinary standards, improved training for enlisted personnel—along with a narrowing of the gap between them and the officer corps—and the division of the national territory into "Military Zones" (later redesignated as "Armies"). With the acquisition of American equipment, the military adopted numerous technologies from the Second World War, leading to the emergence of mechanized, armored, and airborne/air-mobile forces. Even so, the Army was unable to fully match American standards.

By the 1960s, the officer corps viewed existing doctrine and organizational structures as obsolete. Military journals, such as A Defesa Nacional, began discussing organizational reforms and the modernization of military hardware. Concurrently, there was a sense of optimism regarding the national economy, particularly with the "economic miracle" that emerged toward the end of the decade. Studies conducted by the Army General Staff between 1967 and 1970 identified deficiencies in troop strength, territorial distribution, logistics, morale, and equipment. The command structure suffered from "macrocephaly" (an over-bloated administrative apparatus), and 87% of the budget was consumed by personnel costs, leaving only 13% for operational expenses and investments. The political climate was conducive to change, allowing the debate on modernization to take place entirely within the institution itself.

Between 1960 and 1970, the Army entered a new phase of reorganization and re-equipment. In 1967, the Army General Staff initiated studies for a new divisional organization. In 1968, three brigades were established on an experimental basis, and in 1969–1970, officers from the Army Command and General Staff College—who had already been researching the subject—were brought into the EME to contribute to the effort. The outcome of this work was the 1970 Master Plan for Army Organization, submitted to the Minister of the Army in November, which defined the doctrinal transformation of the decade. Also emerging was the Directive for the Re-equipment of the Army for the 1970–1973 period, which still relied upon the American Military Agreement.

== Results ==
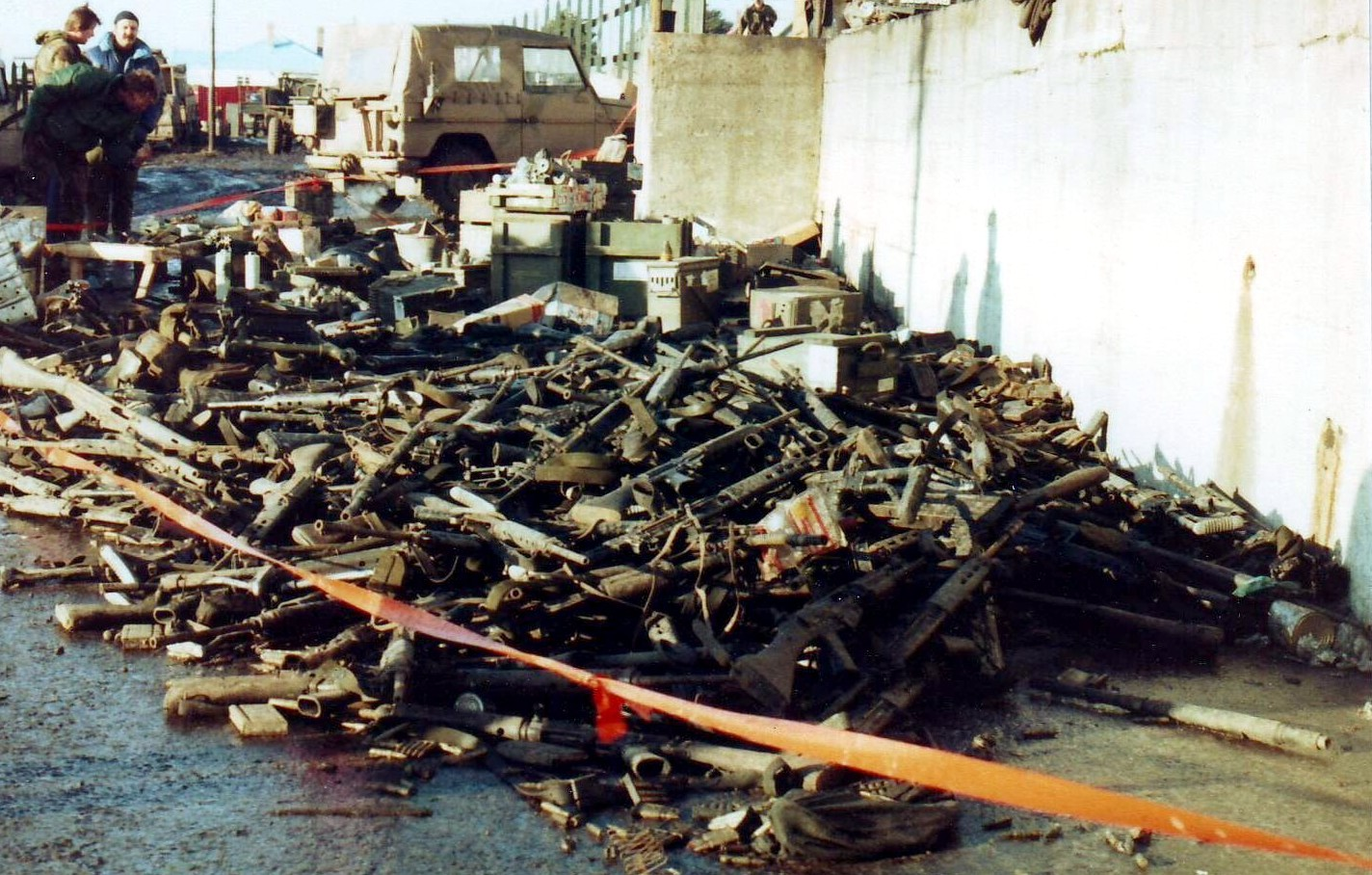
Weapons abandoned by the Argentines following their defeat in 1982—a source of alarm for the Brazilian military

The process involved significant investment in equipment, the creation and deactivation of units, and an attempt to establish a viable reserve force. Organizational structures were transformed between 1970 and 1973, followed by a re-equipment phase beginning in 1974. By 1981, the Army had transitioned from 12 divisions and one air-mobile brigade—its structure in 1968—to 7 divisions and 23 brigades. Combat power increased between 1960 and 1980, driven by more technologically advanced equipment, reduced reliance on foreign sources, and a more consistent organizational framework aligned with established doctrine. Training improved through a new military instruction system, developed with the assistance of experts in pedagogy and psychology. Numerous doctrinal publications covering both conventional and unconventional warfare were produced, introducing innovations in combat tactics and logistics. In 1986, a U.S. Air Force publication offered a positive assessment of the training of officers, discipline, esprit de corps, and the conscription system within the Brazilian Army. While the diversity of weaponry—sourced from various Western nations—created certain challenges, the domestic defense industry continued to grow.

There were delays and discrepancies regarding some aspects of the Master Plan, and certain objectives—such as the acquisition of helicopters for an Army Aviation branch and the creation of Territorial Defense Battalions (BDTs)—were never realized. The concept was to optimize force allocation through three echelons: operational, strategic coverage/surveillance, and territorial defense. The operational echelon, comprising the most capable forces, would remain mobile and ready for deployment, while the other echelons would be permanently stationed in their respective areas, even during peacetime. The BDTs were intended to operate under commands subordinate to the Military Regions, formed through the transformation of the existing Military Service Districts. They were to use older equipment, left over from the re-equipping of other forces. The first BDT (Batalhão de Defesa Territorial — Territorial Defense Battalion) was planned for Campos dos Goytacazes. The idea was eventually abandoned; the closest equivalent today consists of the mobilizable personnel within the Tiros de Guerra (local military training detachments).

Foreign estimates of the Army’s troop strength projected an increase from 120,000 men in 1970 to 182,000 by 1979, yet the 170,000-man figure established by the 1970 Plan was already the existing strength at the start of the decade—a level the Plan aimed to maintain. Between 1960 and 1980, through the deactivation and creation of various units, the net change at the battalion level was as follows: +9 in infantry, -4 in cavalry, +2 in field artillery, -7 in anti-aircraft artillery, +2 in combat engineering, +5 in signals, and +17 in logistics battalions. By 1985, the force reached 194,380 personnel, and the following year the Army envisioned even greater expansion—aiming for 300,000 men by 2015—a goal that never materialized.

A shock greater than those of the 1970s occurred in 1982, with the war between Argentina and the United Kingdom over the Falkland Islands. The Brazilian Armed Forces were technologically inferior to those of Argentina—which, in turn, were defeated by an enemy operating from a base 6,000 km away (Ascension Island). Beyond the technological gap faced by Brazil, it became clear that the United States did not extend its continental protection to Argentina during the conflict. The Argentine defeat was a source of concern for the military during the process of redemocratization, a period in which the Army sought professionalization, modernization, and distance from political-ideological conflict.

Studies of the war conducted by the Army General Staff (EME) starting in 1982 provided the foundation for reforms undertaken during the "New Republic," beginning with the "Ground Force 90" (Força Terrestre 90) plan, which was implemented between 1986 and 1990 under the first post-dictatorship administration.The war had brought into question various operational realities—such as the lack of integration between the different military branches—as well as technological shortcomings (highlighting the need for Army aviation and electronic warfare) and human-resource issues (such as the reliance on mandatory military service). In general, only the technological aspects were effectively addressed in the years that followed.

=== Maneuver Units ===
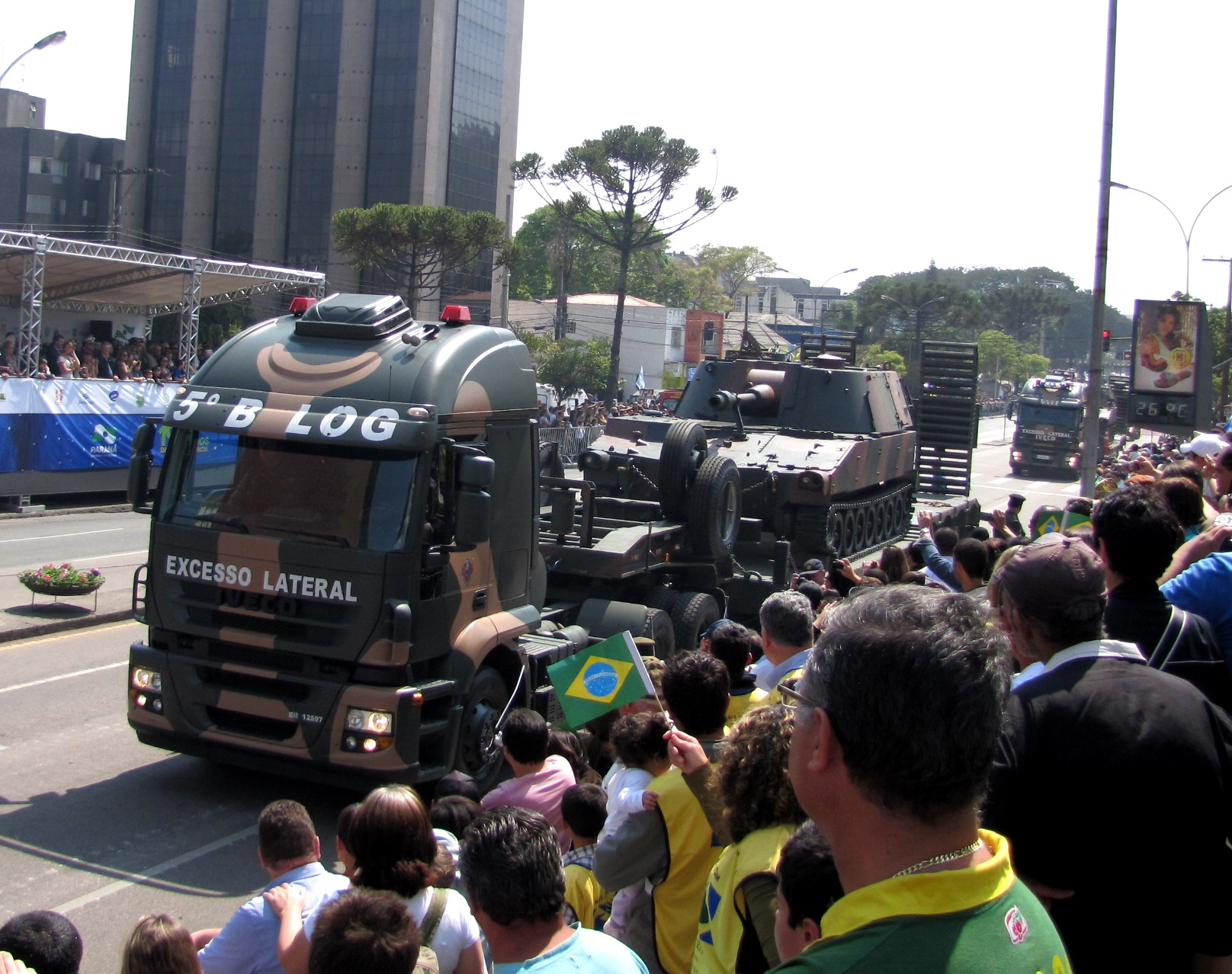
A truck from a Logistics Battalion carries an M108 howitzer

In the 1960s, while modern armies were becoming fully motorized and mechanized, Brazil’s military still operated a mix of these technologies alongside animal-drawn transport, foot infantry, and horse-mounted cavalry. In practice, the horse-mounted cavalry would requisition civilian vehicles whenever necessary. All armored vehicles were of American origin: M8 Greyhound, M20, and M3A1 Scout Cars; M2, M2A1, M3, M3A1, and M5 half-tracks; and M3/M3A1 Stuart, M4 Sherman, and M41 Walker Bulldog tanks. This reliance on foreign equipment complicated maintenance and the procurement of spare parts.

Small arms in the 1960s included Colt 1911A1 and Smith & Wesson 1917 pistols, INA 1950 and 1953 submachine guns, and Madsen 1917 and Browning M1919 machine guns. Instead of modern automatic rifles, the military used bolt-action Mauser 1908 rifles and the Itajubá M954 carbine. As part of a modernization effort, the military adopted NATO-standard calibers: 9x19mm Parabellum for pistols (Colt M1911A1, 1973 model, and Beretta, 1975 model) and submachine guns (Beretta, 1972 model), and 7.62x51mm for rifles and machine guns (FN FAL, FN FAP, and FN MAG).

=== Infantry ===
In the 1960s, the infantry consisted of independent light infantry battalions, infantry battalions organized within regiments, and armored infantry battalions (BIBs)—equipped with half-tracks—within the Armored Division. Each infantry regiment was intended to comprise three battalions and four regimental companies (command, service, medium tank, and heavy mortar), totaling 3,262 men. The battalions were structured to include three rifle companies, one command company, and one heavy weapons company. In reality, only the Infantry School Regiment was fully manned; the others had only one or two battalions, each containing just two of the three authorized rifle companies. There were also three Light Tank Battalions (BCCL), which were classified as infantry units. Equipped with M3 and M3A1 Stuart tanks, they followed an obsolete French doctrine that viewed tanks primarily as infantry-support vehicles.

After 1970, the regimental structure was abolished, and the battalions became independent units. A significant process of motorization and mechanization took place, with the vehicle fleet supplied largely by the domestic automotive industry, which provided unarmored vehicles such as trucks. Most infantry battalions became "motorized infantry battalions" (BI Mtz)—a change that affected only their mode of transport, as combat operations remained dismounted. The number of armored infantry battalions (BIBs) increased from two to seven, with these units adopting the M113 armored personnel carrier. Other specialized categories emerged, including air-transportable (later airborne/paratrooper) infantry battalions and the newly established jungle infantry battalions. The light tank battalions were converted into armored infantry battalions.

=== Cavalry units ===
In the 1960s, the cavalry branch consisted of horse-mounted regiments (RC), motorized regiments (RCM)—which were, in effect, motorized infantry—mechanized reconnaissance regiments (R Rec Mec) equipped with lighter armored vehicles, and main battle tank battalions (BCC). With the exception of the 11th, the horse-mounted regiments fielded only two of the three authorized rifle squadrons. Despite their designation, the mechanized reconnaissance regiments (R Rec Mec) were tasked with missions beyond mere reconnaissance.

Following the example of modern armies, which centered their doctrine on mechanized and armored forces, Brazil expanded its own—a process facilitated in part by the domestic defense industry. By 1973, most regiments had replaced their horses;[86] however, along the border with Bolivia, this transition continued into the 1980s. The "Independence Dragoons" (Dragões da Independência) and two other guard regiments retained their horses to preserve tradition. The motorized cavalry was phased out, while the number of mechanized and armored regiments increased significantly.

The mechanized reconnaissance regiments were reorganized into mechanized cavalry regiments, and the tank battalions were upgraded to full regiments. Armored cavalry regiments were also established, each comprising two tank squadrons and two armored rifle squadrons (equivalent to armored infantry). The RCB possessed greater offensive capability than the RC Mec, and its tracked armored vehicles offered superior tactical mobility. In contrast, the RC Mec—equipped with wheeled armored vehicles (the EE-9 Cascavel and EE-11 Urutu)—relied more heavily on road networks and was tasked with reconnaissance and security operations across broad fronts. Many additional M41 tanks were purchased, going to the armored cavalry regiments and replacing the Shermans and Stuarts, which were then transferred to the mechanized cavalry units. The domestic industry undertook several projects to upgrade the imported tracked armored vehicles; in 1979, in response to the development of the Argentine Medium Tank—which was superior to the M41—a project was launched for a new main battle tank, the MB-3 Tamoyo, to be accompanied by a successor to the M113, the CBTP Charrua. This new family of armored vehicles never progressed beyond the experimental phase.

=== Support units ===
In the 1960s, Brazilian field artillery replaced its German 75mm Krupp guns with American 105mm M101 and M102 howitzers, while medium artillery utilized American 155mm M114s. Anti-aircraft artillery replaced German 88mm guns with American 40mm and 90mm models—all of which were already obsolete due to the advent of jet aircraft. Existing artillery groups were intended for the defense of the interior, leaving divisions in the field without any anti-aircraft support. Coastal artillery—a branch considered obsolete—employed British 152.4mm Vickers-Armstrong guns. There were howitzer regiments—theoretically consisting of three groups, though none were at full strength—along with independent gun and howitzer groups. The nomenclature was confusing, with some groups designated by the specific caliber of their guns or howitzers, while others were simply labeled "artillery" units.

The regiments were eventually disbanded, and the designations for the groups were standardized; each was defined by its branch (artillery) and its specific function (field, airborne/jungle/self-propelled field, anti-aircraft, etc.). In the 1970s, the Army acquired the Italian OTO Melara Mod 56—a modular, easily transportable piece—for airborne and jungle units, as well as the American M108 tracked howitzer, which was capable of keeping pace with armored units. While the introduction of self-propelled artillery represented a major advancement for the Army, the M108 was already considered outdated in terms of range and firepower by the time it was purchased. Its caliber was 105 mm, while the Americans had already developed the 155 mm M109.

In terms of anti-aircraft artillery, the number of groups was reduced from seven to three. They were equipped with a system based on twin 35 mm Oerlikon (Italo-Swiss) automatic cannons, paired with a Super Fledermaus fire-control system. Although sophisticated, these were limited to low-altitude engagement, and Brazil did not acquire missile systems for medium or high-altitude defense. The 40 mm cannons were reassigned to batteries within the brigades. Anti-aircraft defense remained deficient.

The number of combat engineering and communications units increased. Those attached to armored brigades were provided with their own armored vehicles. Supply, transport, medical, maintenance, and service operations were consolidated into new Logistics Battalions (B Log).

== Divisions and battalions ==
In 1960, the Army consisted of seven Infantry Divisions (DIs), four Cavalry Divisions (DCs), one Armored Division (DB), an Airborne Division nucleus, a mixed brigade, and a Group of School Units (GUEs), in addition to smaller independent units. The DIs contained major subordinate units—Divisional Infantry and Divisional Artillery—which grouped together units from those respective branches. The mixed brigade lacked true autonomy due to a shortage of support units, serving primarily to group together territorial and border-defense forces. The GUEs comprised a set of units that strictly adhered to established standards for equipment, personnel, and doctrinal alignment; they were used for doctrinal experimentation and tactical demonstrations for military schools.

The divisions were incomplete and understrength. While they could have served as a skeletal framework—to be fleshed out during wartime through the mobilization of reservists—it would have been difficult to secure the necessary sergeants, officers, and weaponry. The DIs possessed only 53% of their authorized infantry battalions, and with an actual strength of around 5,500 enlisted personnel, they were closer in size to brigades. The Airborne Division was not even the size of a brigade. The Armored Division lacked both a heavy battalion and its artillery component. The Cavalry Divisions were dysfunctional hybrids, combining horse-mounted, motorized, and mechanized elements.

Furthermore, the organizational structure was outdated, blending major commands established under French influence during the 1920s and 1930s with newer, American-influenced units. Meanwhile, Western armies abroad were moving toward more flexible divisional structures. In the 1960s, the United States Army abolished regiments, placing nine to eleven battalions under each division—which could be grouped into three brigade commands—while the French Army abolished both the brigade and the battalion, placing four regiments (each only slightly larger than a battalion) under each division. Brazil ended its divisional regimental system and, drawing inspiration from the British Army, established a new brigade-based system.

Under the 1970 Master Plan, the brigade became the new primary large operational unit, possessing operational autonomy and defined by its branch (infantry or cavalry) and function. Infantry brigades were formed from existing infantry divisions, the former air-mobile/airborne division, other major tactical units, and various new, purpose-built formations. Cavalry brigades were derived from the existing cavalry divisions and the armored division. These brigades were coordinated by Army Divisions, which were created through the transformation of the former infantry divisions. While the composition of the brigades was standardized, the divisions varied in their brigade makeup. Each division included a fixed "divisional base", consisting of a Divisional Artillery unit—equipped with anti-aircraft artillery and 155mm howitzers (whereas brigades were equipped with 105mm howitzers)—along with a mechanized cavalry regiment (RC Mec), a combat engineer battalion (BE Cmb), a divisional communications battalion, an Army Police company, and a headquarters company. Some of these components were missing from certain divisions, and there were inconsistencies across the various divisional artillery units.

Each brigade comprised three to four maneuver units at the battalion level, as well as a mechanized cavalry squadron tasked with reconnaissance and security. Infantry brigades—whether generic, motorized, airborne, or jungle-warfare oriented—consisted of three infantry battalions of their respective type. The Mechanized Cavalry Brigade consisted of one Mechanized Cavalry Regiment (RCB) and two Mechanized Cavalry Regiments; it was the only one that lacked a Mechanized Cavalry Squadron. The Armored Infantry Brigade comprised one Armored Cavalry Regiment and two Armored Infantry Battalions for primary operations, along with one Motorized Infantry Battalion tasked with eliminating any remaining enemy pockets. The Armored Cavalry Brigade was structured similarly to the Armored Infantry Brigade, but with two Armored Cavalry Regiments (RCC), one Armored Infantry Battalion (BIB), and no Motorized Infantry Battalion (BI Mtz).

These brigades also possessed the combat and logistical support necessary for their operational autonomy. While there were some variations between the brigades, this support generally included a Field Artillery Group, a Logistics Battalion, an anti-aircraft battery, an engineer company, a Communications Company (to provide command and control for the brigade headquarters), a Command Company (to operate the headquarters itself), and an Army Police platoon (to manage traffic and escort prisoners of war). The armored, mechanized, and paratrooper brigades were given priority and were nearly fully staffed, whereas other infantry brigades—particularly those in the jungle—lacked certain supporting units for their infantry. The brigade-based system was fully implemented by December 1980 and remained in effect into the early 21st century.

== Major Commands ==
Since 1956, the national territory had been divided into six major area commands: four Armies—headquartered in Rio de Janeiro, São Paulo, Porto Alegre, and Recife, respectively—and two Military Commands (for Brasília and the Amazon). Each commanded divisions, smaller units, and some of the twelve Military Regions, which held administrative and territorial responsibilities. In 1960, three Infantry Divisions of lower priority were commanded jointly with the Military Regions bearing the same number (the 4th, 5th, and 7th). By 1980, this arrangement applied to the 5th, 7th, and 9th. The four Armies were led by four-star generals (generais-de-exército), while the two Military Commands were led by two-star generals (generais-de-divisão). The concept was that these major area commands would form field armies, but budgetary and structural conditions never allowed for this. This arrangement remained in place until 1985, when they were replaced by seven Military Commands.

These commands constituted the ground force, which—along with advisory bodies, general management, and sectoral directorates—was grouped under the Ministry of the Army (the name adopted by the Ministry of War after 1967).

The First and Third Armies held the largest forces. In Rio de Janeiro, this was an anachronism—a legacy from when the city served as the national capital—while on the southern border, it reflected historical conflicts in the Río de la Plata region and lingering tensions with Argentina. The restructuring that began in 1971 did little to alter this landscape, even as the inland expansion of development continued at the time. Several barracks were established far from the coastal strip, keeping pace with demographic expansion. Concern grew regarding the integration of the Amazon, leading to the creation of the Jungle Warfare Training Center in 1964, the relocation of the Amazon Military Command from Belém to Manaus in 1969, and the organization of Jungle Infantry Battalions—a uniquely Brazilian type of unit—along with two jungle brigades. As of 1985, the Amazon region still had only a few, insufficient military units.

== See also ==
- Armed struggle against the Brazilian military dictatorship
- Reorganization of the Brazilian Army in the Old Republic
