= Fort of São Pedro =

- Forte de São Pedro
- Lisbon, Greater Lisbon, Lisbon in Portugal
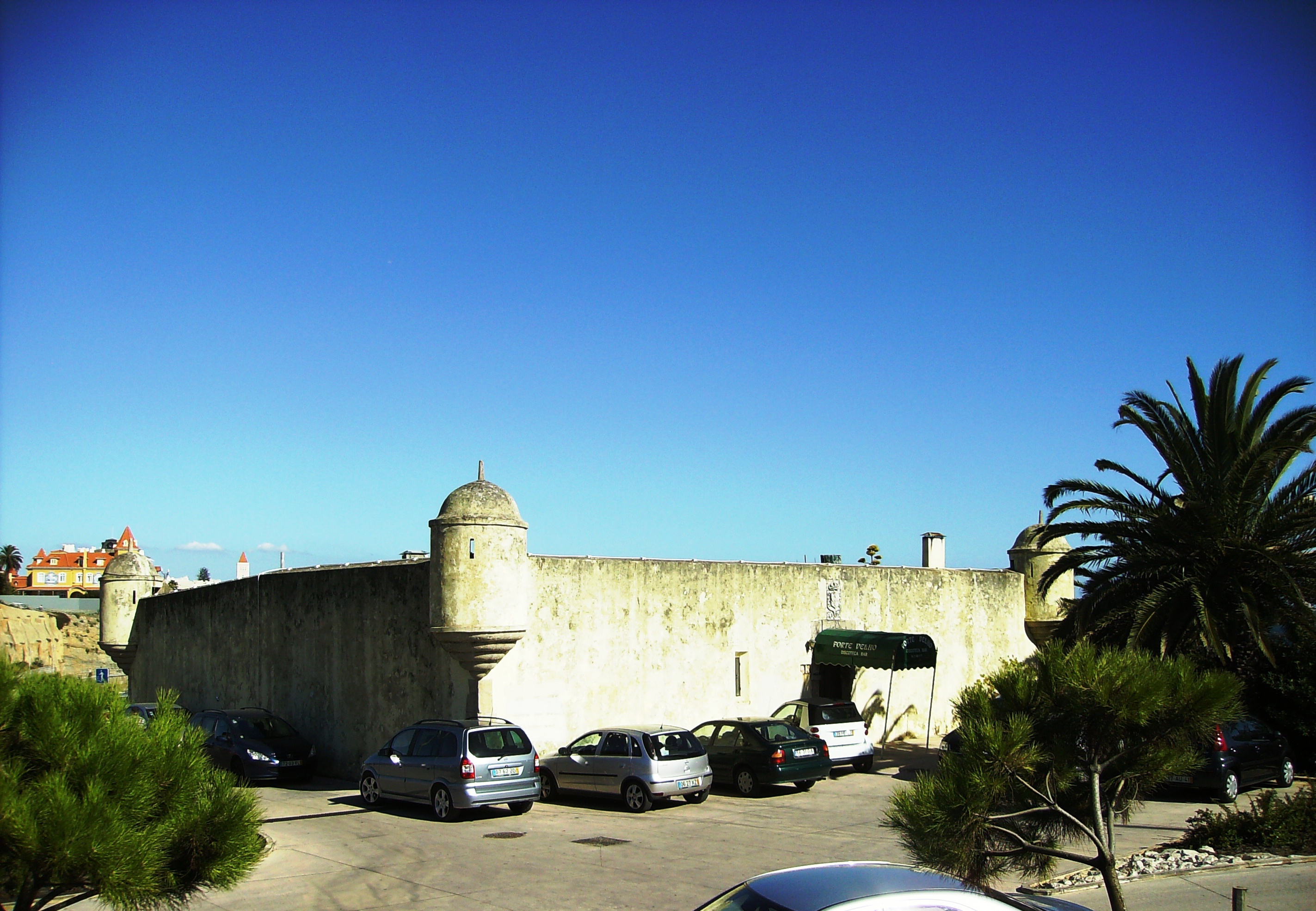

Site information
- Type: Fort
- Owner: Portuguese Republic
- Operator: Empresa Forte Velho
- Open to the public: Private

Location
- Coordinates: 38°42′8.12″N 9°23′35.84″W

Site history
- Built: fl. 1642
- Materials: Masonry, Limestone

The Fort of São Pedro, also known as the Fort of Poça, is a medieval fortification, along the coast of the civil parish of Estoril, in the municipality of Cascais. Situated on the beach of Poça, the Fort was part of a group of fortifications during the Joanino era of Portuguese monarchs, built between 1642 and 1648 to form a defensive line between the Fort of São Julião da Barra and Cabo da Roca.

== History ==
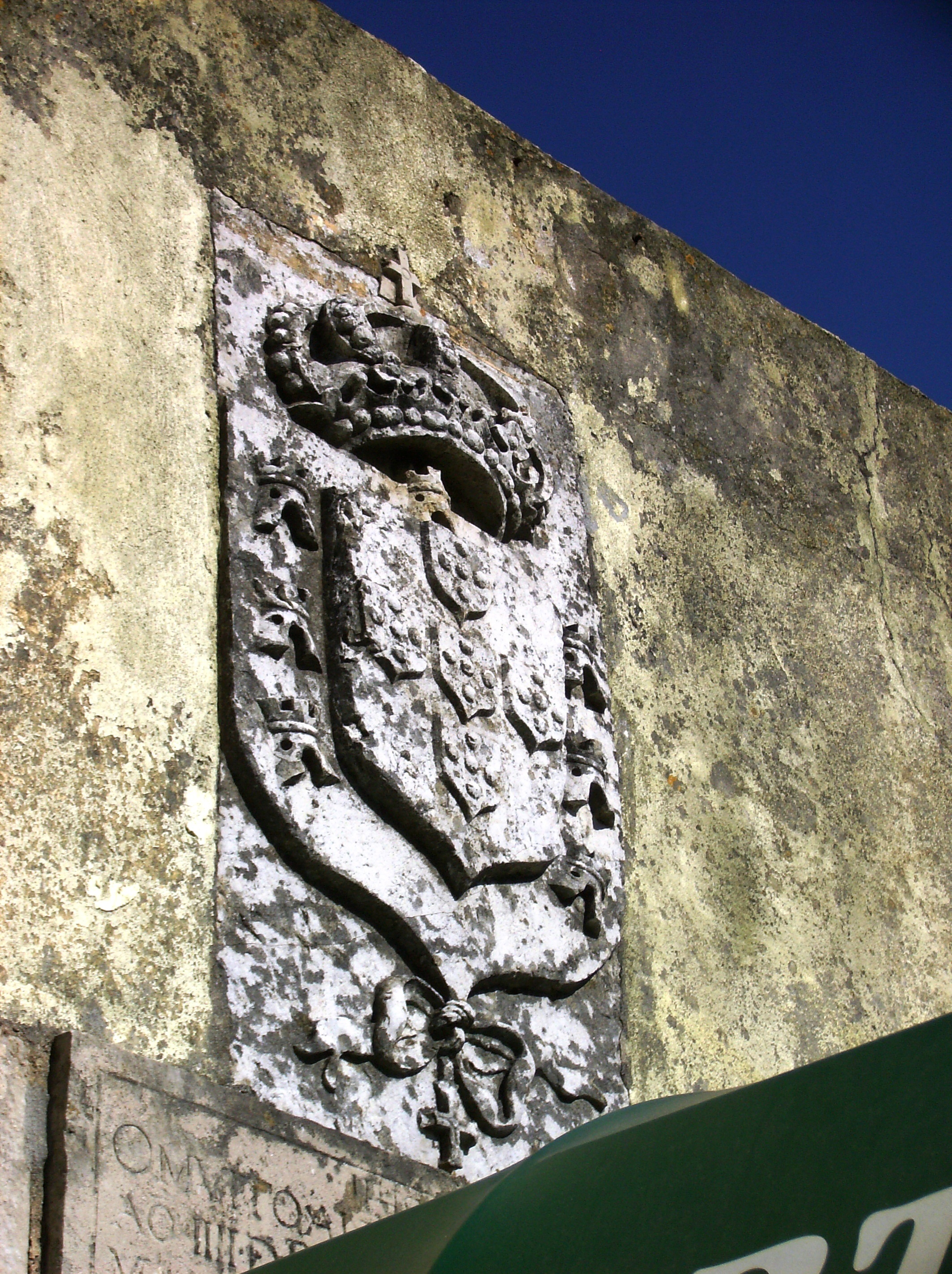
The coat-of-arms of the historical portal of the Fort of São Pedro

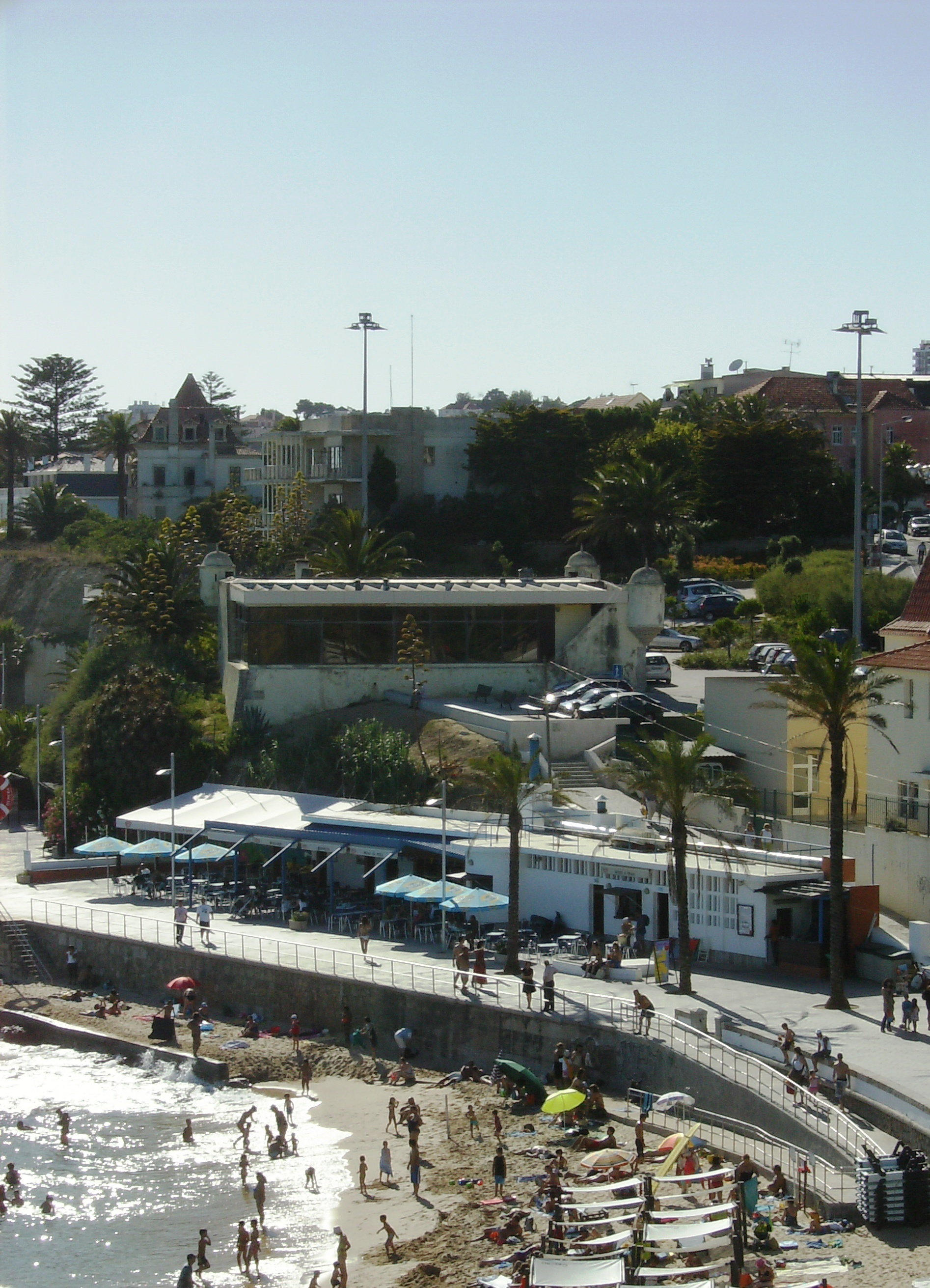
The urban context of the fort today, hidden in the modern structures of Estoril

The fort was begun on 5 April 1642 (from an inscription over the portico), and completed in 1643, initially named Forte de São Teodósio (Fort of Saint Theodosius), under the supervision of António Luís de Meneses, governor of the Fort of Cascais. It was likely named in honor of the first male heir of King John IV of Portugal. This first plan of the fort was elaborated by architect Mateus do Couto, at which time it was referred to as Forte de Santo António da Cruz da Assubida. During the 17th century, the port consisted of a long battlement, where the artillery was organized towards the east and southern facades. Along the western wall, oriented toward the land, were barracks. In the middle of the building was the main gate, where the intermediary courtyard allowed access to many of the fort's spaces: to the left, the first division served as quarters and kitchen, and in front, the main battery emplacement; from an eight-degree staircase along the guardhouse wall, troops could access to the a floor over the quarters, which was used by the fusiliers; and the angular parapets, along the northern and western orientations of the fort, which acted as the main defensive battery.

In the 18th century it began being referred to as Forte de São Pedro (Fort of Saint Peter). In 1720, the fortification was commanded by commander José Martins, who lived onsite, but without permanent garrison. Shortly later, it was encountered closed and with need of some public work, namely the walls, chimney in the guard post, a new door for the warehouse and gunpowder magazine (all budgeted at 70,000 réis). Its artillery included two iron cannons, which served the purpose, but were nonoperational due to their lack of repair/maintenance, gunpowder and mechanisms.

By 1735, there were already three cannons, but still incapable of meeting its needs, and needing "total repair". In 1751, its degradation was accentuated, and needed approximately 200,000 réis worth of repairs. The trench that linked to the fort was in ruins, while the walls required 230,000 réis worth of reconstruction.

In the third quarter of the 18th century (1831 specifically), the fort was considerably ruined, without a garrison or artillery.

The first recorded intervention occurred on 22 May 1831, consisting of repairs to the ruined parapets of the battlements, all the walls and bartizans, the magazine, warehouse and quarters. This also included the reconstruction of the parapets of the covered walkway, the esplanade, the application of a new main gate and the several interventions in the windows, as well as the coat-of-arms over the main portico, which was chipped away in the "time of the French government intrusion". These projects began in July and persisted until November, although one barrier was never concluded, allowing the re-garrisoning of the troops. On 17 February 1832, a report by Field Marshal Gabriel António Franco de Castro, then inspector of the fortifications of the north Tagus district, referred to the uncompleted renovations at São Pedro in the following terms: "the Fort began to reform when the removed the artisans, without finishing the concert". On site, supposedly, the materials to complete the projects remained, and the field marshal urged that the military to complete the unfinished project.

On 1 May 1832, the fort was garrisoned by seven corporals, soldiers of the militia and two veterans, under the authority of a military governor, while the structure included two cannons (of 12 and 18 caliber).

On 15 February 1843, the fort was ceded to the Misericórdia de Cascais, who intended to use the structure as a support facility for the thermal baths of the beach of Poça. In 1854, the fort consisted of a battery of 66 centimetres (26 in) height and 110 centimetres (43 in) width, with the eastern platform1,540 centimetres (610 in) length, and the southern 704 centimetres (277 in) in length. The powder magazine and house were to the left of the barracks, which could accommodate twelve: all spaces were vaulted and lacked doors. On 28 November 1892, lieutenant Jorge Guedes Gavicho wrote that a line for fusiliers connected the Fort of São Pedro and Fort of São João by trench along the coast, arching over the Ribeira da Cadaveira, noting that"they could see vestiges, that continued to descend towards the other margin, forming a junction with the fort of São Pedro...Of this entrenchment [there] could be seen, general outlines and remains of masonry, which formed slopes and bunks for fusiliers."

The concession was transferred to the company Empresa dos Banhos da Poça at the beginning of 1894. Shortly later, during the construction of the new building for the thermal baths and gardens, the fusillade that linked the Fort of São Pedro, with the Fort of São João, was destroyed.

By the beginning of the 20th century, the Supreme Administrative Court (Portuguese: Supremo Tribunal Administrativo) annulled the rental to the Empresa dos Banhos on 4 July 1924. The space was later rented to the Direcção de Assistência do Ministério do Interior (Division for Assistance of the Ministry of the Interior), in order to stall animal shelter on 19 September 1931. But, it wasn't until 1935, that the rest of the objects and utensils of the former Empresa dos Banhos were transferred to the former concession.

Following its devolution, there were successive applications to the Ministry of the Interior to rent or transfer of control by various institutions. On 29 April 1940, the space was ceded to the Junta Autónoma das Estradas, among others. It was followed in 1947 (15 July) transferred to Junta de Turismo de Cascais, in order for the installation of a tea-house. This new concession was inaugurated in 1954, after an extensive remodeling was completed (maintaining its historical features and only imposing three lateral cracks in the lateral walls). In 1957, the fort was re-rented and transformed into a bar-restaurant (which resulted in various transformations and expansions). This renter eventually undertook an expansion in 1972, but was impeded on May 17 by the Comissão Municipal de Arte e Arqueologia de Cascais (Municipal Commission for Art and Archaeology), which indicated that the changes to the fort should respect "the exterior sight-line and [architecture] of the primitive Fort". Later, the space of the old battery and quarters were adapted for the opening of a discothèque.

== Architecture ==
The Fort of São Pedro is located within an urban context, on a physical platform consisting of a flattened hilltop on the western slope of the Praia da Poça. It is situated along the right margin of the Ribeira da Cadaveira (Cadaveira Ravine), where in the past there existed thermal baths, and where today resides a convent school. In front of this fort, and within close proximity, is the Fort of São João.

It is a small fort, designed in a simple rectangular model with battlements facing the coast, while the vaulted strong-house sits close to the entrance. This strong-house is subdivided into four compartments, overlaid by a terrace used for the defence and firing line of fusiliers. Cylindrical bartizans, with staggered bases and spherical openings are located at the corners of the fort. The facade is marked by a simple arched portico, surmounted by an inscription to the fort's early history, including the coat-of-arms of Portugal, with crown and crest and crack on its left-side.
