= Napoleon Collins =

American Navy officer

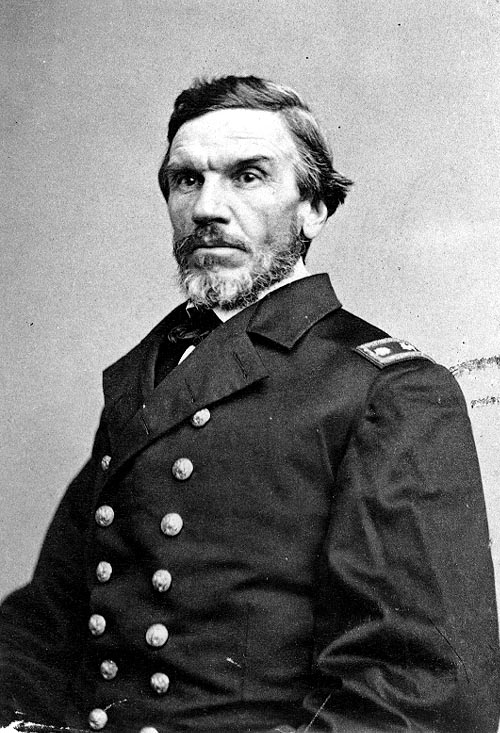
- Commander Collins, USN, circa 1864
- Born: March 4, 1814; Pennsylvania, U.S.
- Died: August 9, 1875 (aged 61); Lima, Peru
- Military career
- Allegiance: United States of America
- Branch: United States Navy
- Service years: 1834–1875
- Rank: Rear admiral
- Commands: Unadilla; Octorara; Anacostia; Wachusett; South Pacific Squadron
- Conflicts: Mexican–American War; American Civil War: Bahia Incident

Rear Admiral Napoleon Collins (4 March 1814 – 9 August 1875) served in the United States Navy during the Mexican–American War and the American Civil War.

== Biography ==
Collins was born in Pennsylvania. He became a midshipman in the United States Navy in January 1834. Promoted to the rank of lieutenant in 1846, he took an active role in the war with Mexico. During the first years of the Civil War, he commanded several gunboats and attained the rank of commander in July 1862.

On 7 October 1864, while in command of the screw sloop Wachusett, Collins took his ship into a neutral harbor and captured the Confederate cruiser CSS Florida, sparking a minor diplomatic crisis between the United States and the Empire of Brazil. The Florida was ultimately towed to sea and taken to the United States.

Court-martialled for this illegal undertaking, Commander Collins was sentenced to be dismissed. However, since his seizure of Florida was both militarily effective and popularly acclaimed in the Northern states, the sentence was not carried out.

Napoleon Collins remained active in the post-war Navy, reaching the ranks of captain in July 1866 and rear admiral in August 1874. On 9 August 1875, while in command of the South Pacific Squadron, he died at Lima, Peru.
