= São Marcelo Fort =

- Forte de Nossa Senhora do Pópulo e São Marcelo
- Salvador, Bahia in Brazil
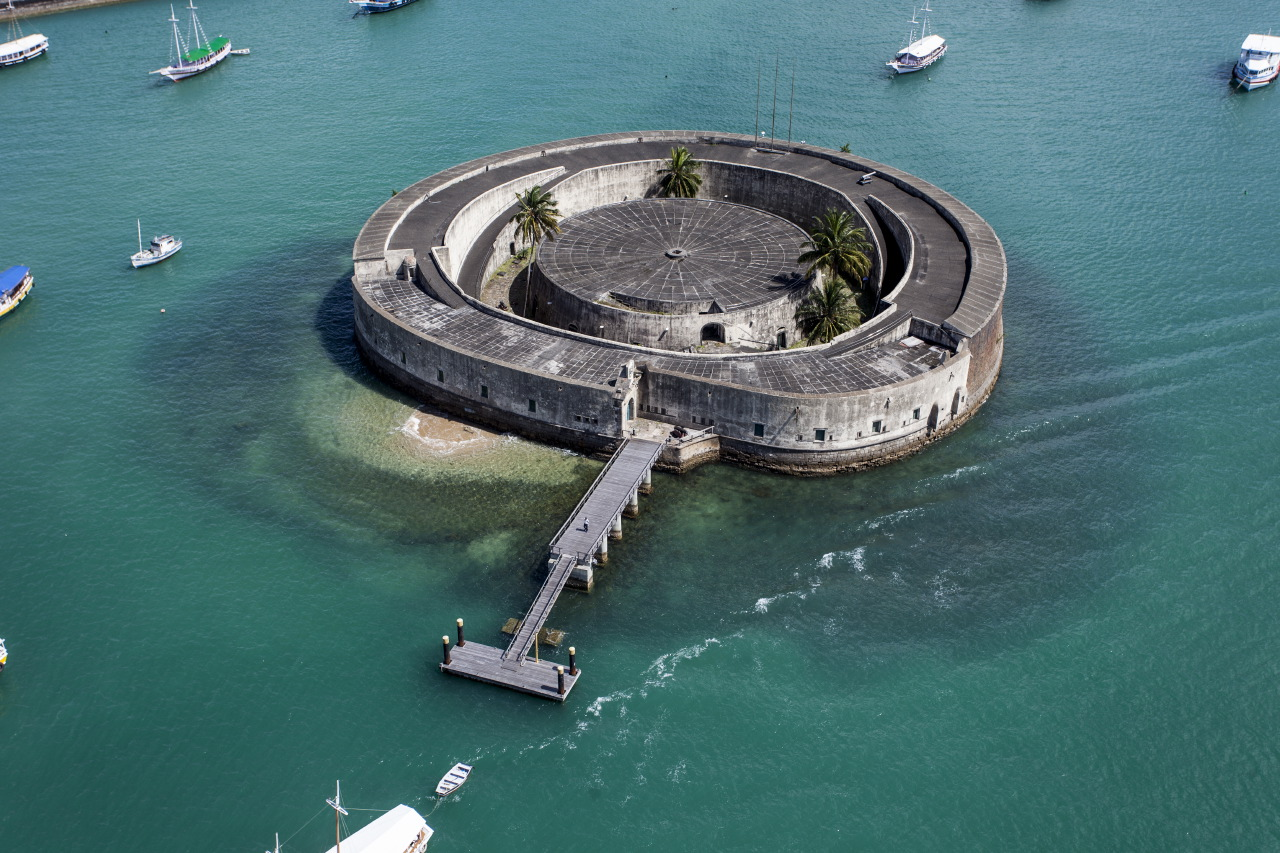
- Aerial view of São Marcelo Fort

Site information
- Type: Fort
- Open to the public: Yes
- Condition: Good

Location
- São Marcelo Fort
- Coordinates: 12.9712°S 38.517778°W

Site history
- Built: 1608–1623

National Historic Heritage of Brazil
- Designated: 1938
- Reference no.: 155

São Marcelo Fort (Portuguese: Forte São Marcelo), also known as Forte de Nossa Senhora do Pópulo e São Marcelo or Forte do Mar, is located in Salvador in Bahia, Brazil. It is located in small bit of land off the coast in the Baía de Todos os Santos. Standing on a small bank of reefs about 300 metres (980 ft) from the coast, it is one of two forts separated by water from land in Brazil, the other being the Fort Tamandaré da Laje Tamandaré in Rio de Janeiro. It is the only cylindrical fort in Brazil. Its design follows those of Castel Sant'Angelo in Italy and São Lourenço do Bugio Fort in Portugal. It is popularly known as the "Forte do Mar" (Fort of the Sea). It was built to protect the important port city Salvador from threats; the city had the largest number of forts during the colonial period of Brazil.

== History ==
The fort was designed and construction started in 1608 under Francisco Frias Mosque. The first documentary evidence of the fort is in a city plan of Salvador title Planta da Cidade do Salvador, na Baía de Todos os Santos, which dates to 1616. The fort was completed in 1623 during the rule of Governor General Diogo de Mendonça Furtado; it was constructed entirely of wood with 19 artillery pieces of various calibers.

The fort was a primary target of the Dutch in 1624 during the Capture of Bahia. It was the first space in Bahia occupied by the Dutch, who used it as a base to fire on the city. Incendiary bullets were launched from the fort to the city center of Salvador, which facilitated the capture of the city. Bahia returned to the Portuguese as part of the Recapture of Bahia 1625, but the region remained under attack during the Dutch rule of Northeast Brazil from 1630 to 1654. The fort played a decisive role in defending Bahia during an attempted invasion by Count Johan Maurits van Nassau-Siegen (1604-1679) between April and May, 1638.

A reconstruction of the fort was ordered in 1650 by Governor-General João Rodrigues de Vasconcelos e Sousa (1649-1654) after the Portuguese Restoration War. This period of building saw the construction of a turret at the highest point of the sand bar; it stands at 15 metres (49 ft). A further reconstruction in 1728 saw the appearance of a wall around the perimeter of the fort. By 1759 it was reported to have 54 protective plates of bronze and iron. It became part of a string of forts protecting the south of Salvador; the São Marcelo fort was placed between the Small Fort of Our Lady of Monserrate to the north and the Fort of Saint Peter and the São Paulo da Gamboa Battery to the south.

The fort served as a political prison in the 19th century. It held members of a local republican rebellion movement, the Federation of the Guanais, also known as the Revolt of the Guanais, in 1833. It later held Bento Gonçalves (1788-1847), a rebel leader of the Ragamuffin War. Gonçalves was transferred to the fort on August 26, 1837, but escaped a month later. Gonçalves spent time after his imprisonment at the fort in Salvador and Itaparica Island. The fort then held members of the Sabinada (1837–1838), a Bahian revolt that called for the abolition of slavery and the redistribution of land. Approximately 200 participants of the Malê revolt, a slave revolt of 1835, were held at the fort until their trial. The enslaved Africans and freedmen were subsequently executed, tortured, or deported to Africa.

=== In popular culture ===
In 2008, the location served as the first pit stop of the 13th season of the American installment of The Amazing Race.

== Protected status ==
The São Marcelo Fort was listed as a historic structure by the National Institute of Historic and Artistic Heritage (IPHAN) in 1938. The structure was registered under the Book of Historical Works, Inscription 49 and Book of Fine Arts, Inscription 273-A. The directive is dated May 24, 1938.

== Access ==
The fort is closed to the public due to construction works. It opened to the public in 2006 after a long period of restoration, but closed again in 2018.

== Gallery ==
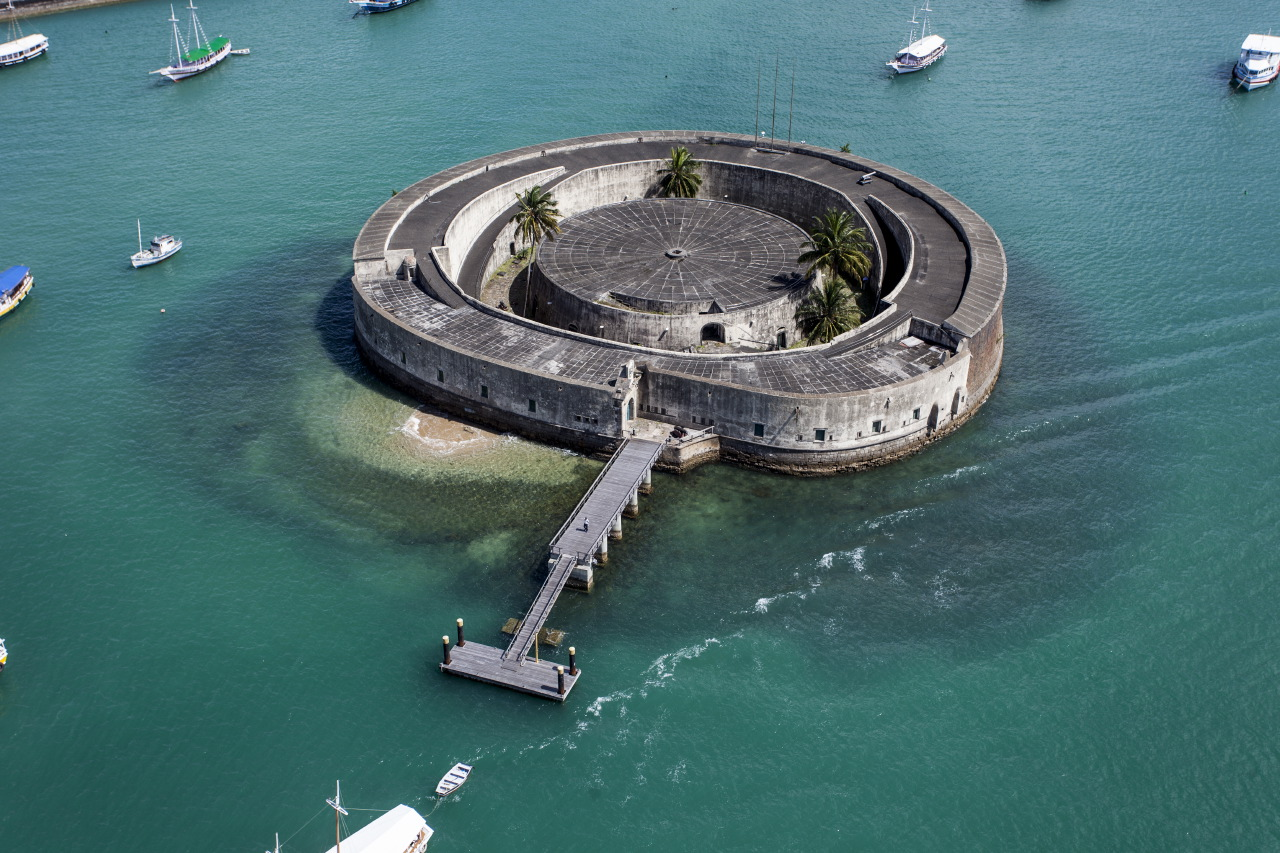
Aerial View of the Fort

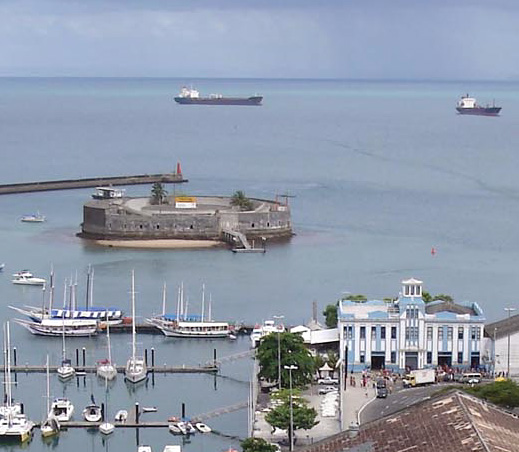
Fort View

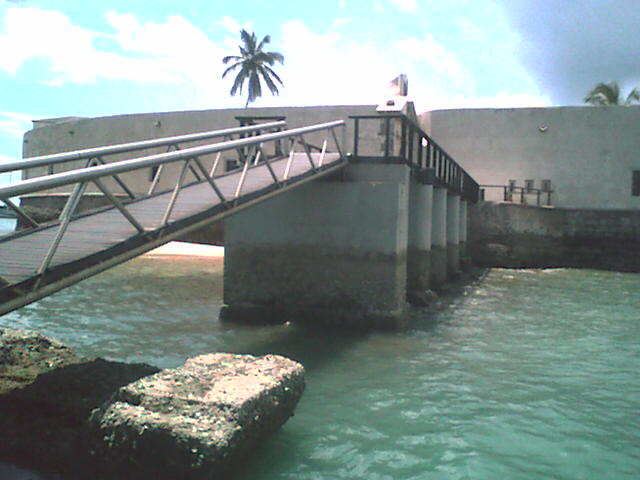
Entrance to the Fort

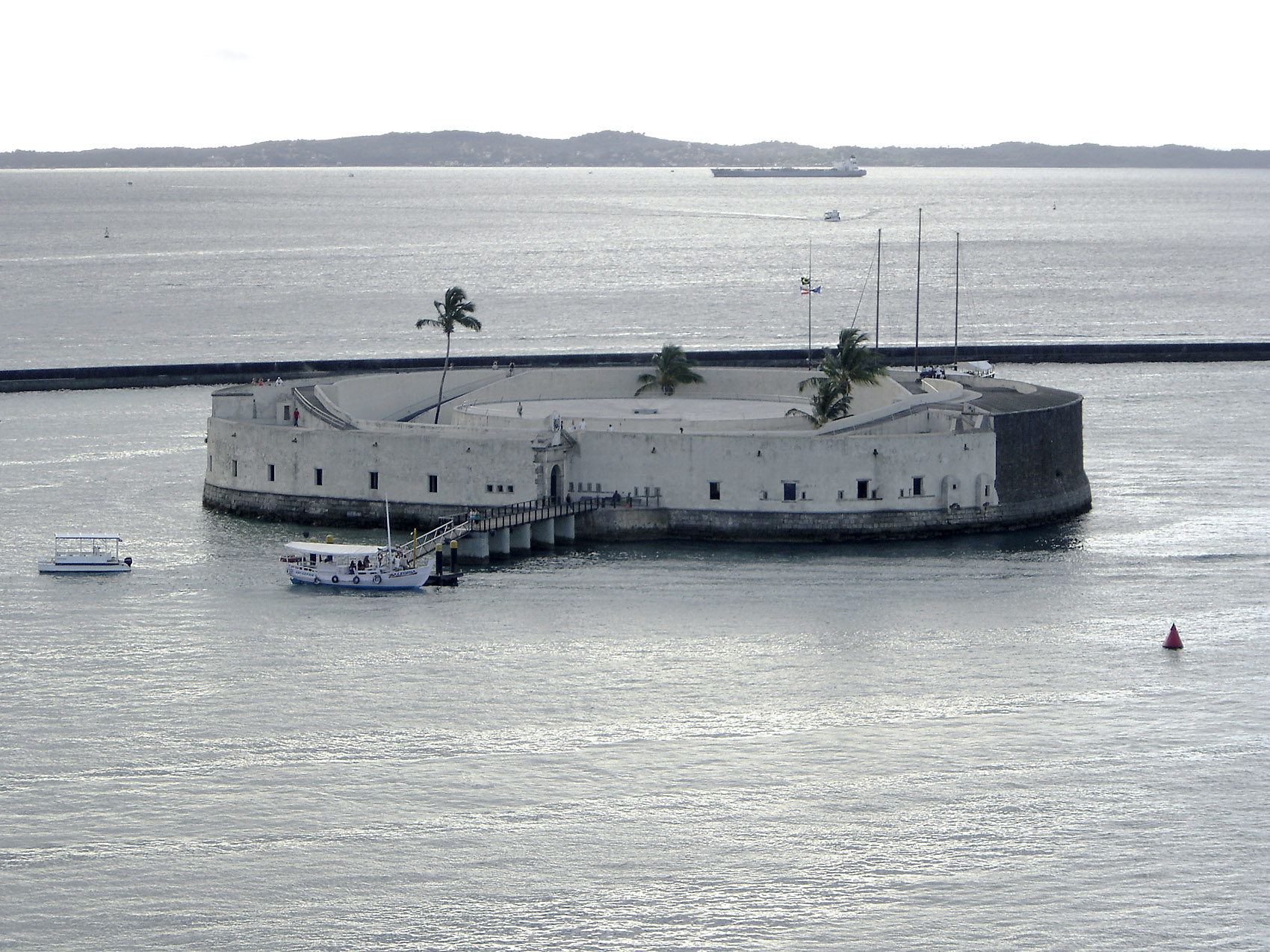
Fort viewed from the Sea

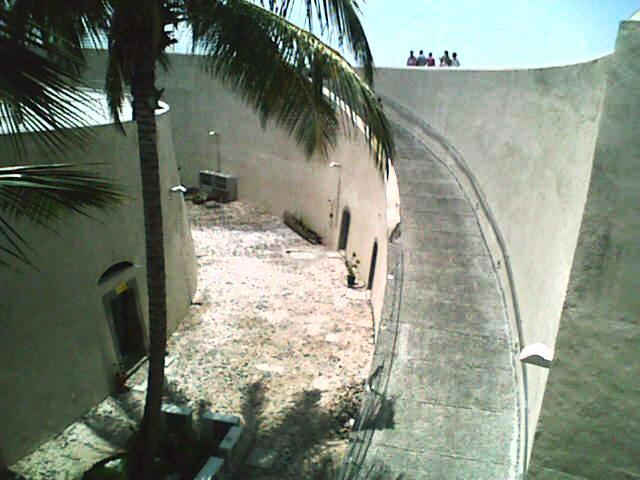
Inside the Fort
