= Forte de Santa Maria =

- Salvador, Bahia in Brazil
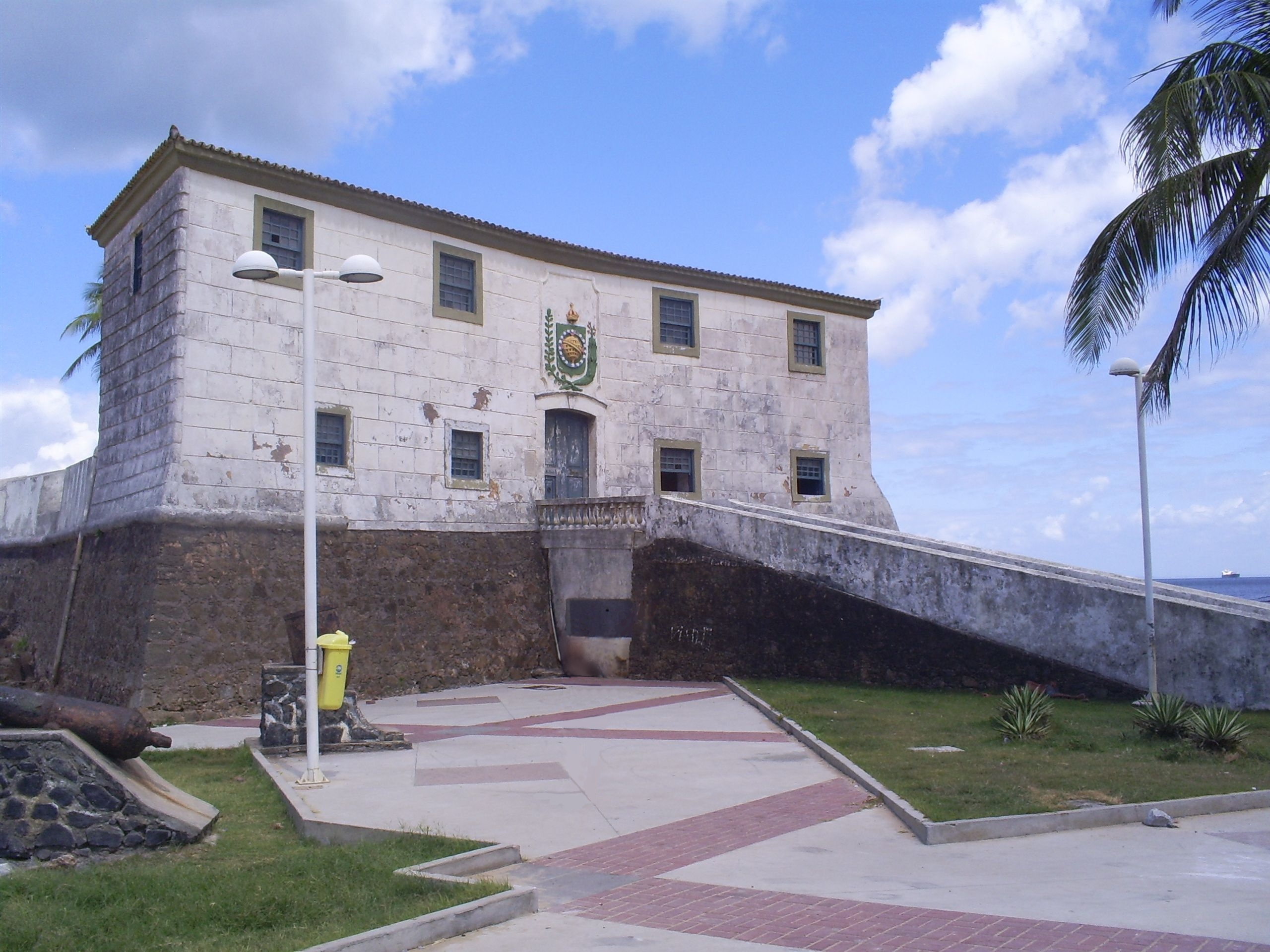
- View of exterior of fort

Site information
- Type: Fort

Location
- Location of Forte de Santa Maria in Brazil
- Coordinates: 13.004483°S 38.533819°W

National Historic Heritage of Brazil
- Designated: 1938
- Reference no.: 155

Forte de Santa Maria (Portuguese: Fort of Saint Mary) is a fort located in Salvador, Bahia in Brazil. It is also known as the Fortim de Santa Maria (Portuguese: Small Fort of Saint Mary). It retains much of its original structure of the 17th century, including its broad, stone curtain walls. The fort is in the shape of a heptagon and is accessed via a narrow embankment. The fort was listed as a historic structure by the National Institute of Historic and Artistic Heritage (IPHAN) in 1938. It is closed to the public, is not maintained by federal or state institutions and is falling into a state of disrepair.

== Ownership and abandonment ==
Under Article 20 of the Constitution of Brazil of 1988 the Forte de Santa Maria is classified as a military installation and owned by the Armed Forces of Brazil. It, as well as ten other forts in Salvador, are assets of the Secretariat of Patrimony of the Union (SPU) (Portuguese: Secretaria do Patrimônio da União in Bahia. The Brazilian Navy transferred the fort to the SPU in 2001. The SPU stated in 2020 that it is unable to maintain the fort; it has remained closed to the public since 2001. Lacking any maintenance, the walls of the fort are both damaged and unpainted. An NGO was established to manage the fort, but the venture proved unsuccessful. The SPU hopes to return the fort to the Brazilian Navy.

== Protected status ==
The São Paulo da Gamboa Battery was listed as a historic structure by the National Institute of Historic and Artistic Heritage (IPHAN) in 1938.

== Condition and access ==
The Forte de Santa Maria is not open to the public and may not be visited.

== See also ==
- Military history of Brazil
