= List of bastion forts =

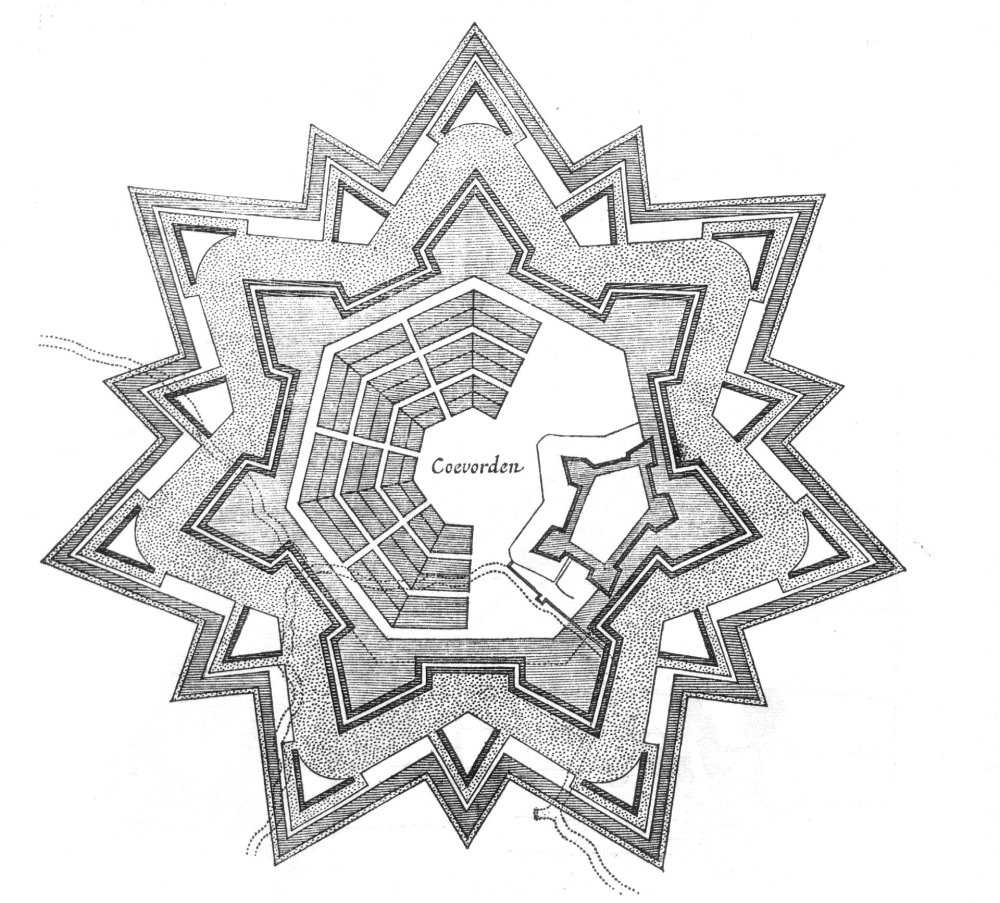
A 17th-century plan of the fortress town of Coevorden in the Netherlands

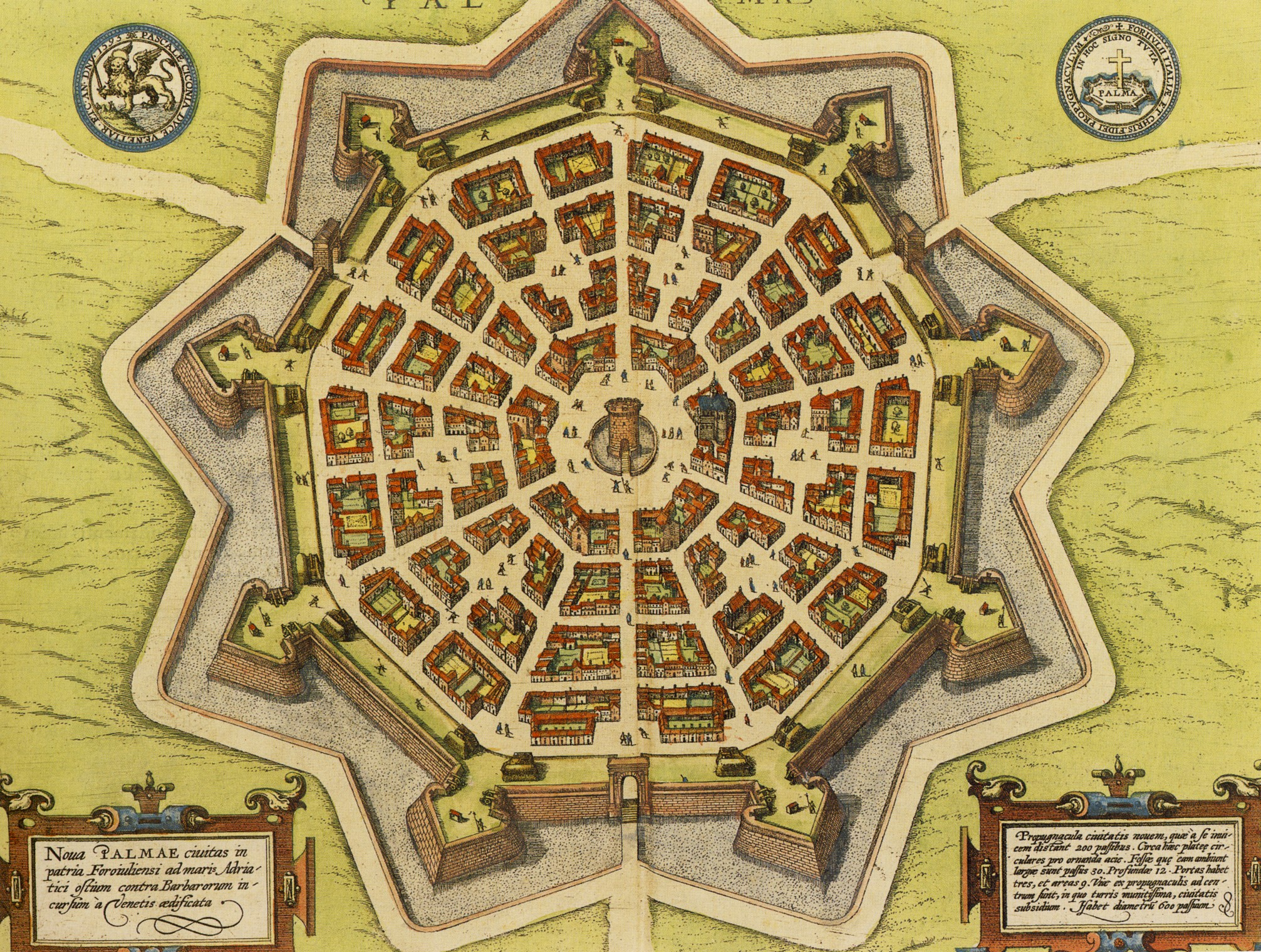
Map of Palmanova in 1593. The town is encircled by massive Venetian defensive systems that are a UNESCO World Heritage Site since 9 July 2017.

This is a list of bastion forts.

== Angola ==
- Fortaleza de São Miguel, Luanda
- Fort Nossa Senhora da Vitória
- Fort São Pedro da Barra
- Fortress of Muxima
- Fortress of Kambambe
- Fort São Filipe
- Fort São Francisco do Penedo
- Quicombo Fort
- Fort São José

== Antigua and Barbuda ==
- Fort James

== Austria ==
- Breitenbrunn am Neusiedler See parish church
- Bernstein im Burgenland Castle
- Bad Radkersburg Old Town
- Kufstein Fortress
- Fürstenfeld old town

== Bahrain ==
- Forte de Barém – also known as the Qal'at al-Bahrain

== Belarus ==
- Brest Fortress
- Nesvizh Castle
- Babruysk fortress

== Belgium ==
- Antwerp
- Liège Citadel
- Dendermonde
- Damme
- Huy Fort
- Ypres

== Benin ==
- São João Baptista

== Brazil ==
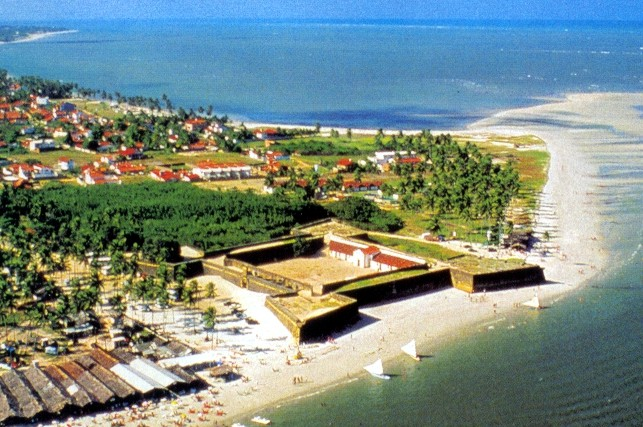
Fortaleza de Santa Cruz, Itamaracá

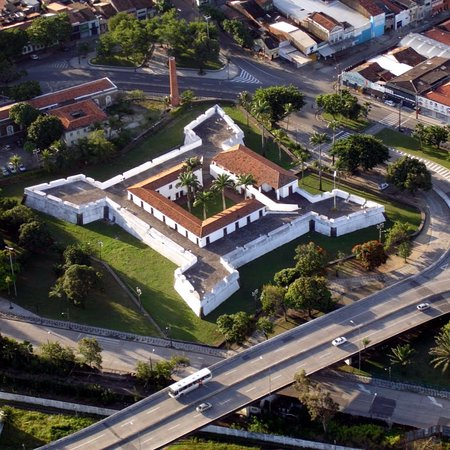
Forte das Cinco Pontas, Recife

- Fort Orange (Fortaleza de Santa Cruz), Ilha de Itamaracá, State of Pernambuco
- Forte de Tiago das Cinco Pontas, Recife, State of Pernambuco
- Forte de São João Batista do Brum, Recife, State of Pernambuco
- Fortaleza de São José de Macapá, Macapá, Amapá
- Forte do Presépio, Belém, Pará
- Forte Príncipe da Beira, in Costa Marques, Rondônia
- Fortaleza de Nossa Senhora da Assunção, Fortaleza, Ceará (only two bastions remain)
- Forte de Nossa Senhora dos Remédios, Fernando de Noronha, State of Pernambuco
- Fortaleza dos Reis Magos, Natal, Rio Grande do Norte
- Forte de Santa Catarina, Cabedelo, Paraíba
- Forte de Santo Inácio de Tamandaré, Tamandaré, State of Pernambuco
- Forte do Barbalho, Salvador, Bahia
- Forte de São Lourenço, Itaparica, Bahia
- Fortaleza de São João da Barra do Rio de Janeiro, Urca, Rio de Janeiro
- Forte de São Luís, Niterói, Rio de Janeiro
- Fortaleza de Santa Cruz da Barra, Niterói, Rio de Janeiro
- Forte Novo de Coimbra, Corumbá, Mato Grosso do Sul
- Fortaleza de Santa Cruz de Anhatomirim, Governador Celso Ramos, Santa Catarina
- Fortaleza de Santo Antônio de Ratones, Florianópolis, Santa Catarina
- Fortaleza de São José da Ponta Grossa, Florianópolis, Santa Catarina

== Canada ==
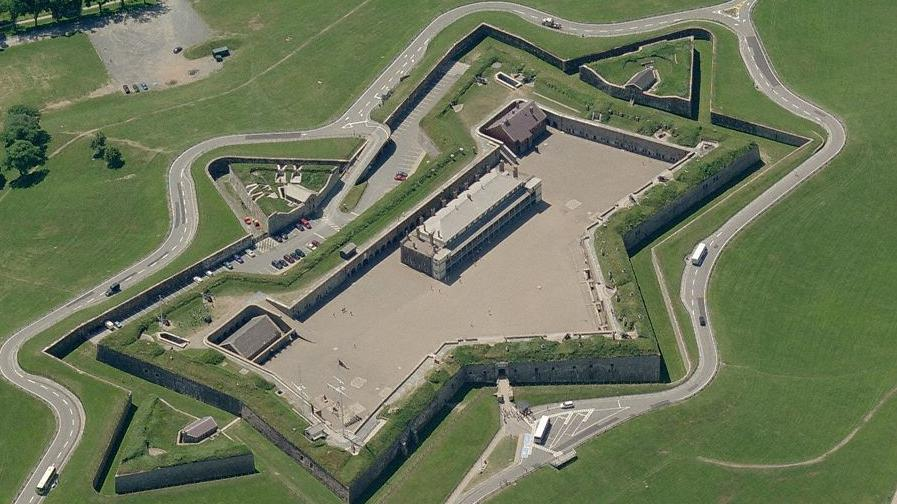
Fort George on Citadel Hill, Halifax, Nova Scotia

- Fort Anne, in Annapolis Royal, Nova Scotia
- Fort Beauséjour, in Aulac, New Brunswick
- Citadel of Quebec, in Quebec City, Quebec
- Fort George, Citadel Hill, in Halifax, Nova Scotia
- Fort George, in Niagara-on-the-Lake, Ontario
- Fort Mississauga, in Niagara-on-the-Lake, Ontario
- Fort Plaisance, Placentia, Newfoundland
- Fort Royal, Placentia, Newfoundland
- Fort Saint Louis, Placentia, Newfoundland
- Fort William, St. John's, Newfoundland
- Prince of Wales Fort, Churchill, Manitoba

== Cabo Verde ==
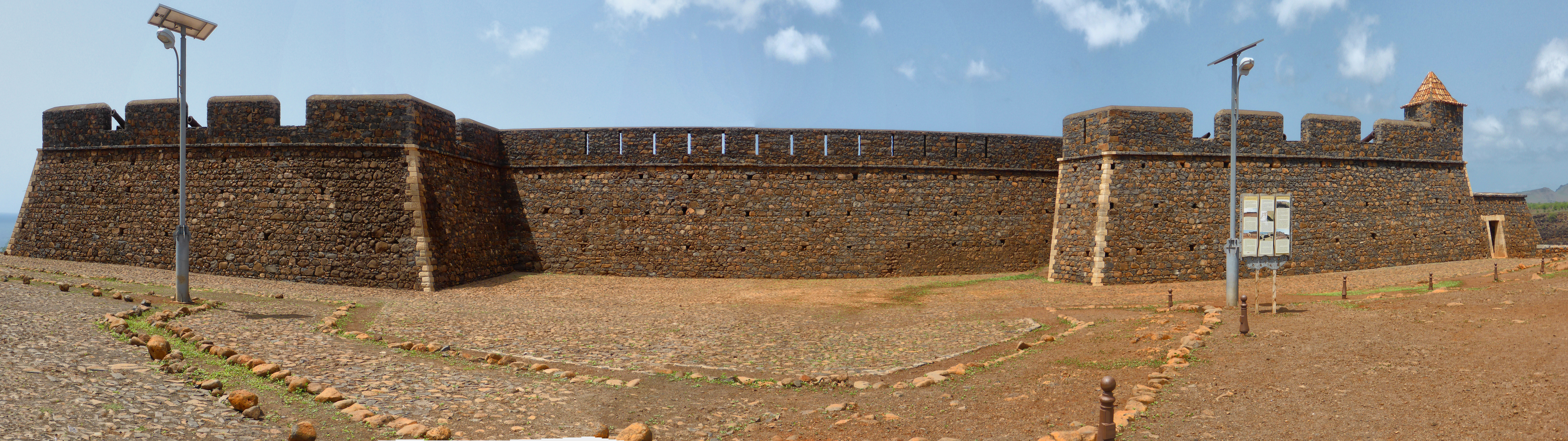
Fort São Filipe on Santiago Island

- D'El-Rei, São Vicente
- Duque de Bragança, Ilhéu de Sal Rei
- Principe Real, São Nicolau
- Real de São Filipe, Santiago
- São José, Maio

== China ==
- Forbidden city

Macau

- Dona Maria II
- Mong-Há
- Nossa Senhora do Monte
- Nossa Senhora da Guia
- Nossa Senhora do Bom Parto
- São Francisco
- São Tiago da Barra
- Taipa Fort

== Croatia ==
- Bilje - Savoy Castle, Bilje
- Čakovec - Čakovec Star Fort / Zrinski Castle
- Karlovac - Karlovac Star Fort
- Knin - Knin Fortress
- Osijek - Tvrđa
- Osijek - Catacombs Osijek / Tvrđavica Fortress
- Pula - Kaštel Fortress
- Pula - Fort Casoni Vecchi
- Pula - Fort Monvidal
- Senj - repurposed, now Senj Museum east of Velika Vrata
- Šibenik - St. Nicholas Fortress
- Šibenik - Barone Fortress
- St. John's Fortress, Šibenik
- St. Michael's Fortress, Šibenik
- Slavonski Brod - Brod Fortress
- Ston - Fort Kaštio
- Zadar - Bastions near Queen Jelena Madijevka Park

== Cuba ==
- Castillo San Salvador de la Punta, Havana
- Castillo de los Tres Reyes Magos del Morro, Havana
- Fortaleza de San Carlos de la Cabaña, Havana
- Castillo de la Real Fuerza, Havana
- Castillo del Príncipe, Havana (turned into a prison)
- Castillo de San Severino, Matanzas

== Cyprus ==
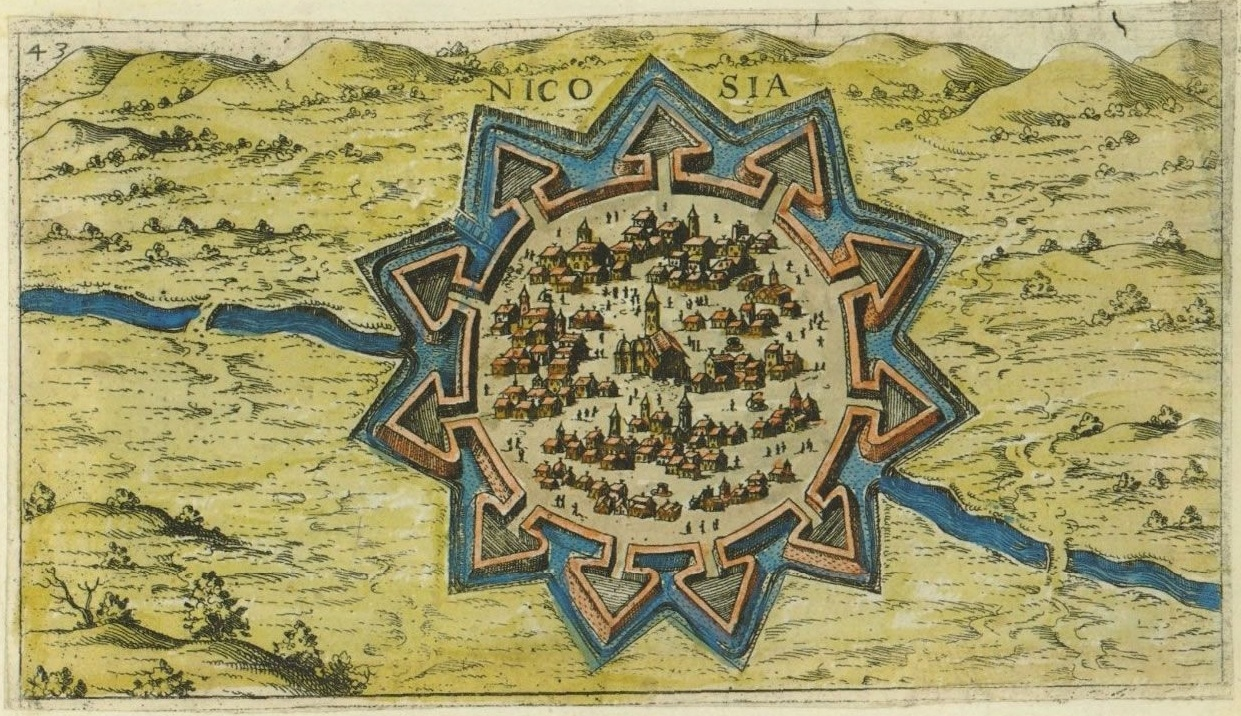
Map of Nicosia in Cyprus, created in 1597

- Venetian walls of Nicosia, Nicosia

== Czech Republic ==
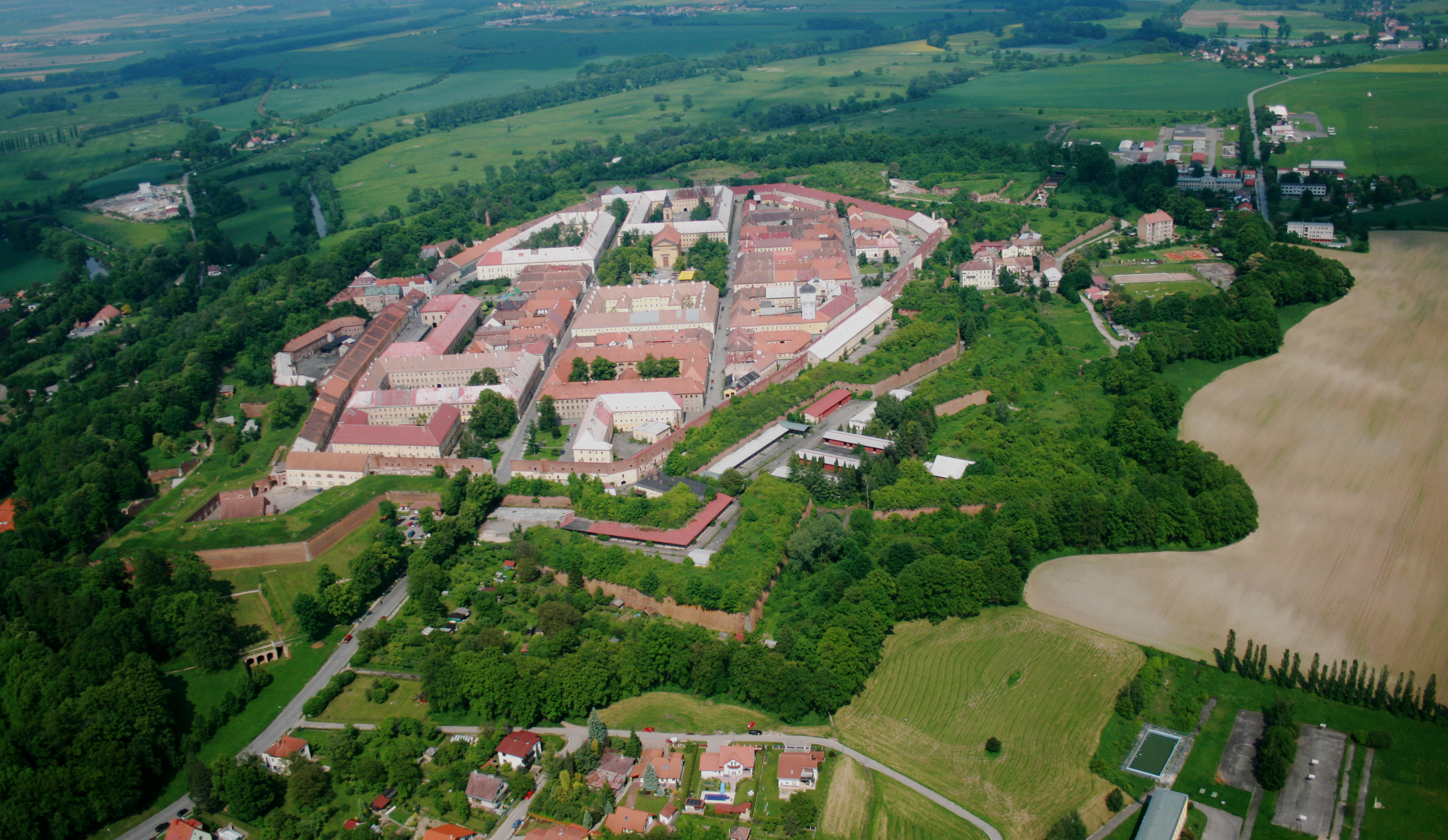
Josefov Fortress in Jaroměř

- Olomouc – in the 19th century most bastions were dismantled and the town was fortified by a system of outer forts, most of which are preserved
- Fortress Josefov – almost completely preserved, now part of Jaroměř
- Terezín – almost completely preserved
- Hradec Králové – dismantled in 1884, only small fractions of the fortifications are preserved
- Jablunkovské šance in Mosty u Jablunkova
- Hrad Špilberk, Brno, bastions of the city itself were dismantled
- Vyšehrad, Prague, large parts of bastions of the city in the north and west are also preserved

== Denmark ==
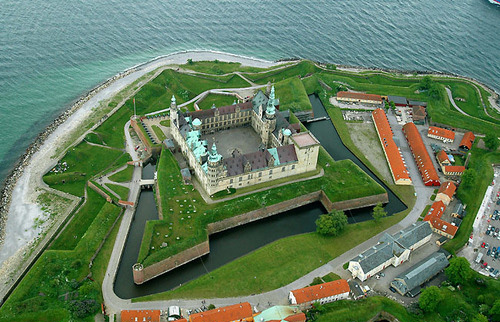
Kronborg Castle, Helsingør

- Copenhagen old town. Bastions are preserved around the eastern (Christianshavn) half of the city. The outline of some sections of the western half is preserved as a series of city parks
- Kastellet, Copenhagen
- Kronborg, Helsingør
- Fredericia, Jutland (ramparts of the old city)
- Nyborg Fortress, Nyborg (three bastions preserved)
- Rosenborg Castle, Copenhagen

== Estonia ==
- Kuressaare Castle
- Narva Old Town
- Tallinn Old Town
- Pärnu Vallikäär
- Tartu Tähetorn
- Paldiski Muula mäed

== Finland ==
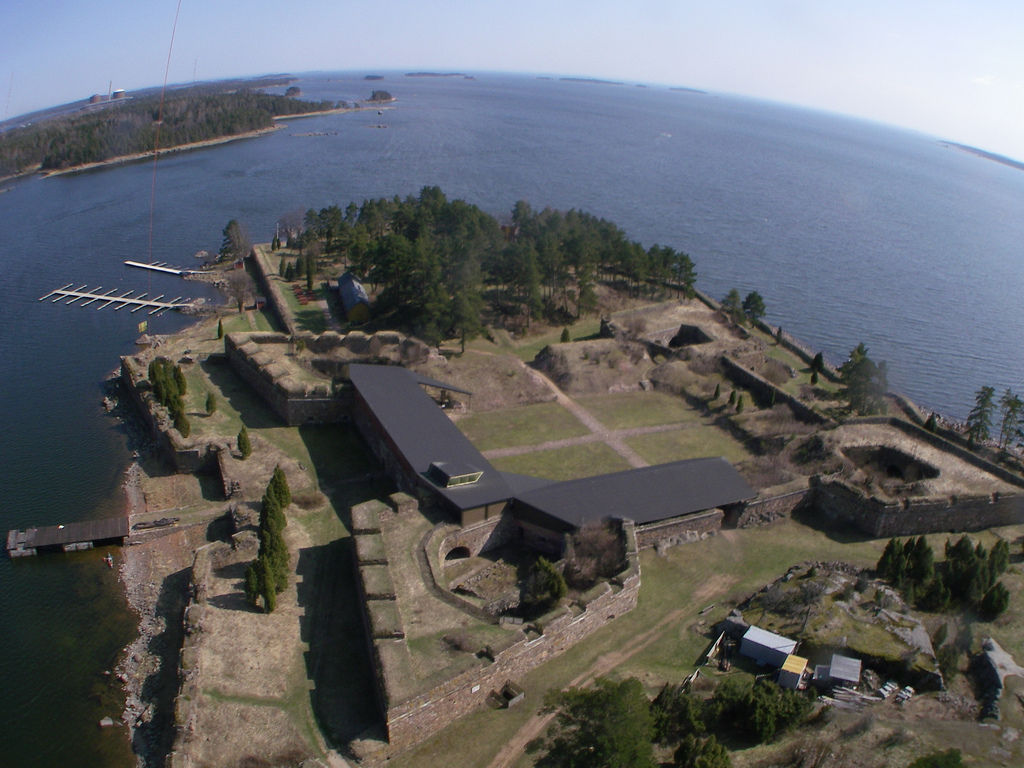
Svartholm from the air

- Hamina Fortress
- Häme Castle
- Kyminlinna
- Kärnäkoski Fortress
- Olavinlinna
- Suomenlinna
- Svartholm fortress

== France ==
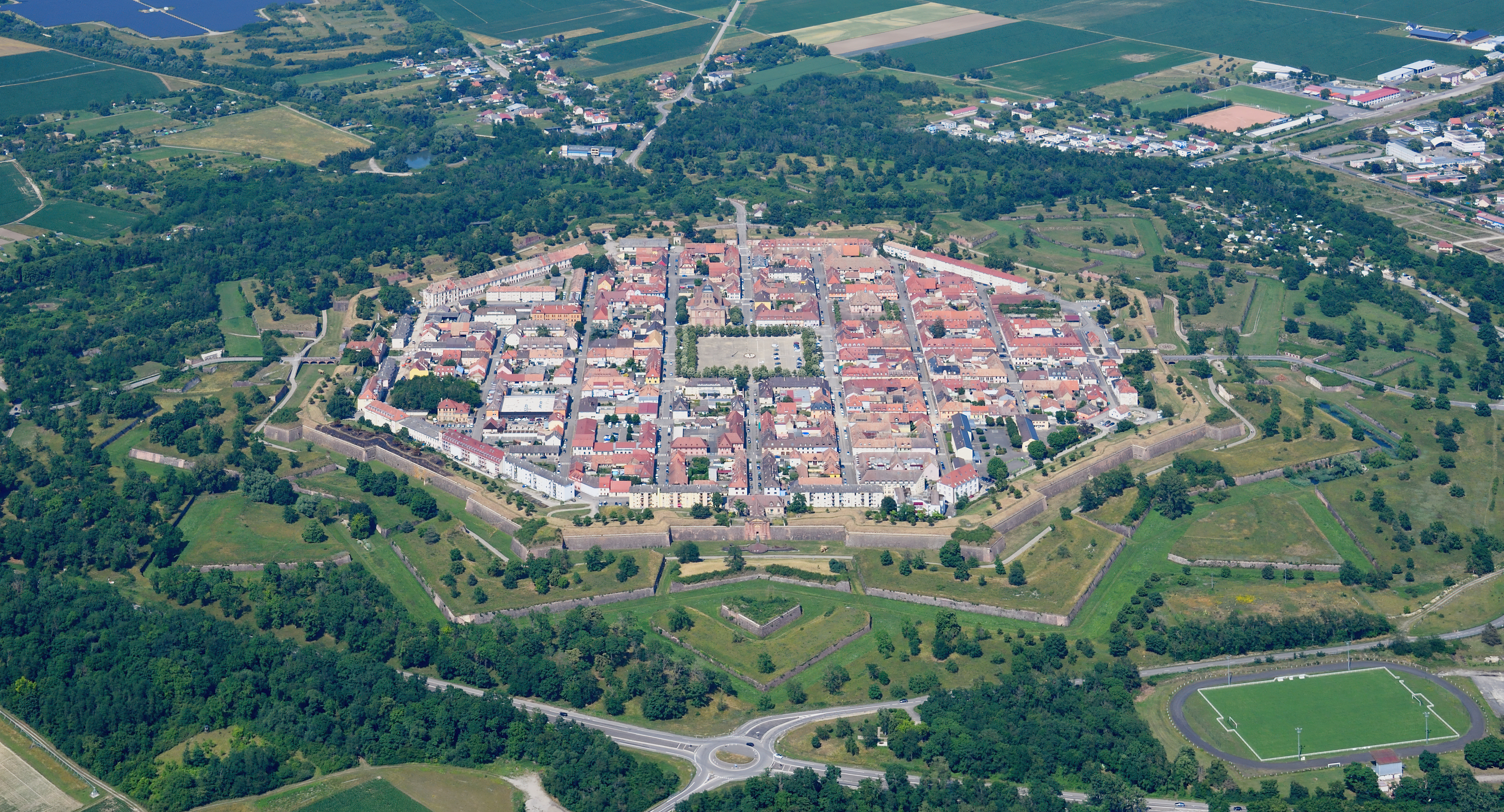
Aerial photograph of Neuf Brisach

- Bayonne, Aquitaine
- Belfort, Franche-Comté
- Blaye, Aquitaine
- Citadel of Arras, Pas-de-Calais
- Citadel of Montreuil-sur-Mer, Pas-de-Calais
- Citadel of Lille, Nord
- Fort Barraux, Isère
- Fort de La Prée, Ile de Ré
- Fort de Bellegarde, Le Perthus
- Fort of Mont Alban, Nice
- Fort Carré, Antibes, French riviera
- Fort Legarde, Prats-de-Mollo-la-Preste, Pyrénées-Orientales
- Neuf-Brisach, Haut Rhin
- Le Château-d'Oléron, Charente-Maritime
- Perpignan, Languedoc-Roussillon
- Place forte of Mont-Dauphin, Haute-Alpes
- Citadel of St Jean Pied de Port, Aquitaine
- Saint-Martin-de-Ré, Poitou-Charentes
- Bergues, Nord
- Le Quesnoy, Nord
- Maubeuge, Nord
- Rocroi, Ardennes
- Toul, Lorraine
- Gravelines, Nord
- Fort de Sainte-Adresse, Le Havre, Seine-Maritime
- Fort de Tourneville, Le Havre, Seine-Maritime
- Saint-Malo, Ille-et-Vilaine, Brittany
- Fort d'Alet, Saint-Servan, Ille-et-Vilaine, Brittany
- Fort de La Prée, Île de Ré
- Navarrenx, Pyrénées-Atlantiques
- Citadelle de Besançon
- Fort de Bregille, Besançon
- Fort de Chaudanne, Besançon
- Fort Griffon, Besançon
- Fort de La Hougue, Saint-Vaast-la-Hougue, Manche
- Fort de Tatihou, Ile de Tatihou
- Citadelle d'Entrevaux, Entrevaux, Alpes-de-Haute-Provence
- Longwy, Meurthe-et-Moselle
- Palace of the Kings of Majorca, Perpignan
- The Fortifications of Paris, for example Fort d'Ivry

== Ghana ==
- Fort Coenraadsburg
- Fort Saint Anthony
- Osu Castle
- Elmina Castle
- São Sebastião

== Germany ==
- Frankfurt am Main
- Hamburg
- Lübeck
- Mainz Citadel
- Petersberg Citadel, Erfurt
- Rostock
- Vechta
- Emden
- Koblenz

== Greece ==
- Heraklion, Crete
- Actium Fortress
- Rio Castle, Rio

== Guinea-Bissau ==
- Cacheu Fort
- São José

== Hungary ==
- Komarom fortification system includes three forts Csillag, Monostor and Igmandi
- Buda Castle and Budapest Citadel in Budapest

== India ==
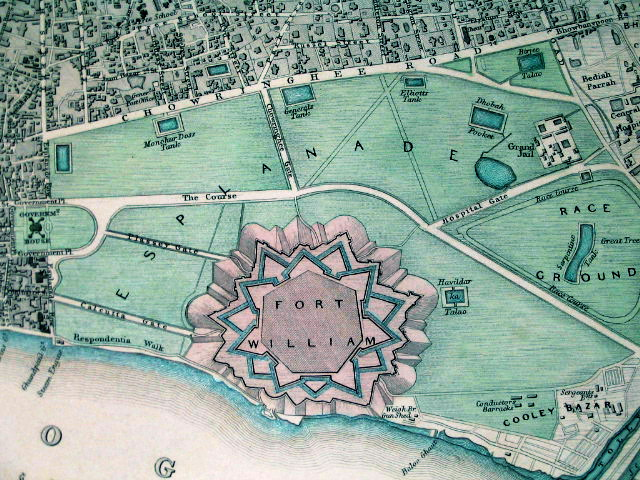
Plan (top-view) of Fort William, c. 1844

- Bihu Loukon, Imphal
- Fort St. George, Chennai
- Fort William, Kolkata
- Manjarabad Fort, Sakleshpur
- Chaul Fort, Revdanda, Maharashtra
- Star Fort, Jhansi
- St. Angelo Fort
- Fortress of Chaul
- São Tomé, Diu
- Daman
- São Jerónimo

Goa

- Corjuem Fort
- Santo António
- Mormugão fort
- Gaspar Dias
- Reis Magos
- Aguada Fort
- São João
- Santíssima Trindade
- Santa Cruz
- Cabo de Rama Fort
- Ponda Fort
- Gandaulim Fort
- Naroa Fort
- São Tiago
- Nossa Senhora do Cabo
- São Sebastião
- São Bartolomeu
- Santo Estevão

== Indonesia ==
- Batavia Castle, Jakarta
- Fort Rotterdam, Makassar
- Fort Victoria, Ambon
- Fort Amsterdam, Ambon
- Fort Nassau, Banda Islands
- Fort Belgica, Banda Islands
- Fort Revenge, Banda Islands
- Fort Hollandia, Banda Islands
- Fort Oranje, Ternate
- Fort Marlborough, Bengkulu
- Fort Vastenburg, Surakarta

== Israel ==
- Temple Mount, Jerusalem

== Italy ==
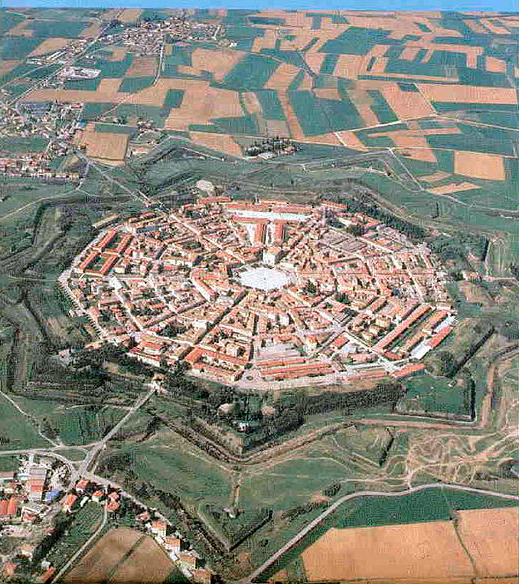
The town of Palmanova is encircled by massive Venetian defensive systems that are a UNESCO World Heritage Site since 9 July 2017.

- Capua, Capua, Lazio
- Castello Angioino, Mola di Bari
- Castello di Acaya, Acaya, Lecce, Apulia
- Castello di Carlo V, Crotone, Calabria
- Castello di Copertino, Copertino, Apulia
- Castello di Lecce, Lecce, Apulia
- Castello Normanno-Svevo di Bari, Bari, Apulia
- Castello Svevo di Barletta, Barletta, Apulia
- Citadel of Alessandria, Alessandria, Piedmont
- Citadel of Ancona, Ancona
- Città di Castello, Umbria (bastion traces can still be seen in some parts of the city)
- Forte a Mare, Brindisi, Apulia
- Forte Diamante, Genoa, Liguria
- Forte Puin, Genoa, Liguria
- Forte San Giacomo, Vado Ligure, Liguria
- Forte Santa Tecla, Genoa, Liguria
- Fortezza Medicea, Arezzo, Tuscany
- Fortezza Nuova, Livorno
- Fortezza Vecchia, Livorno
- Grosseto, Grosseto, Tuscany
- Guastalla, Emilia-Romagna (only survives in outline, walls demolished)
- Forte Stella, Porto Ercole, Tuscany
- Fortino di Sant'Ignazio, Cagliari, Sardinia
- Fortress of Poggio Imperiale, Poggibonsi, Tuscany
- Fortress of Priamar, Savona, Liguria
- Fortress of Radicofani, Tuscany
- Fortress of Vinadio, Vinadio, Piedmont
- Livorno (Old City – traces can still seen)
- Lucca, Tuscany
- Verona, Veneto
- Ferrara, Emilia-Romagna
- Palmanova, Palmanova, Friuli-Venezia Giulia
- Sabbioneta, Sabbioneta, Lombardy
- Real Cittadella, Messina, Sicily (only some walls are visible, destroyed by earthquake )

== Republic of Ireland ==
- Duncannon Fort, Duncannon, County Wexford
- Charles Fort, Kinsale
- Elizabeth Fort, Cork
- Spike Island, County Cork
- The Magazine Fort, Phoenix Park, County Dublin

== Japan ==
The 19th-century Goryōkaku

- Goryōkaku (五稜郭), Hakodate, Hokkaido
- Hekirichi Bastion Fort (戸切地陣屋), Hokuto, Hokkaido
- Tatsuoka Castle (龍岡城) in Saku, Nagano
- Shiryōkaku (四稜郭), Hakodate, Hokkaido

== Latvia ==
- Daugavgrīva Fortress
- Daugavpils Fortress
- Rīga Old Town, the outline of the bastions preserved as a park

== Lithuania ==
- Biržai Castle in Biržai
- Klaipėda Castle in Klaipėda
- Trakai Island Castle in Trakai
- Castle and Fortress in Kaunas
- Lithuanian Sea Museum, Klaipėda
- Klaipėda and Klaipėda Castle

== Malaysia ==
- Fort Cornwallis in George Town, Penang

== Malta ==
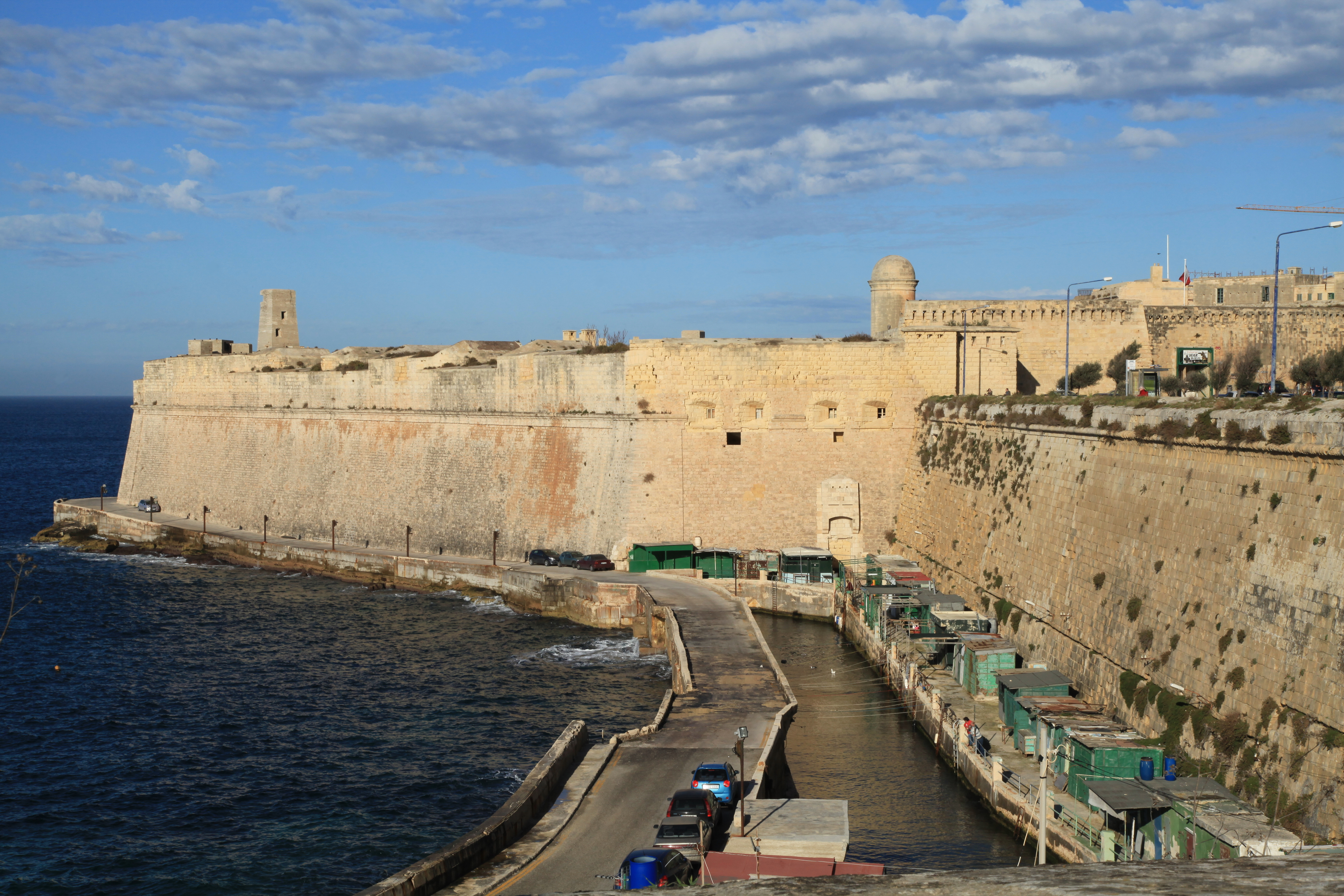
Fort Saint Elmo in Valletta

- Cittadella, Victoria, Gozo
- Fort Chambray, Għajnsielem
- Fort Ricasoli
- Fort Manoel
- Fort St. Angelo
- Fort Saint Elmo mostly a bastion fort, but with one major wall of reentrant angles.
- Fort San Lucian
- Fort Saint Michael
- Fort San Salvatore
- Fortifications of Mdina

== Mexico ==
- Fort of San Diego
- San Juan de Ulúa
- fort of San Carlos
- Fuerte de San Felipe de Bacalar
- Fort of San Miguel
- Fort of San Jose

== Morocco ==
- Borj Nord
- El Jadida

== Mozambique ==
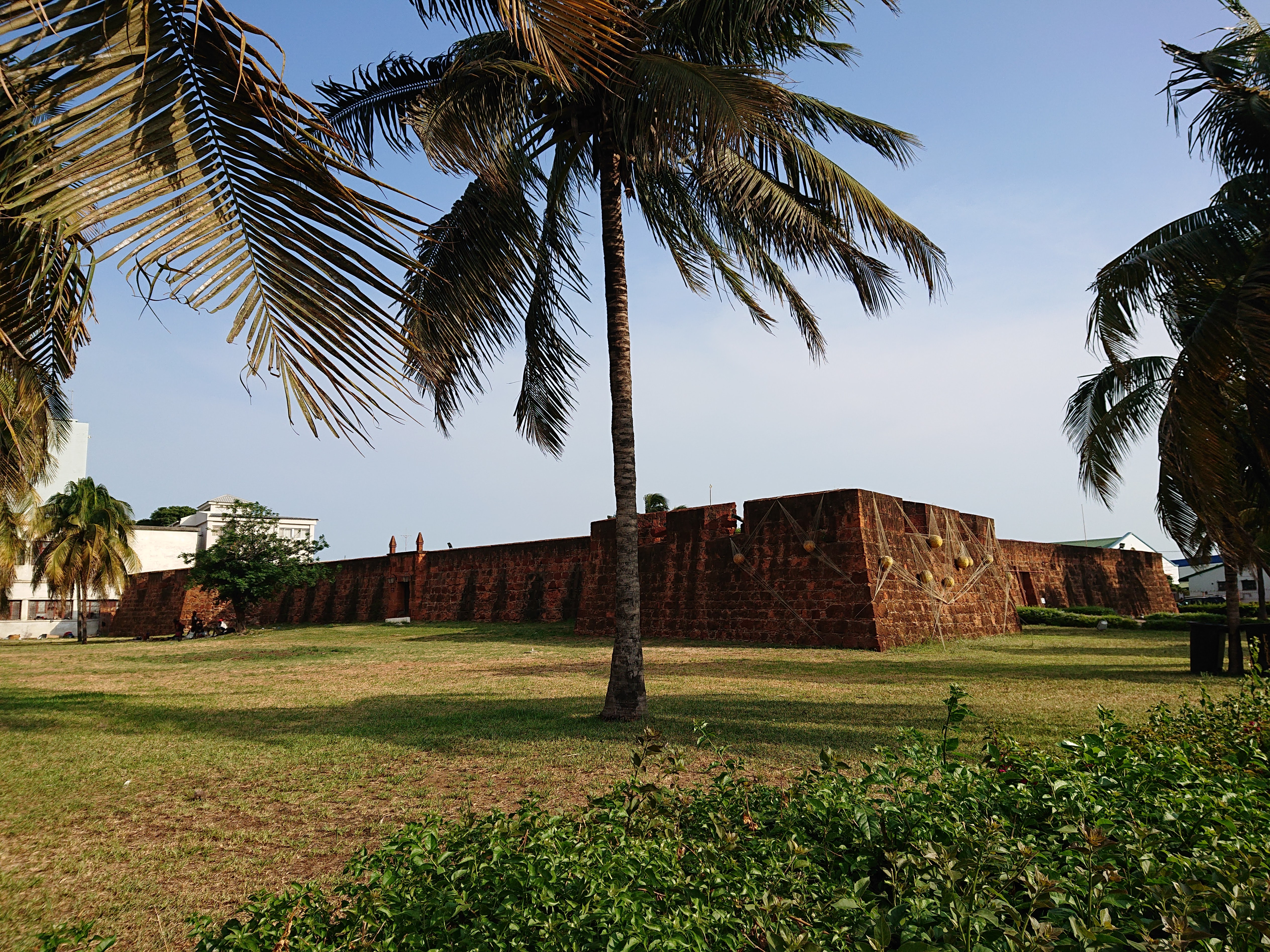
Fort Nossa Senhora da Conceição, Maputo

- Nossa Senhora da Conceição (Inhambane)
- Nossa Senhora da Conceição (Maputo)
- Santo António
- São Caetano
- São João Baptista
- São José
- São Lourenço
- São Marçal
- São Sebastião
- São Tiago Maior

== Netherlands ==
=== Groningen ===
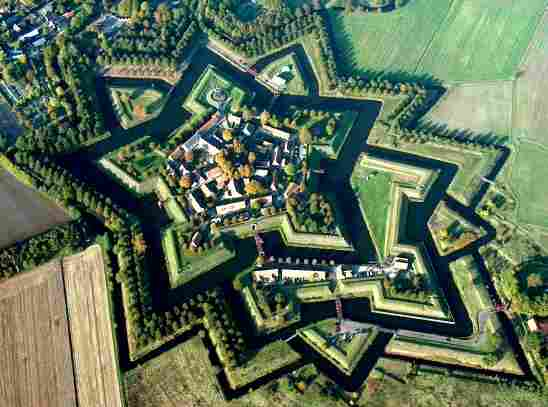
Fort Bourtange

- Appingedam
- Bourtange
- Delfzijl
- Groningen
- Nieuweschans
- Oudeschans
- Winschoten

=== Friesland ===
- Bolsward
- Dokkum
- Franeker
- Harlingen
- Leeuwarden
- Sloten
- Sneek
- Stavoren

=== Drenthe ===
- Coevorden

=== Overijssel ===
- Blokzijl
- Deventer
- Enschede
- Goor
- Hasselt
- Kampen
- Oldenzaal
- Ommen
- Ootmarsum
- Steenwijk
- Vollenhove
- Zwolle

=== Gelderland ===
- Arnhem
- Bredevoort
- Doesburg
- Doetinchem
- Elburg
- Groenlo
- Harderwijk
- Hattem
- Lochem
- Nijmegen
- Tiel
- Wageningen
- Zaltbommel
- Zutphen
- Loevestein Castle

=== Utrecht ===
- Amersfoort
- Oudewater
- Utrecht
- Woerden

=== North Holland ===
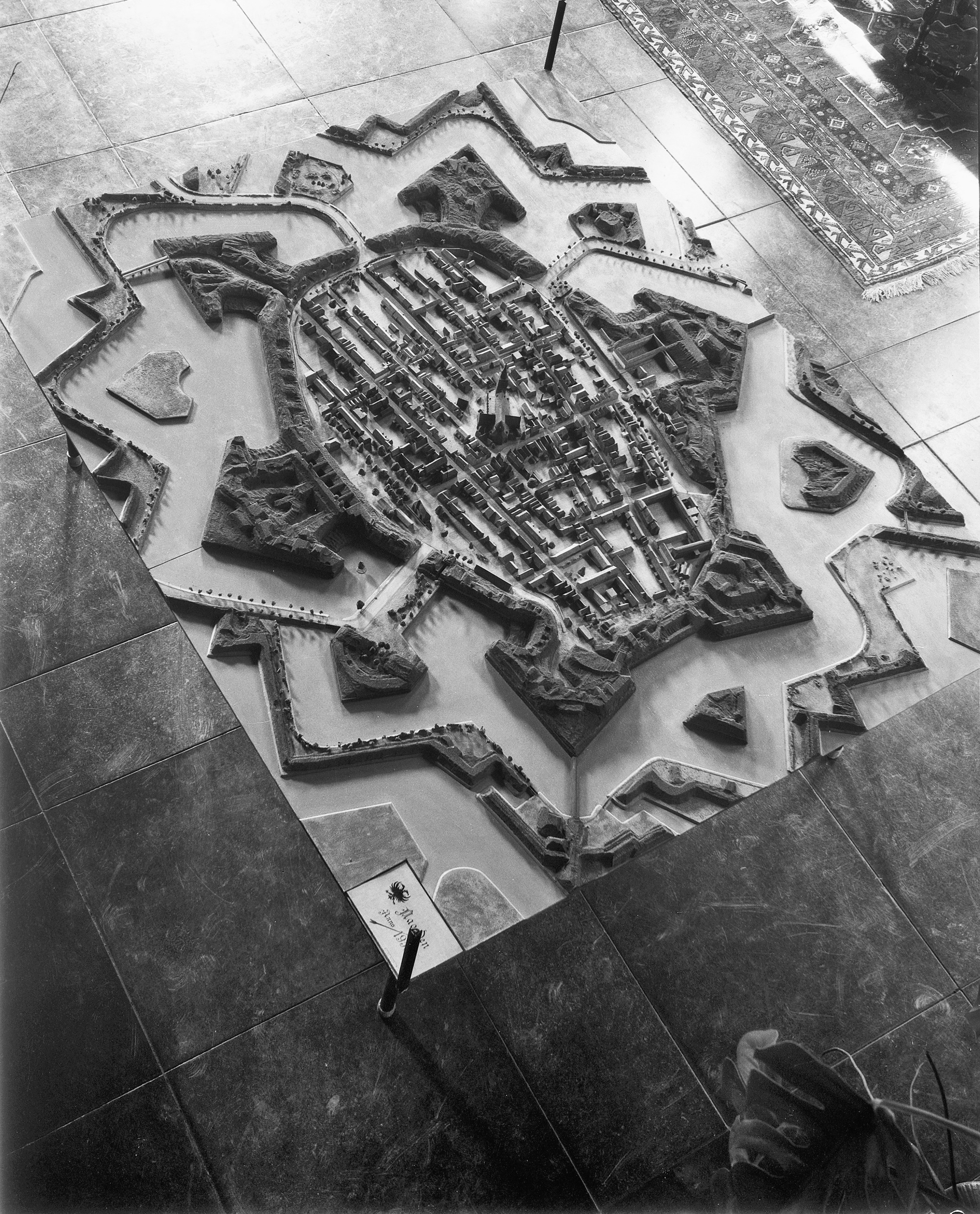
Model of the fortifications of Naarden

- Alkmaar
- Amsterdam
- Den Helder
- Edam
- Enkhuizen
- Haarlem
- Hoorn
- Medemblik
- Monnickendam
- Muiden
- Naarden
- Purmerend
- Weesp

=== South Holland ===
- Brielle
- Gorinchem
- Hellevoetsluis
- Nieuwpoort
- Leiden

=== Zeeland ===
- Aardenburg
- Brouwershaven
- Fort Bath
- Goes
- Hulst
- IJzendijke
- Middelburg
- Oostburg
- Retranchement
- Sluis
- Vlissingen
- Zierikzee
- Veere

=== North Brabant ===
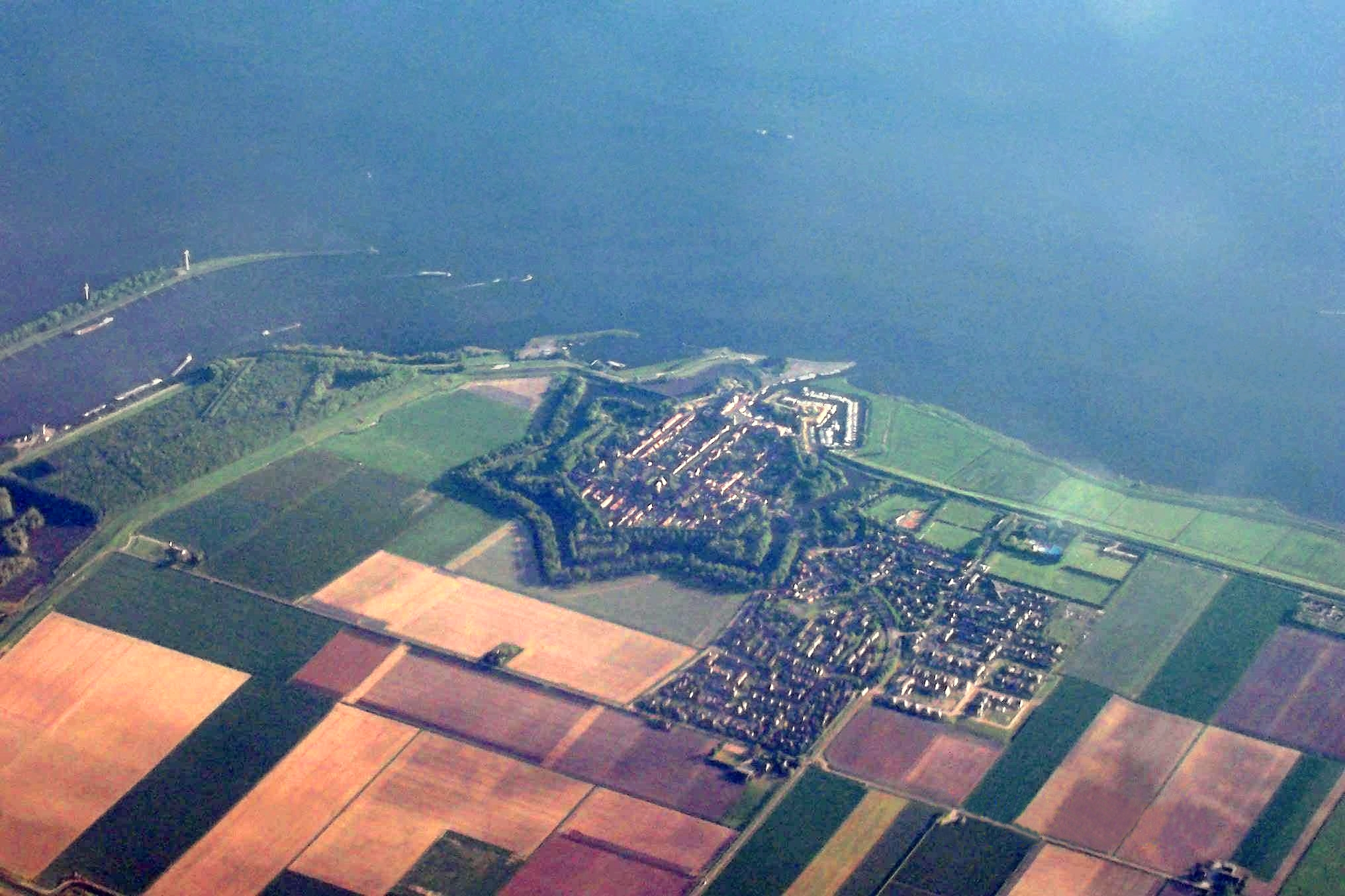
Willemstad from the air

- Bergen op Zoom
- Breda
- Geertruidenberg
- Grave
- Helmond
- 's-Hertogenbosch
- Heusden
- Klundert
- Megen
- Oss
- Ravenstein
- Steenbergen
- Willemstad
- Woudrichem

=== Limburg ===
- Arcen
- Gennep
- Maastricht
- Nieuwstadt
- Roermond
- Sittard
- Stevensweert
- Venlo
- Weert

== Norway ==
- Fredrikstad Fortress, Fredrikstad
- Fredriksvern, Stavern
- Kongsvinger Fortress, Kongsvinger
- Kristiansten Fortress, Trondheim
- Vardøhus Fortress, Vardø

== Philippines ==
- Fort Santiago (in Intramuros), Manila
- Fort San Pedro, Cebu City
- Fort Pilar, Zamboanga City
- Fuerte de la Concepcion y del Triunfo, Ozamiz City

== Portugal ==
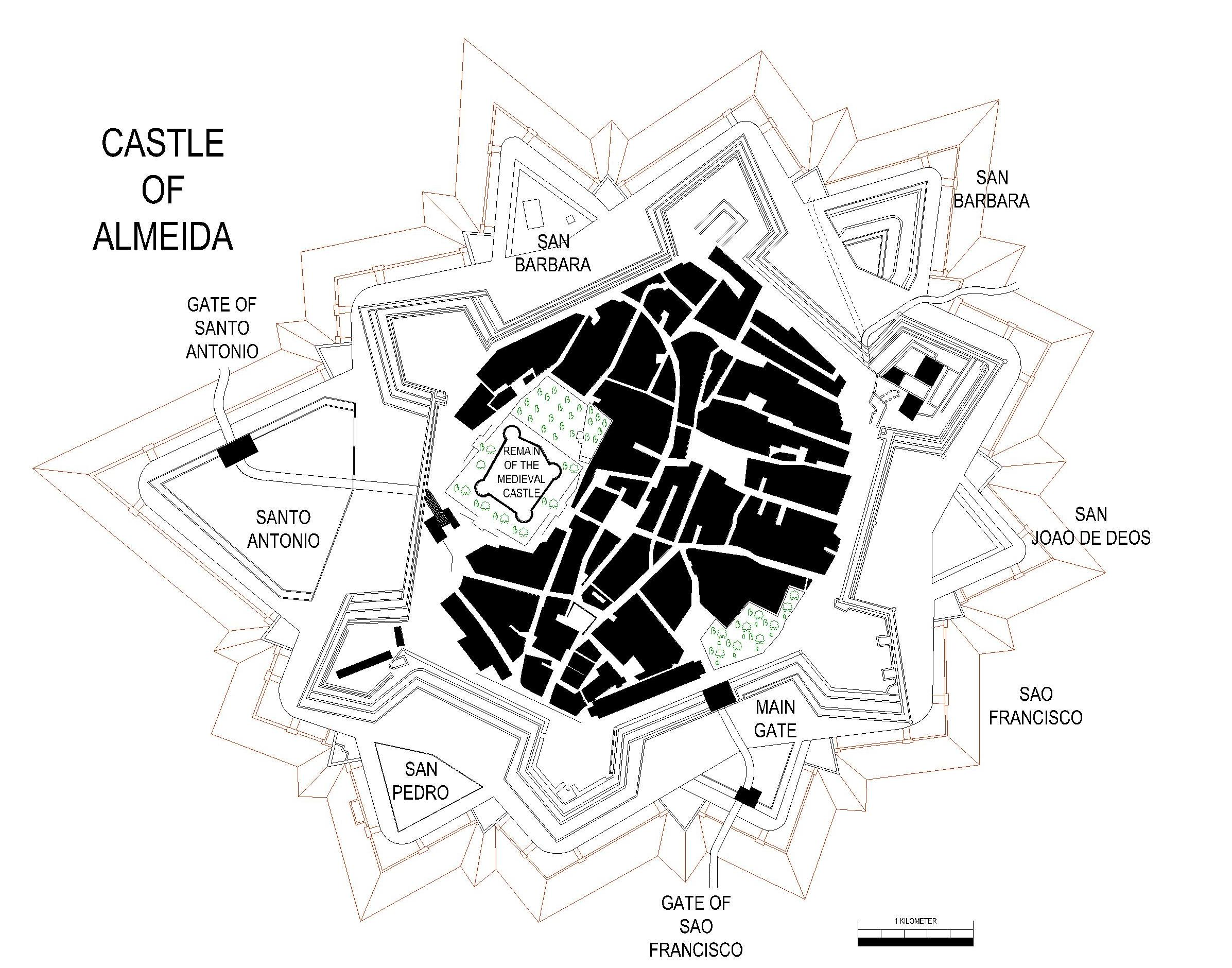
The Fortress of Almeida

- Almeida
- Azores – Fortaleza de São João Baptista/Fortaleza de São Sebastião (Terceira)
- Cascais – Forte de Santo António da Barra, Cidadela de Cascais
- Elvas – Forte de Santa Luzia
- Estremoz
- Évora
- Lisbon-Forte de São Bruno, Forte de São Julião da Barra (Oeiras)
- Monção
- Peniche
- Valença
- Fort São Roque
- Nossa Senhora da Graça Fort in Elvas

== Poland ==
- Zamość Fortress
- Koźle
- Boyen Fortress
- Poznań Fortress
- Krzyżtopór
- Kłodzko Fortress
- Srebrnogórska Fortress
- Nysa
- Gdańsk
- Toruń
- Wisloujscie Fortress
- Pilica Castle
- Warsaw Citadel and Fortress
- Modlin Fortress
- Kraków, Lesser Poland, several forts left, the Wawel Castle was the citadel, the Kościuszko's Mound is located in the 2nd fort, and the only remaining part of the walls is the 3rd bastion.
- Jasna Góra Monastery
- Grudziądz Fortress
- Wrocław
- Przemyśl
- Dęblin Fortress

== Puerto Rico ==
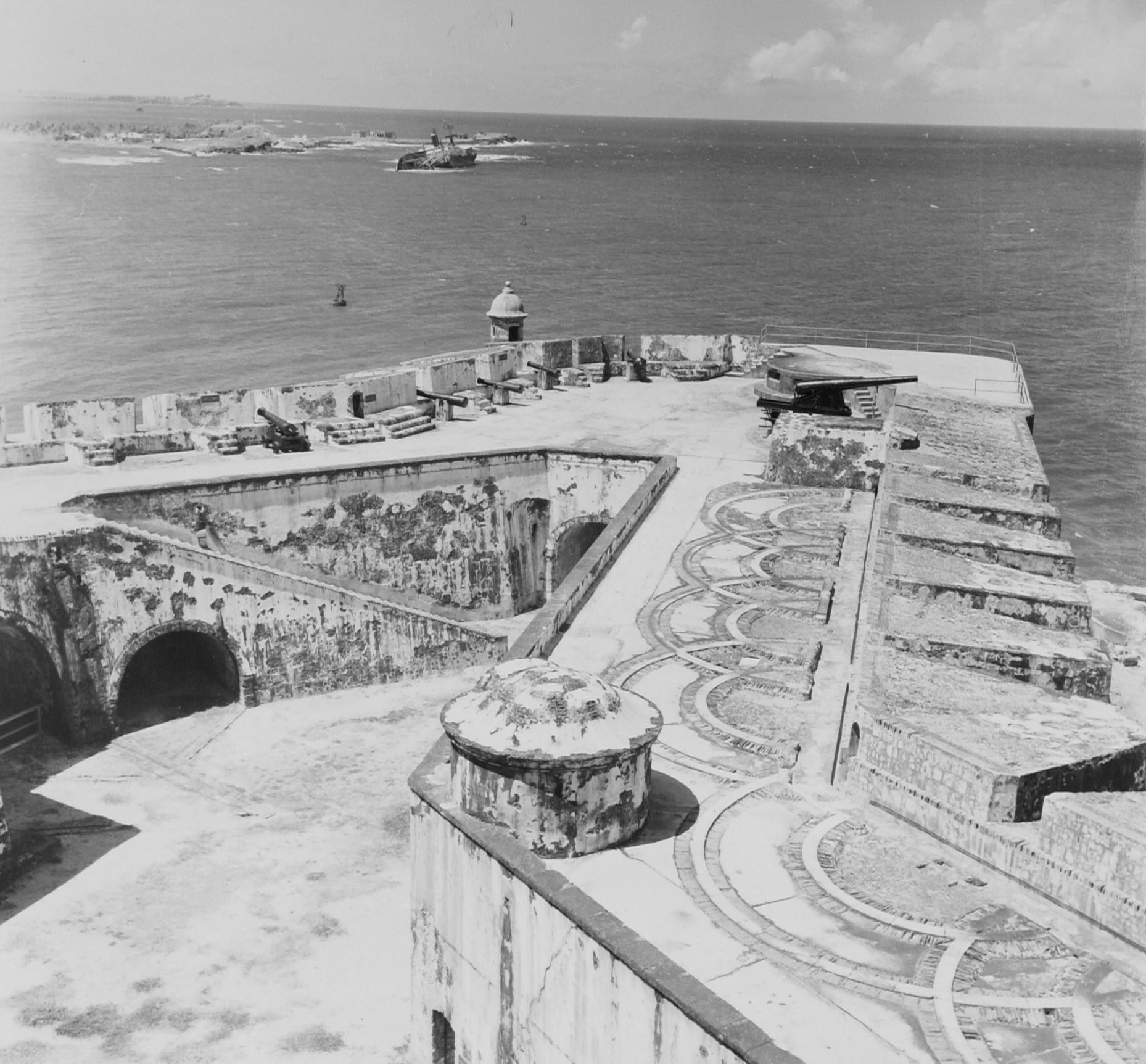
Castillo San Felipe del Morro in San Juan

- Fort San Cristóbal, San Juan
- Castillo San Felipe del Morro, San Juan
- Fort Conde de Mirasol, Vieques
- Fortín San Juan de la Cruz, Toa Baja

== Romania ==
- Ada Kaleh
- Alba Iulia
- Arad
- Făgăraș
- Oradea
- Timișoara
- Miercurea Ciuc

== Russia ==
- Peter and Paul Fortress, St. Petersburg
- Nyenschantz
- Pillau citadel (Baltiysk)
- Rostov Kremlin
- Abbasabad
- Shlisselburg Fortress, Shlisselburg
- New Dvina Fort, Arkhangelsk
- Kronshlot, Kronstadt
- Krasny Yar Fortress, Krasny Yar
- Vyborg
- Kaliningrad, Kaliningrad oblast

== São Tomé e Príncipe ==
- Santo António, Príncipe
- São Jerónimo, São Tomé
- São Sebastião, São Tomé

== Serbia ==
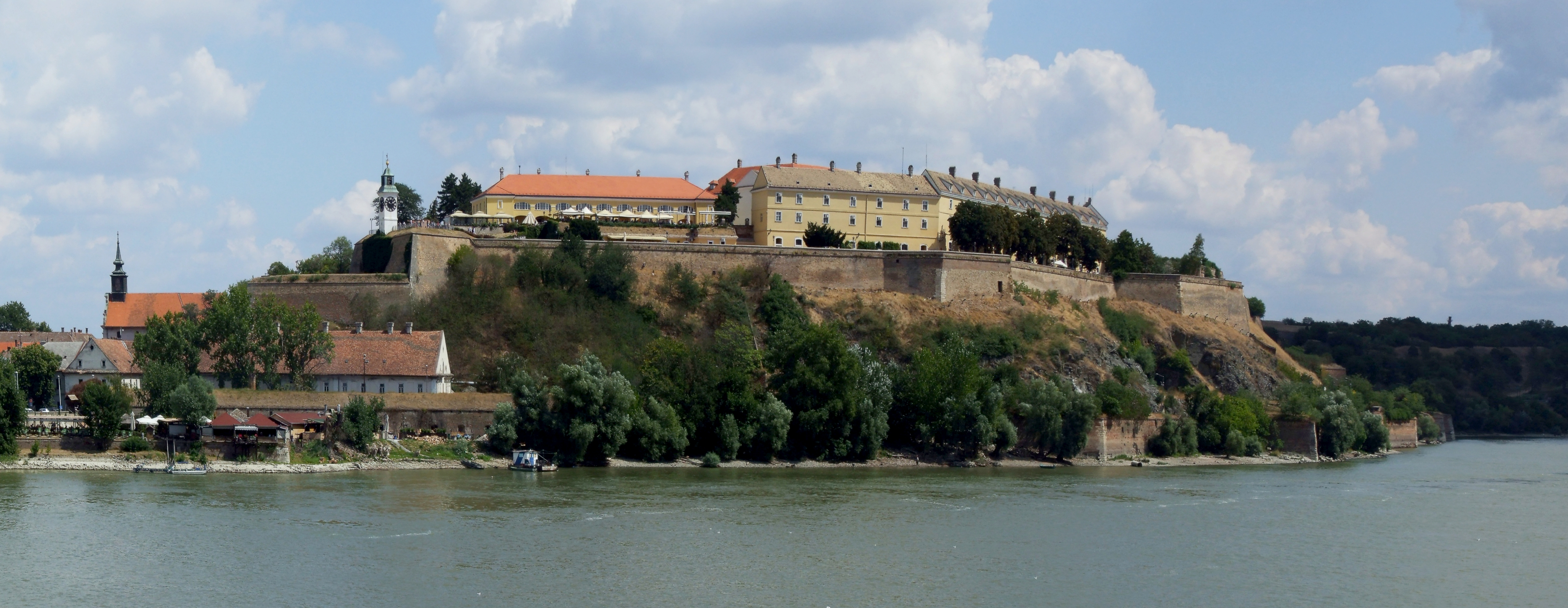
Petrovaradin Fortress in Novi Sad, Serbia

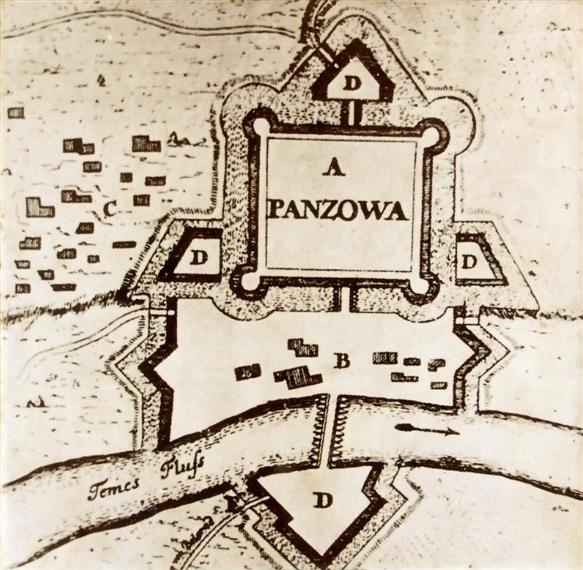
Pančevo Fortress in Pančevo, 18th century

- Belgrade Fortress, Belgrade, partially razed after the Berlin Congress of 1878 and the end of the Military Frontier. Restored several times afterwards and areas repurposed.
- Fetislam, Kladovo, Turkish bastion fort until 1867. Restored several times afterwards.
- Niš Fortress, Niš, city defensive walls razed while the bastion fort was preserved.
- Pančevo Fortress, Pančevo, razed in 1739.
- Petrovaradin Fortress, Novi Sad, best preserved bastion fort town of the Military Frontier.
- Sremska Rača, Sremska Rača, razed after the Berlin Congress of 1878 and the end of the Military Frontier.

== Slovakia ==
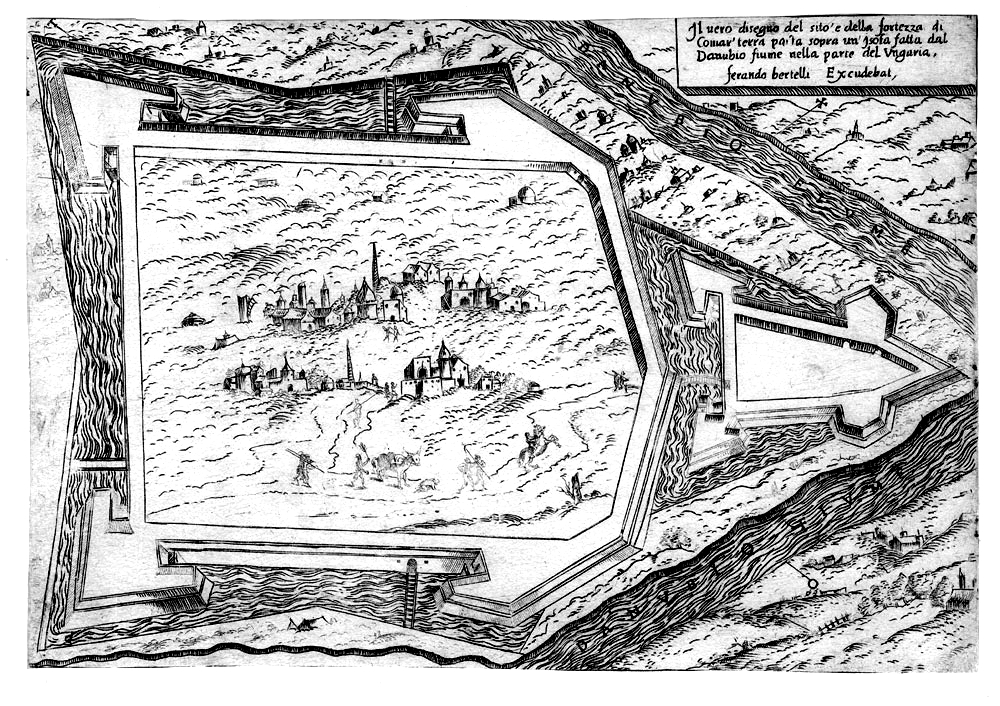
Star Fort in Komárno, Slovakia

- Nové Zámky – only to be seen as a hexagonally shaped city centre
- Komárno – mostly preserved city fortification complex contains Komárno fortress (New and Old) and fortifications of the city as Palatine's line and Vah's line and also three forts in the area of neighbouring city Komárom (Igmand, Csillag (English: Star) and Monostor) (see Hungary)
- Leopoldov – mostly preserved, serving as state prison built like Fortress Leopoldov
- Holíč – château of the Habsburgs named Holíč Castle (Slovak: Holíčsky kaštieľ) rebuilt from a 17th-century fortress with the history going to 12th century.

== South Africa ==
- Fort de Goede Hoop 1652–1674, demolished after permanent residence was taken up in the Castle of Good Hope.
- Castle of Good Hope 1666–current, constructed to replace the earthen Fort de Goede Hoop.

== Spain ==
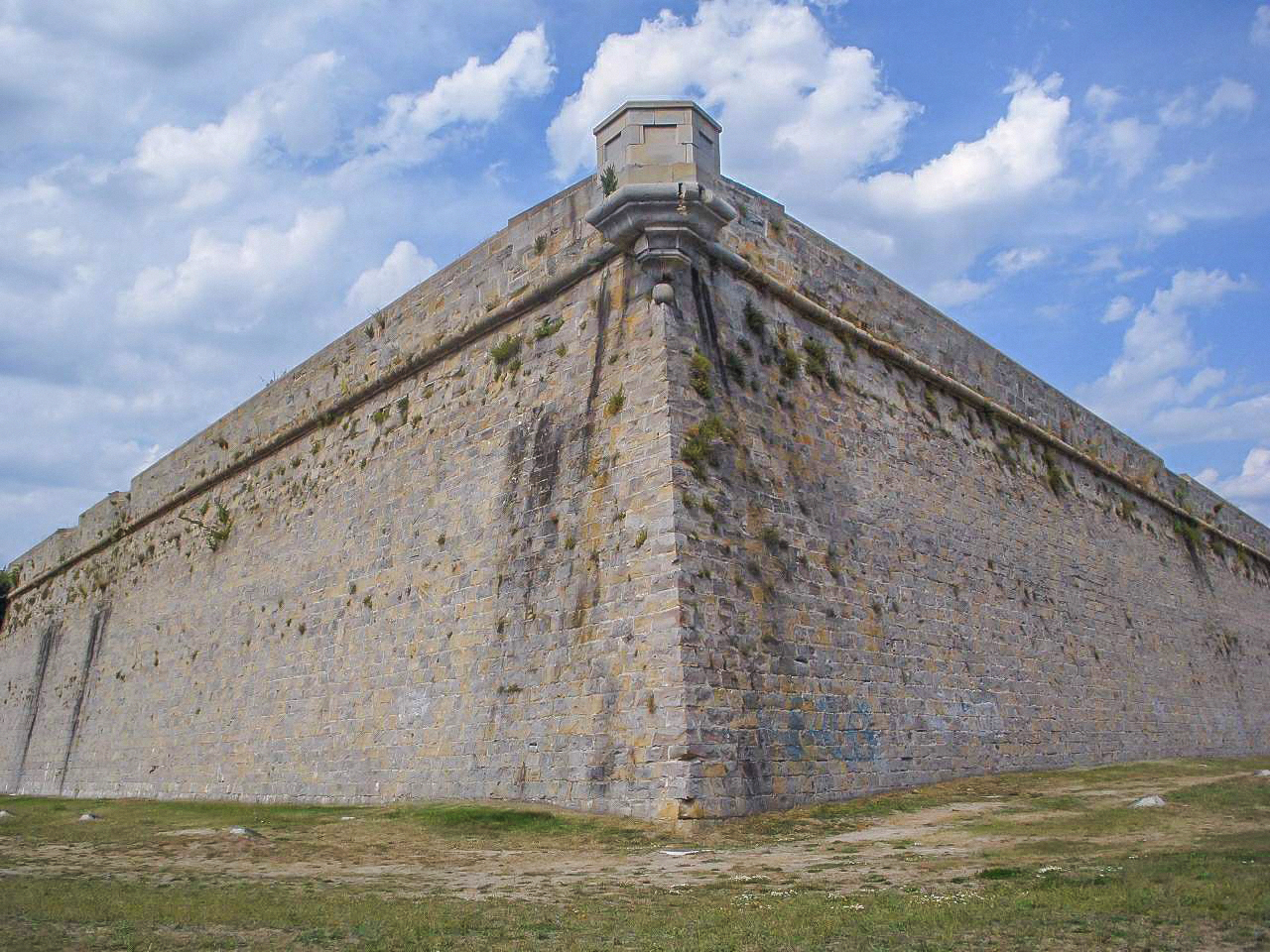
One of the bastions of the Citadel of Pamplona

- Aldea del Obispo – Real Fuerte de la Concepción
- Badajoz
- A Coruña-Castillo de San Antón y Castillo de San Diego
- Barcelona-Castillo de Montjuïc y la Antigua Ciudadela Militar de Barcelona
- Cádiz-Castillo de San Sebastián, Castillo de Santa Catalina, Baluarte de la Candelaria, Fuerte de Puntales y Fuerte de Cortadura
- Ciudad Rodrigo
- Ferrol-Castillo de San Felipe y Castillo de de La Palma
- Figueres-Castell de Sant Ferran
- Jaca-Ciudadela de Jaca
- La Línea de la Concepción-fuertes de San Felipe, San Carlos, San Fernando, San José, Santa Mariana, San Benito, y Fuerte de Santa Bárbara
- Pamplona-Ciudadela de Pamplona
- Roses, Girona, Catalonia,-Ciudadela de Rosas
- Salamanca
- Salvaterra de Miño-Castillo de Santiago de Aytona
- Palma de Mallorca

== Sri Lanka ==
- Star Fort (Matara)
- Jaffna Fort (Jaffna)
- Galle Fort

== Suriname ==
- Fort Nieuw-Amsterdam, New Amsterdam, Commewijne
- Fort Zeelandia, Waterside, Paramaribo

== Sweden ==
- Bohus Fortress
- Borgholm Castle
- Eda Skans
- Jönköping Castle
- Karlsvärd Citadel
- Kristianstad old town. Some bastions preserved.
- Landskrona Citadel
- Malmö Castle
- Varberg Fortress
- Älvsborg Castle

== Taiwan ==
- Fengguiwei Fort, Penghu
- Fort Zeelandia, Tainan
- Fort Provintia, Tainan
- Fort San Salvador, Keelung
- Eternal Golden Castle (億載金城), Tainan

== Ukraine ==
- Pecherska Lavra, Kyiv
- Fortress of St. Elizabeth, Kropyvnytskyi
- Pidhirtsi Castle
- Vasylkiv Fortification, Kyiv
- Ukrainian line, multiple sites
- Uzhhorod Castle
- Zolochiv Castle
- Kamianets-Podilskyi Castle and Kamianets-Podilskyi old town

== United Kingdom ==
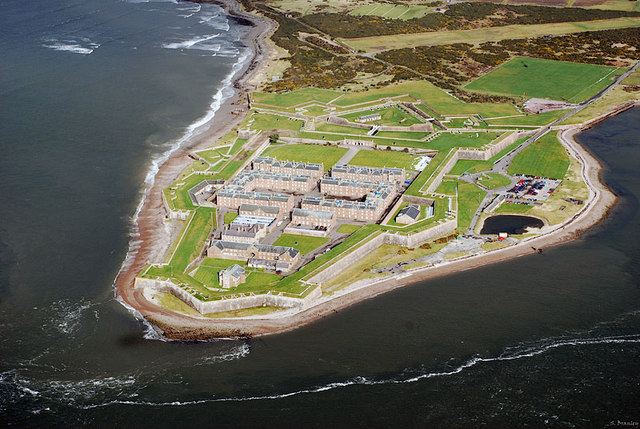
Fort George, Scotland from the air. It is the best preserved fort of its era in the British Isles.

- Fort Amherst, Chatham
- Carisbrooke Castle, Isle of Wight
- Deal Castle, Deal, Kent
- Derry city walls
- Ebrington Barracks, Derry
- Fort George, Highland
- Berwick town walls, Berwick-upon-Tweed
- Hilsea Lines,
- Fort Monckton, Gosport
- Pendennis Castle, Falmouth
- Royal Citadel, Plymouth
- Star Castle, Isles of Scilly
- Tilbury Fort
- Fort Cumberland, Portsmouth

The outlines of some other star forts from the English Civil War exist. These were often built of ditches and earthen ramparts and were redoubts built to defend weak points in older fortifications such as Fort Royal Hill, Worcester, was built to defend a hill within 17th-century artillery range of the city's medieval walls.

== United States ==
- Castillo de San Marcos, St. Augustine, Florida
- Fort Mifflin, Philadelphia, Pennsylvania
- Fort Morgan, Alabama
- Fort Union Valmora, New Mexico
- Fort Jay, on Governors Island in New York Bay
- Fort Wood, on Liberty Island in New York Bay
- Fort Brewerton Oneida River, mouth of Oneida Lake Oswego New York
- Fort Ticonderoga on Lake Champlain, New York
- Fort Saint-Frédéric, Crown Point, New York
- Fort Johnston (Leesburg, Virginia)
- Fort Negley, Nashville, Tennessee
- Fort Ligonier, Ligonier, Pennsylvania
- Russian Fort Elizabeth, Waimea, Kauai County, Hawaii
- Ninety Six National Historic Site, Star Fort in Ninety Six, South Carolina
- Star Fort, formerly Fort Alabama, Winchester, Virginia
- Fort St. Andrews, was located on Cumberland Island, Georgia.
- Fort Stanwix, Rome, New York
- Fort Ontario, Oswego, New York
- Fort Jackson, Louisiana Plaquemines Parish, Louisiana
- Fort Independence (Massachusetts), on Castle Island, Boston Massachusetts
- Fort Monroe in Hampton, Virginia
- Fort Lee in Salem, Massachusetts
- Fort Zachary Taylor, Key West, FL
- Fort Jefferson, Key West, FL
- Fort McHenry, Baltimore, Maryland
- Fort Frederick, on the Potomac River near Big Pool, Maryland
- Fort Marshall, Baltimore, Maryland
- Fort Snelling, St. Paul, Minnesota
- Fort de Chartres, Illinois
- Fort Wayne (Detroit), Detroit, Michigan

== Venezuela ==
- Castillo de San Antonio de la Eminencia, Cumana

== Vietnam ==
- Hanoi#The Imperial Citadel of Thang Long – Hoàng Thành Thăng Long
- Ha Tay Province#Son Tay Citadel – Thành Sơn Tây
- Bac Ninh Province#Bac Ninh Citadel – Thành Bắc Ninh
- Hai Duong Province#Hai Duong Fortress – Pháo đài Hải Dương/Thành Đông
- Thanh Hoa Province#Ho Citedel – Thành nhà Hồ
- Thanh Hoa Province#Hac Thanh Citadel – Thành Hạc Thành
- Nghe An Province#Vinh Citadel – Thành Nghệ An/Vinh
- Ha Tinh Province#Tan Giang Fortress – Pháo đài Tân Giang
- Ha Tinh Province#Ky Chau Fortress – Pháo đài Kỳ Châu
- Quang Binh Province#Dong Hoi Citadel – Thành Đồng Hới
- Quang Tri Province#Quang Tri Citadel – Thành Quảng Trị
- Huế#Hue City Citadel – Thành Huế
- Huế#Imperial Citadel – Kinh thành Huế
- Da Nang#Dien Hai Citadel – Thành Điện Hải
- Quang Ngai Province#Chau Sa Citadel – Thành Châu Sa
- Binh Dinh Province#Binh Dinh Citadel – Thành Bình Định
- Binh Dinh Province#Do Ban Citadel – Thành Đồ Bàn
- Phu Yen Province#Ho Citadel – Thành Hồ
- Khanh Hoa Province#Dien Khanh Citadel – Thành Diên Khánh
- Ho Chi Minh City#Saigon – Thành Gia Định
