= Slota =

Slota (Czech/Slovak feminine: Slotová) is a surname. Notable people with the surname include:

- Gerald Slota (born 1965), American artist and photographer
- Ján Slota (born 1953), Slovak politician
