= Ponta da Mina =

- Cape
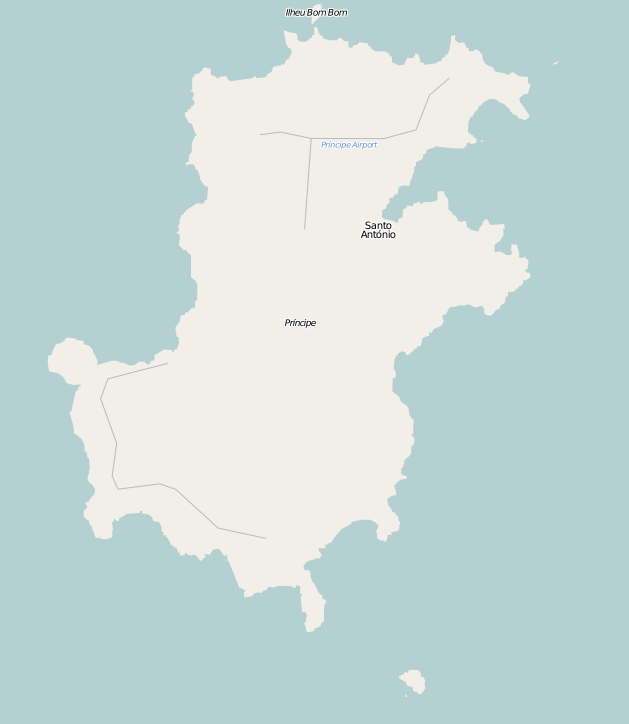
- Coordinates: 1°38′54″N 7°26′18″E
- Location: Northeastern Príncipe near Santo António
- Offshore water bodies: Atlantic Ocean

Ponta da Mina is a headland located some 2 km northeast of Santo António, the island capital of Príncipe in São Tomé and Príncipe. The point is on the southern shores of Baía de Santo António. It is fringed by rocks, and the ancient fortress Fortaleza de Santo António da Ponta da Mina stands at its summit.

Located next to the fortress is a lighthouse, built in 1996. Its focal height is 54 meters and its range is 9 nautical miles (17 km; 10 mi).
