= Slote =

Slote is a surname. Notable people with the surname include:

- Alfred Slote (1926–2026), American author
- Bernice Slote (1913–1983), American scholar
- Michael Slote, American academic and author

== See also ==
- Hower-Slote House
- Slate (surname)
- Slota
