= Fort São Lourenço (Mozambique) =

- Fortaleza de São Lourenço
- Mozambique Island in Mozambique
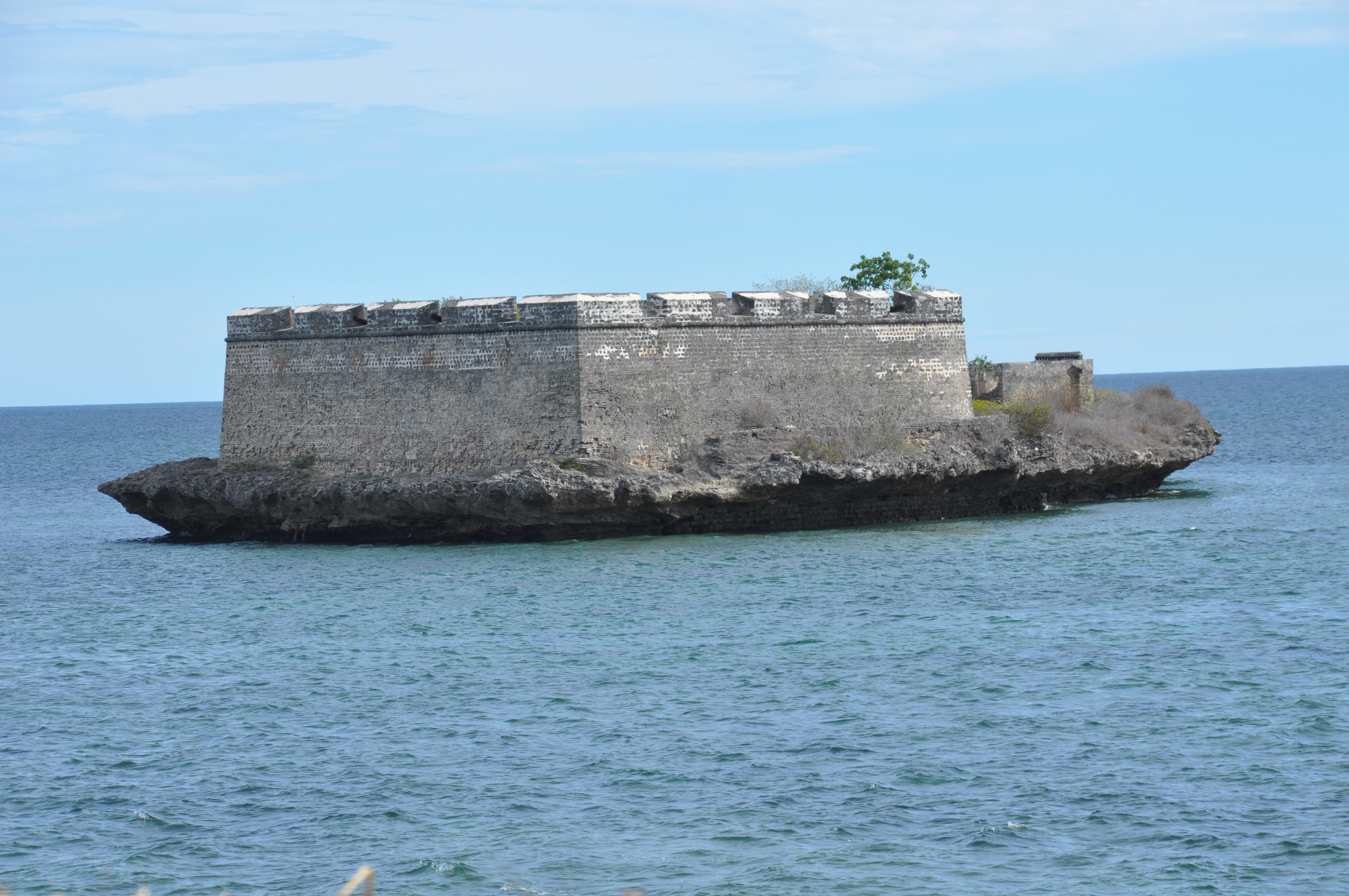

Site information
- Controlled by: Portugal; Mozambique
- Condition: Ruined

Location
- Coordinates: 15°03′02″S 40°43′35″E

Site history
- Built: 1695-1714

The Fort São Lourenço (Fortim de São Lourenço in Portuguese) is a small fort or fortlet built by the Portuguese and located on the São Lourenço Islet, next to the Island of Mozambique, province of Nampula, in Mozambique.

== History ==
It dates back to a fort built between 1587 and 1589, which was demolished in 1595, by order of the Portuguese Crown. On its foundations, a new fortification was built, whose layout is the current one.

The new structure began in 1695, by the governor Dom Estevão José da Costa, and was completed in the first decade of the 18th century, under Dom João Fernandes de Almeida. Its function was to defend the southwestern point of the entrance to the port of the Island of Mozambique, crossing fire with the fortress São Sebastião and the fort Santo António on the Island of Mozambique proper, for which it had twenty-two pieces of artillery.

It features a triangular plan, two bastions, and on its embankment rise the vaulted service rooms. The gun emplacements and bulwarks can be accessed via a ramp. The gate-of-arms opens through the curtain that connects the ramparts.

== See also ==
- Portuguese Mozambique
