= Forte de Santo Inácio de Tamandaré =

- Tamandaré, Pernambuco in Brazil
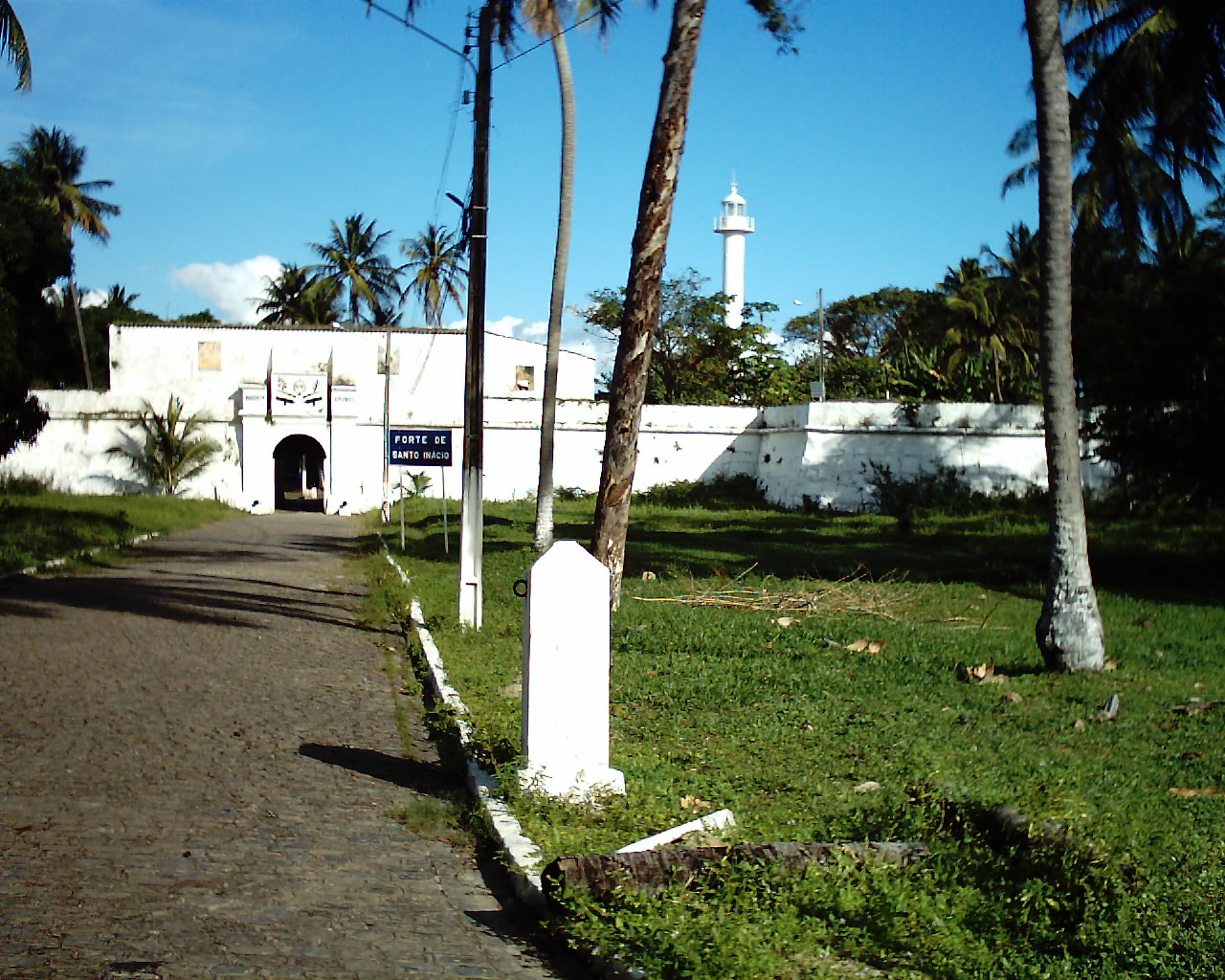
- View of the front of the fort

Site information
- Type: Fort

Location
- Location of Forte de Santo Inácio in Brazil
- Coordinates: 8.757604°S 35.099620°W

Forte de Santo Inácio is a fort located in Tamandaré, Pernambuco in Brazil. The fort was restored in 2015.

== See also ==
- History of Pernambuco
