= Fort Nossa Senhora da Conceição (Inhambane) =

Fort in Inhambane, Mozambique

- Fortaleza de Nossa Senhora da Conceição
- Inhambane in Mozambique
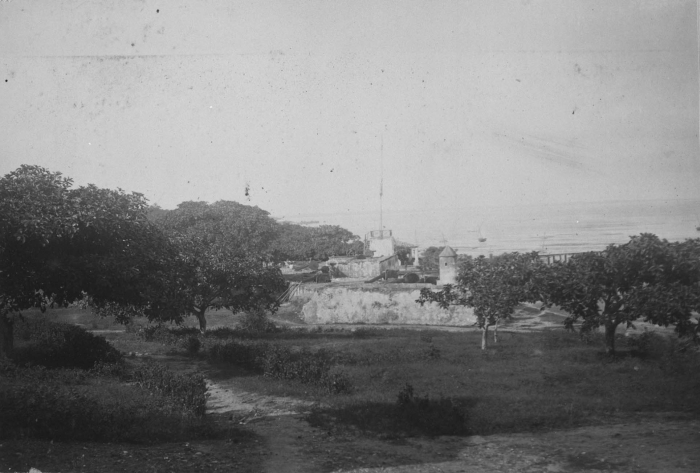
- View of the fort between 1890 and 1910.

Site information
- Controlled by: Portuguese Empire
- Condition: Demolished

Location
- Coordinates: 23°52′00″S 35°23′00″E

Site history
- Built: 1750-1763

The Fort Nossa da Conceição de Inhambane was located in the city of Inhambane, in the province of the same name, in Mozambique.

== History ==
The village was founded by Swahili merchants, having been visited by the Portuguese navigator Vasco da Gama in 1498, who called it Terra da Boa Gente or "Land of the Good Folk".

Although the Portuguese built a fortified trading post there in 1546, the process of permanent settlement only began between 1727 and 1731. Later, in 1764, the village received the rank of town. By 1781 it had a stockade that protected the church, homes, and a garden. By the end of the 18th century about 200 Christians inhabited the settlement. During this period, it suffered attacks from the Dutch and the French, with the looting of 1796 by French pirates based in Réunion being highlighted.

Faced with these threats and as a complement to the defense of the coast of Mozambique, two light fortifications were erected at Inhambane in the 18th century, both as stockades. Both still existed in 1765, in ruins, with only one artillery piece, incapable of service.

Between 1750 and 1758, the settlement of Inhambane was transferred to the Inhambane peninsula by order of the Governor of Mozambique, Francisco de Melo e Castro (1750-1758) and a new fortification was built.

Governor Pedro de Saldanha e Albuquerque (1759-1763), in 1763, completed this new fortification, which was named in honor of Our Lady of the Conception. It was supported by another fortification, fort São João. In 1840 it had six artillery pieces.

The fort has since been demolished.

== Gallery ==
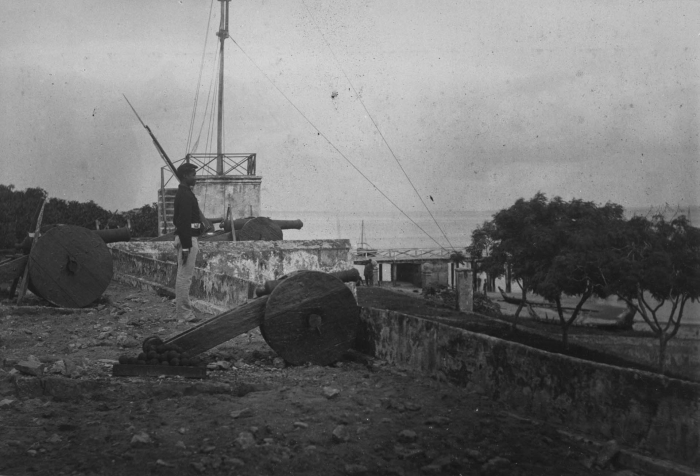
Photograph taken between 1890 and 1910.

== See also ==
- Portuguese Mozambique
