= Fort São José (Encoje) =

Former fort in Angola

Fort São José do Encoje
- Fortaleza de São José do Encoje
- Encoje in Angola

Site information
- Controlled by: Portugal; Angola
- Condition: Ruined

Location
- Coordinates: 7°38′44″S 14°41′34″E

Site history
- Built: 1759

The Fort São José do Encoje, (Fortaleza de São José do Encoje in Portuguese) is located in São José do Encoje, province of Uíge, Angola.

It was established in 1759 to ensure trade with the interior. Built out of stone and lime, it had a square shape with a bastion on each edge, nine artillery pieces and a garrison of 100 to 150 militia. It contained a barracks, a dungeon, guardshouse and the gunpowder magazine. It was ruined by 1906. In 1956 some pieces were relocated to the Museu do Congo in Uíge. It was classified as a national monument on May 30, 1925.

== See also ==
- Portuguese Angola
