= Fort São Tiago Maior =

Former fort of the Portuguese Empire

- Fortaleza de São Tiago Maior
- Tete in Mozambique

Site information
- Controlled by: Portugal; Mozambique

Location
- Coordinates: 16°10′00″S 33°36′00″E

Site history
- Built: 1575

The Fort São Tiago Maior of Tete (Fortaleza de São Tiago Maior do Tete in Portuguese) also known as Tete Fort (Fortaleza de Tete in Portuguese) is a former fort of the Portuguese Empire built in Tete, Tete Province in Mozambique.

Located 600 kilometers from the mouth of the Zambezi River, on its right bank, the fort was first built in 1575 by the initiative of Vasco Fernandes Homem and was restored in 1686. It featured a square shape, measuring 80 to 90 meters long, and round bastions on its four edges. It was repaired in 1837 by order of commander Manuel Correia Monteiro to face the attacks of the Vátuas. It was restored in 1942.

Marquis de Sade mentions the Fort of Tete in his novel Aline et Valcour.

== See also ==
- Portuguese Mozambique
