= Fortaleza de Santo António da Ponta da Mina =

- Ponta da Mina, Príncipe in São Tomé and Príncipe
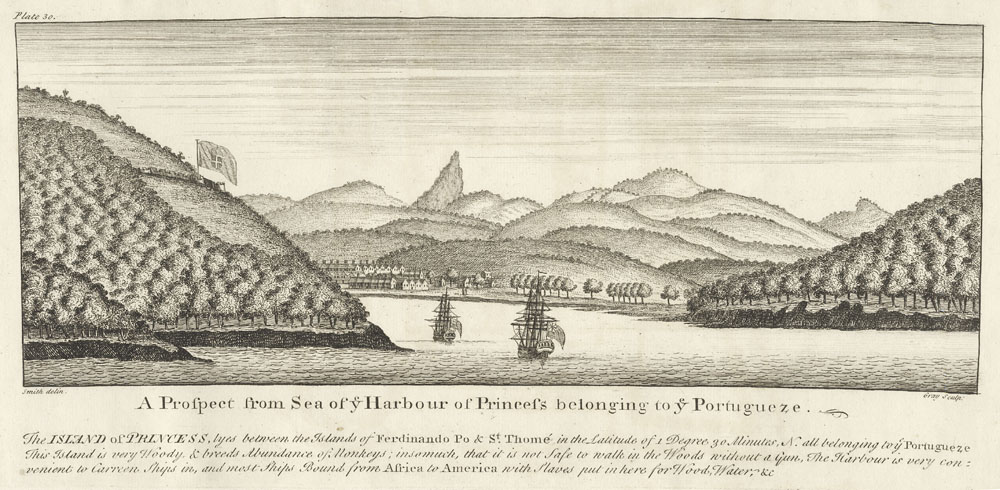
- Entrance to the port of the island of Príncipe (English engraving from 1727), on the left and the mid part, Forte da Ponta da Mina

Site information
- Controlled by: Portuguese Empire
- Condition: Ruined

Location
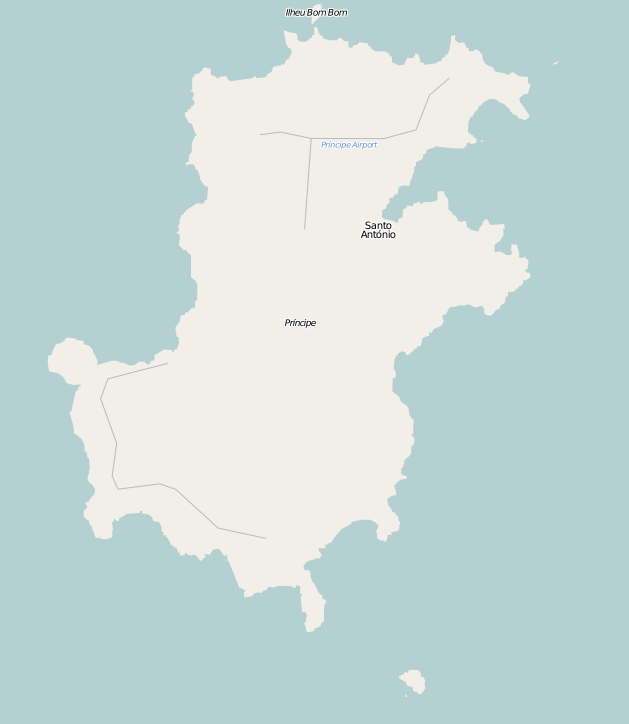
- Coordinates: 1°38′52″N 7°26′16″E

Site history
- Built: 1695
- Events: Spanish War of Succession

The Fortaleza de Santo António da Ponta da Mina or Forte de Ponta da Mina is a ruined fort located east of the island capital Santo António in the island of Príncipe in São Tomé and Príncipe. It is located at the headland Ponta da Mina. The fortress consisted of two parts: the Bateria Real and the Bateria do Príncipe.

The fort was built in 1695. In 1706, the city of Santo António was invaded by the French during the Spanish War of Succession, destroying the town and its fortress. It was repaired several times, and was finally abandoned in the early 20th century.

== See also ==
- Portuguese Empire
- List of buildings and structures in São Tomé and Príncipe
