= Fortaleza de São José da Ponta Grossa =

Fort in Florianópolis, Brazil

- Florianópolis, Santa Catarina in Brazil
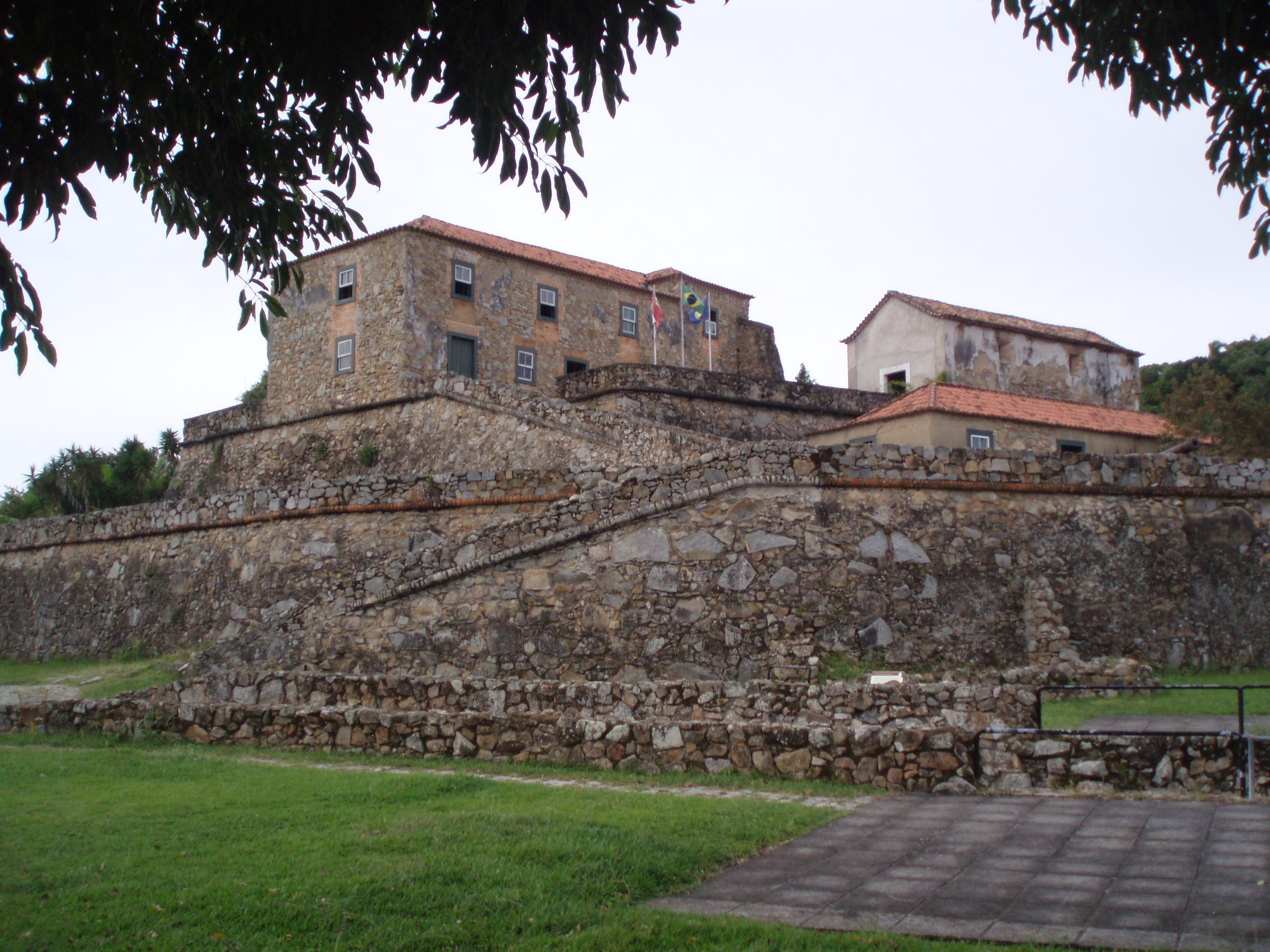
- View of the fort

Site information
- Type: Fort
- Open to the public: Yes
- Condition: Good

Location
- Location of Fortaleza São José in Brazil
- Coordinates: 27.431667°S 48.518333°W

Fortaleza de São José da Ponta Grossa is a fort located on the northern end of Santa Catarina Island in the municipality of Florianópolis, capital of Santa Catarina state, in southern Brazil.

== See also ==
- Military history of Brazil
