= Fort D'El-Rei =

Fort in Mindelo, Cape Verde

- Fortim D'El-Rei
- Mindelo, Cape Verde in Cape Verde
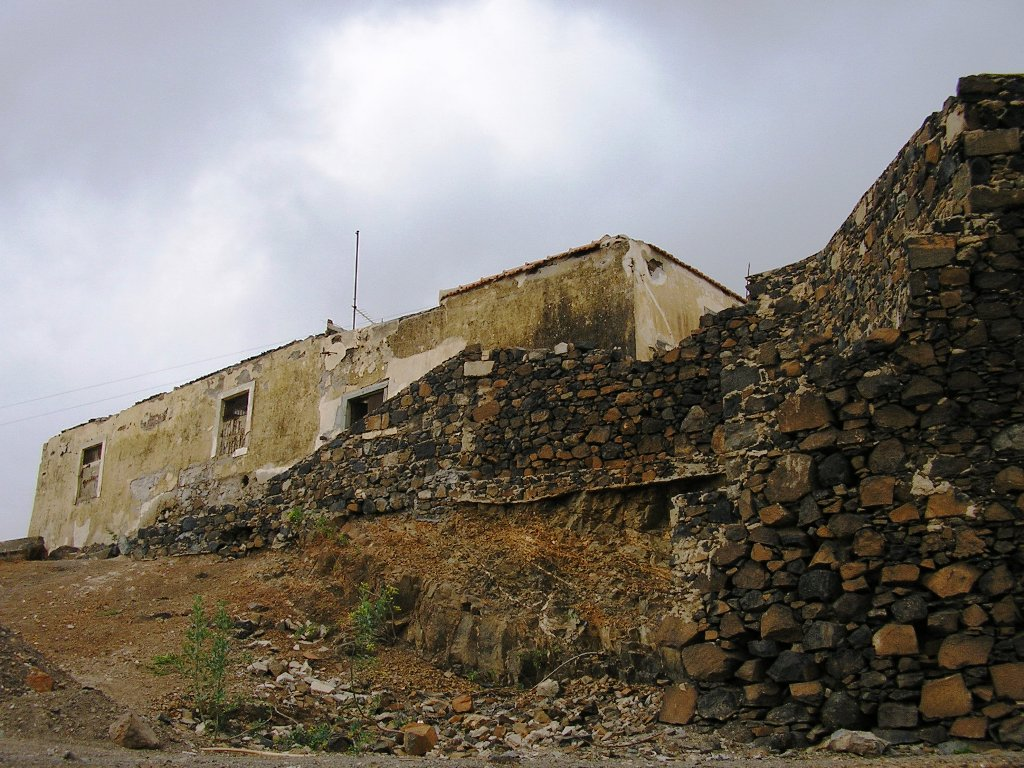

Site information
- Open to the public: Yes
- Condition: ruins

Location
- Coordinates: 16°53′26″N 24°59′35″W

Site history
- Built: 1852-1853

Fort D’El Rei, (Fortim D'El-Rei in Portuguese), also known as Mindelo Fort (Forte do Mindelo in Portuguese) is located in Mindelo, on the Island of São Vicente in Cape Verde.

It was built between 1852 and 1853 and is the oldest construction in the city, having been built to defend the Porto Grande harbour. It had 4 18 caliber guns and three 3 caliber guns. It has a wide panoramic view over the city and the bay.

The fortlet is roughly square in shape, with a 30 meters side and a central courtyard in a single storey plan.

In 1924 it housed the ports signal station. It served as a civil jail between 1930 and 1970, purpose which it lost once the Central Jail of Mindelo was built. In 1934, militia descended from the fortlet onto the city on a food riot incited by a local carpenter, Ambrósio. It's been the object of a possible restoration plan to be used for tourism. As of 2012 it was in ruins.

== See also ==
- Portuguese Cape Verde
