= Fort São Marçal =

Former fort of the Portuguese Empire

- Fortaleza de São Marçal
- Vila de Sena in Mozambique

Site information
- Controlled by: Portugal; Mozambique
- Condition: Ruined

Location
- Coordinates: 17°26′41″S 35°01′50″E

Site history
- Built: 1572

The Fort São Marçal (Fortaleza de São Marçal in Portuguese) also known as Sena Fort (Fortaleza de Sena in Portuguese) is a former fort of the Portuguese Empire built in Vila de Sena, Caia District in Mozambique.

== History ==
Portuguese merchants first settled in the town of Sena in 1521. The fort was originally built out of timber and taipa, in 1572, and contained a church, hermitage and feitoria. It was reconstructed in stone between 1572 and 1590 but having fallen into disrepair by 1618, it was restored in 1704, the maintenance being partly left to the Portuguese settlers of the town.

It featured a square plan and four square bastions, 14 artillery pieces and a garrison of 50 men. On 7 September 1899 the fort was handed over to the Mozambique Company, which refused to maintain anything other than the late 17th century decorated gate-of-arms, citing lack of necessity, as the region had been completely pacified, a situation which was accepted by the Portuguese governor of Mozambique.

In 1969, during the Portuguese Colonial War the Portuguese Army attempted to build in its ruins a new barracks, but this was prevented by the Commission of Monuments and Historical Relics of Mozambique.

In 2008 the government of Mozambique demonstrated interest in restoring its ruins.

== See also ==
- Portuguese Mozambique
