= Fort São Jerónimo (São Tomé and Príncipe) =

- São Tomé and Príncipe
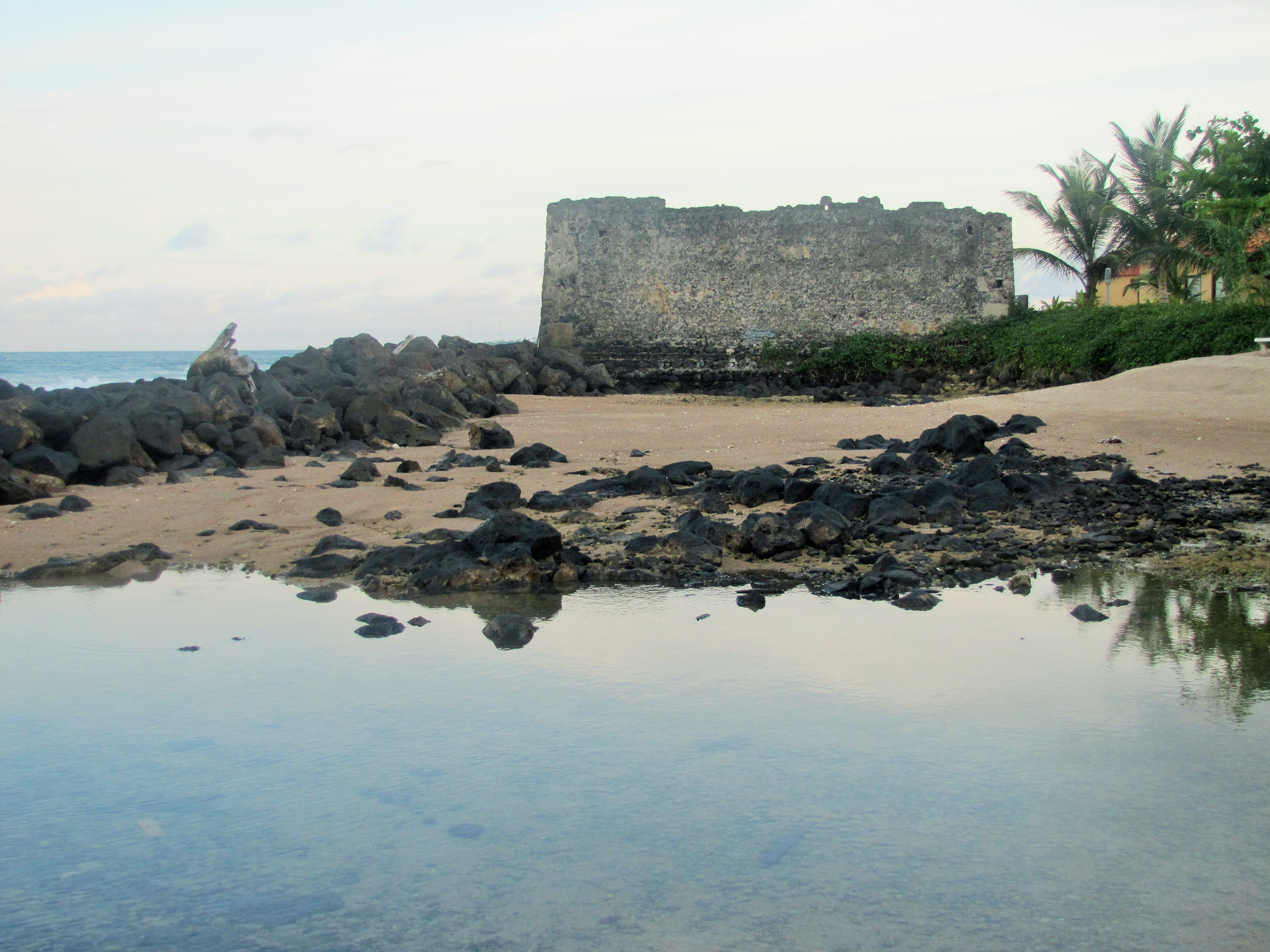

Site information
- Controlled by: Portuguese Empire
- Condition: Ruined

Location
- Coordinates: 0°19′55″N 6°44′32″E

Site history
- Built: 1613

Fort São Jerónimo is a former fort of the Portuguese Empire built on the island of São Tomé in São Tomé and Principe. The fort is located 1.5 kilometers to the south of Fort São Sebastião.

It was built in 1613, during the reign of King Philip I of Portugal, after French privateers attacked the island in 1567, and the revolt of the Angolares in 1574. It was restored in 1801 during the Napoleonic Wars.

It has a square plan and is currently in ruins.

== See also ==
- Portuguese Empire
- List of buildings and structures in São Tomé and Príncipe
