= Gerald Slota =

American artist and photographer (born 1965)

- Known for: Photography and photo-based art, installation art, conceptual photo art
- Website: www.geraldslota.com

Gerald Slota (born 1965) is an American artist and photographer who has been widely exhibited in the United States and internationally. Slota is represented by the Ricco/Maresca Gallery in New York City and the Robert Berman Gallery in Los Angeles. He is known for a deconstructed style of working with his own or found photographs and drawing, cutting, and transforming the images.

His first book, Gerald Slota: Story with Joyce Carole Oates and Chuck Mobley was selected as one of the New York Times "Top Ten Photo Books of 2012".

Slota's works have been included in the collections of the Whitney Museum of American Art, the Los Angeles County Museum of Art (LACMA), the Norton Museum of Art, the George Eastman Museum, and as a billboard with the 2018 Los Angeles Billboard Creative Show and in numerous private collections. He has been commissioned to create original editorial artwork by many national and international publications including the New York Times Magazine, The New Yorker, New York Magazine, Aperture, Vice, and Stern.

== Critical and academic texts ==
- Artforum Donald Kuspit on Gerald Slota, March 2019
- Photograph Magazine, "Gerald Slota; AFTER" by Jean Dykstra Jan/Feb 2019
- The New Yorker, "Telling Stories: The Art of Gerald Slota" by Siobhan Bohnacker.
- The New York Times, "Gerald Slota's Photos Paired With Neil LaBute's Words" by Elaine Louie.
- Aperture, "Because the Darkness Feeds My Soul" with Neil LaBute 2009.
- New York Observer, "The Darkroom: Neil LaBute Follows a Cruel Art Collaboration With a New Play" by Ricardo Bilton.
- Los Angeles Times, "Neil LaBute tries his hand at an art show" by David Ng and Lisa Fung.
- Palm Beach Daily News, "Imaging Eden: How photographers shaped way we see the Everglades" by Jan Sjostrom.
- HyperAllergenic, "Looking Beyond the Myths of the Everglades" by Laura C. Mallonnee.
- "The Photographer's Playbook: 307 Assignments and Ideas" Edited by Jason Fulford, Published by Aperture, 2014.
- "The Unseen Eye Photographs from the Unconscious" by W.M. Hunt, Published by Aperture, 2011.
- "American Perspectives: Photographs from the Polaroid Collection" Published by the Tokyo Photographic Art Museum Museum, 2000.
- "Criticizing Photographs" Fifth Edition, Terry Barrett, Published by McGraw Hill.
- Ricco Maresca In The Company of Two Vivid Imaginations.
- The New York Times, "Once Upon A Time 200 Years Later" by Siobhan Bohnacker.
- The 3200, NYC, Portfolio, Issue 1.
- Blow Photography Magazine, "True" Ireland, Issue 1.
- Bomb Magazine, Portfolio, by Betsy Sussler, Spring 2007.
- George Eastman House Catalogue, Found, by Alison Nordstrom, 2007.
- Fotograf #6, "Found" exhibit review by Dagmar Cujanova, 2005.
- Prague Post, "Ghosts of the Past," review by Mimi Rogers, 2005.
- Fotograph Magazin, "Gerald Slota: Found" by Dagmar Cujano.
- Art in America, Review by Jean Dykstra. 2004.
- Photography in New York: Cover and About the Cover by Jean Dykstra. 2003.
- Art News, "The New Visionaries" by Barbara Pollack. 2003.
- Photography Now, Journal fur Fotografie und Videokunst, "Ordinary Madness" 2003.
- SF Camerawork, "Everyman: A Search for the Male Form" by Nora Kabat. Vol. 29, No.1, Spring/Summer.
- The New York Times, "Amid Fragmentation, Hints of Narrative" by Barry Schwabsky, 1997
- The Record, "Picasso with a Camera" by Mary Jane Fine, September 24, 1996
- The New York Observer, "Gerald Slota's Residue of Tales; It's Not Art Brut, It's Art" by A.D. Coleman, January 15, 1996.

== Selected solo exhibitions ==
2018
AFTER, Ricco/Maresca Gallery, New York
2013
STORY, Ricco/Maresca Gallery, New York
STORY, Castell Photography, Asheville, North Carolina
2012
STORY, SF Camerawork, San Francisco, CA
HOME. SWEET. HOME., Robert Berman Gallery, Santa Monica, CA
2010
HOME. SWEET. HOME. Ricco/Maresca Gallery, New York
URBANIA, Paterson Museum, Paterson, NJ
2008
URBANIA, Quality Pictures and Contemporary Art, Portland, OR
2007
FOUND,, Hasted/Hunt Gallery, New York
2006
FOUND, Project Space, George Eastman House, Rochester, NY
2005
FOUND, Langhans Galerie, Prague, CZ
2004
FABLE, Robert Berman Gallery, Santa Monica, CA
2003
FABLE, Ricco/Maresca Gallery, New York
2000
GONE, Ricco/Maresca Gallery, New York
1999
CRACKED, Robert Berman Gallery, Santa Monica, CA
1998
SMASHED, Ricco/Maresca Gallery, New York
1997
ORDINARY MADNESS, Allan P. Kirby Arts Center Gallery, Lawrenceville, NJ
1996
TRUE, Ricco/Maresca Gallery, New York

== Commissioned works ==
- New York Magazine, The Haunting of 657 Boulevard in Westfield, New Jersey Artwork by Gerald Slota 2018
- Vice, Exorcism. Photographs by Gerald Slota and Tim Freccia. The Photo Issue 2013.
- New Yorker, A Mistake by Awhile Sharma, Photograph by Gerald Slota.
- New Yorker, The Itch by Atul Gawnde, Photograph by Gerald Slota.
- New York Times Magazine, The Bipolar Puzzle by Jennifer Egan, Photographs by Gerald Slota.
- The New York Times, Maybe Just Drunk Enough to Remember by John Eligon, Photograph by Gerald Slota.
- The New York Times, In a Eulogy, Finding A Person by Sandeep Jauihar, Photograph by Gerald Slota.
- The New York Times, Is Hysteria Real? by Erika Kinetz, Photograph by Gerald Slota.
- The New York Times, Nurses Step Up Efforts Against Attacks by David Tuller Photograph by Gerald Slota.
- New York Magazine, The Mother Smotherer by Sam Anderson Photograph by Gerald Slota.
- Washington Post. Cracked by Ruben Castaneda, Photograph by Gerald Slota.

== Awards and honors ==
- Society for Photographic Education Speaker November 2018
- Mid-Atlantic Grant: New Jersey State Council on the Arts Fellowship – 2001, 2009
- Polaroid 20 x 24 Studio – Summer 1997
- MacDowell Colony – Summer 1997
