= Fort Santo António (Ibo) =

Portuguese fort

Fort Santo António of Ibo
- Fortaleza de Santo António do Ibo
- Ibo (Mozambique) in Mozambique
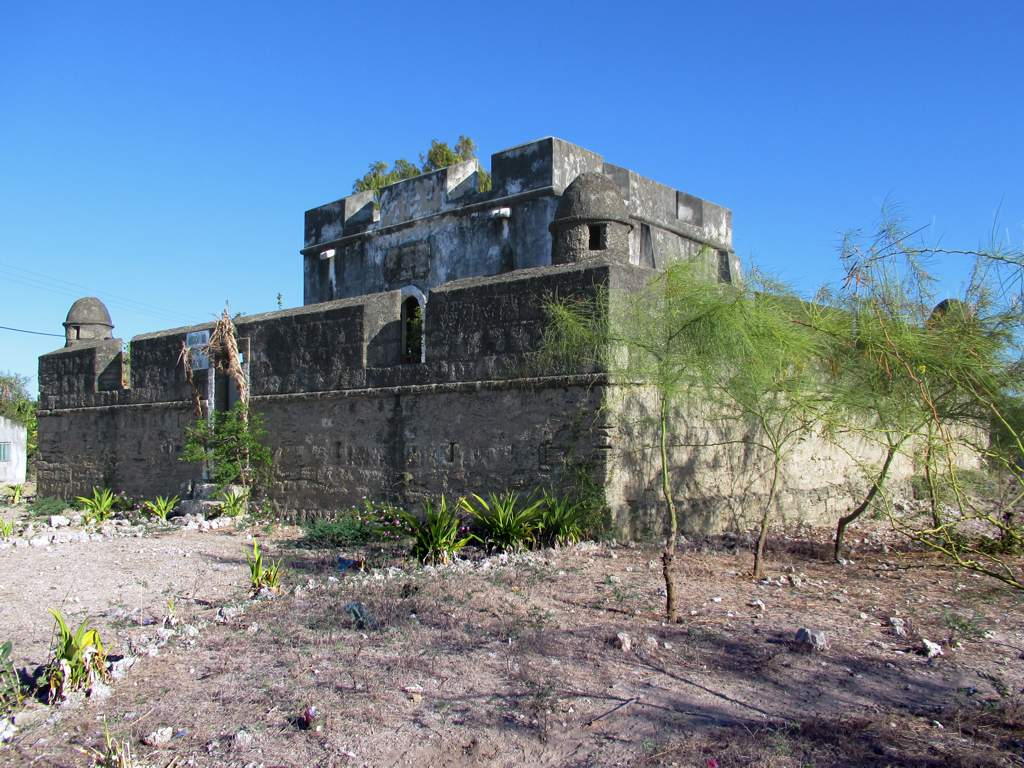

Site information
- Controlled by: Portugal; Mozambique
- Condition: Ruined

Location
- Coordinates: 12°20′42″S 40°35′22″E

Site history
- Built: 1819
- Built by: Portuguese Empire

The Fort Santo António of Ibo (Fortaleza de Santo António do Ibo in Portuguese) is the most recent of the three forts built by the Portuguese Empire on Ibo Island, Cabo Delgado Province in Mozambique.

== History ==
The fort was built in 1819 and funded by the Portuguese inhabitants of the town. Among the enemies of the settlement were Sakalava pirates from Madagascar.

It is a small fort, bearing a square shape, 16,75 meters wide and 17,35 meters long, the walls 1,93 meters high, and the parapet 1,43 meters high, while containing a tower 3,5 meters high which rises in the center of the fort, 7,58 meters wide and 7,64 meters deep, topped by a mast meant to fly a flag. It was restored in 1847 by order of governor Ferrari, who had a stone inscription placed on the fort which reads: "Made in 1847 by T. V. N. Ferrari, Gov. of These Islands".

It was heavily armed, with 19 guns: 11 in the walls and 8 in the tower.

== Gallery ==
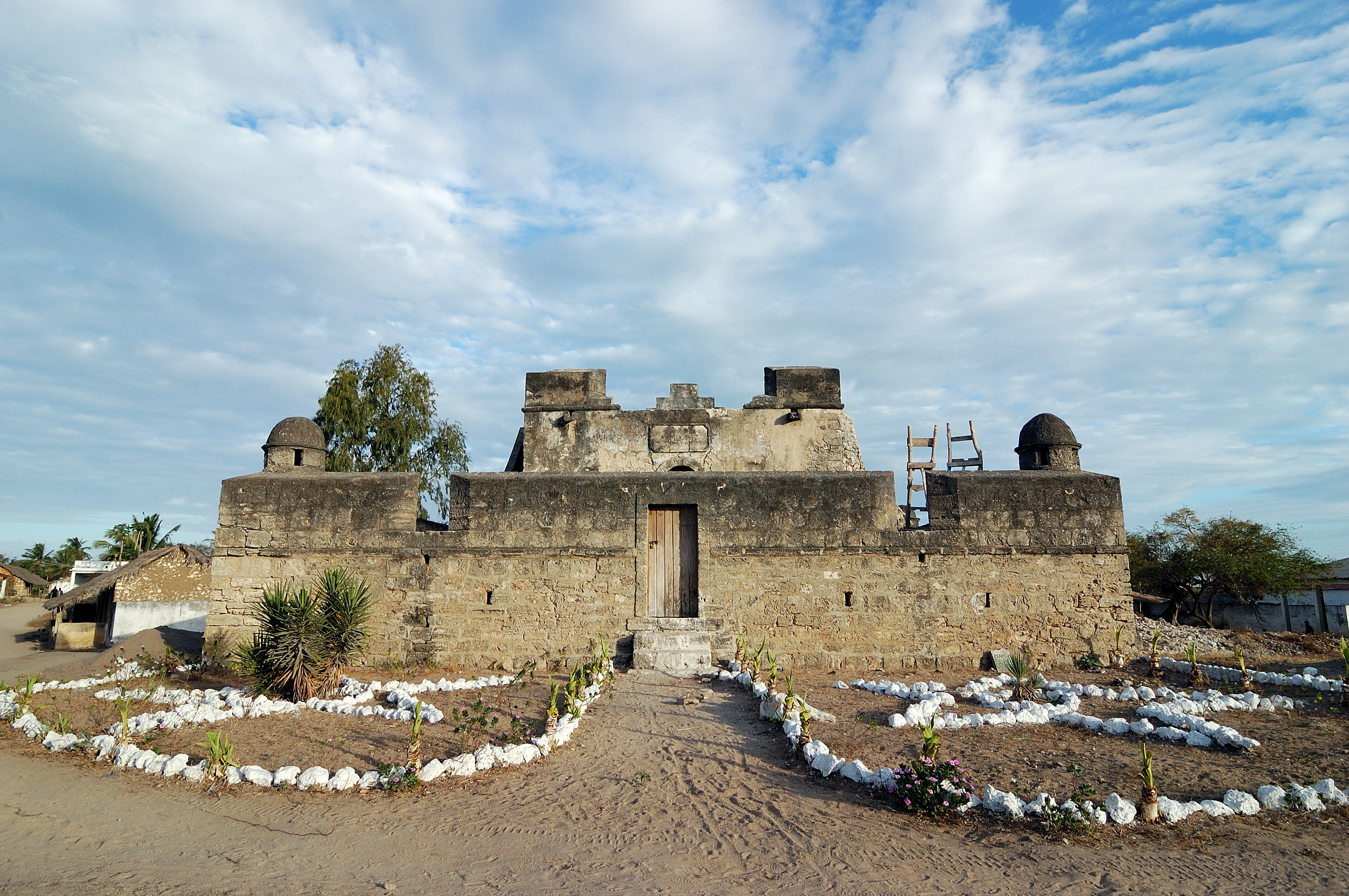

== See also ==
- Portuguese Mozambique
- Quirimbas Islands
- Fort São José (Ibo)
- Fort São João Baptista (Ibo)
