= List of lighthouses in Mozambique =

This is a list of lighthouses in Mozambique.

== Lighthouses ==
| Name | Image | Year built | Location & coordinates | Class of light | Focal height | NGA number | Admiralty number | Range nml |
|---|---|---|---|---|---|---|---|---|
| Angoche Port Office Lighthouse | | n/a | Angoche; 16°13′56.5″S 39°54′11.9″E | Fl (2) G 6s. | 11 metres (36 ft) | 31700 | D6591.4 | 4 |
| Baizos da Boa Paz Lighthouse | | 1940 | Gaza Province; 24°57′48.9″S 34°10′12.0″E | Fl (3) W 10s. | 54 metres (177 ft) | 31828 | D6524 | 15 |
| Baixo Ribeiro Lighthouse | | 1914 est. | Maputo Province; 25°54′41.6″S 32°48′07.9″E | Iso WR 5s. | 15 metres (49 ft) | 31868 | D6500 | white: 15 red: 12 |
| Barra Sul Range Front Lighthouse | | n/a | Inhaca Island; 25°58′15.4″S 32°59′00.8″E | Oc R 4s. | 11 metres (36 ft) | 31884 | D6508 | 12 |
| Cabo Bazaruto Lighthouse | | 1913 | Bazaruto Island; 21°31′57.6″S 35°29′10.1″E | Fl (3) W 30s. | 116 metres (381 ft) | 31788 | D6540 | 23 |
| Cabo das Correntes Lighthouse | | n/a | Inhambane Province; 24°06′12.4″S 35°29′56.5″E | Fl (4) W 10s. | 34 metres (112 ft) | 31816 | D6530 | 13 |
| Cabo Delgado Lighthouse | | 1931 | Cape Delgado; 10°41′29.6″S 40°38′16.4″E | Fl (2) W 12s. | 42 metres (138 ft) | 31536 | D6648 | 16 |
| Cabo da Inhaca Lighthouse | | 1926 | Inhaca Island; 25°58′36.0″S 32°59′18.8″E | Fl (2+1) W 15s. | 109 metres (358 ft) | 31848 | D6492.1 | 23 |
| Cabo Melamo Lighthouse | | n/a | Nacala; 14°24′37.3″S 40°48′16.4″E | Iso W 4s. | 10 metres (33 ft) | 31608 | D6611 | 14 |
| Canal da Polana Lighthouse | | n/a | Maputo; 25°57′58.1″S 32°37′26.5″E | Oc W 8s. | 20 metres (66 ft) | 31876 | D6503 | 25 |
| Catembe Range Rear Lighthouse | | 1893 est. | Maputo; 26°00′23.0″S 32°33′45.7″E | Oc R 4s. | 30 metres (98 ft) | 31888 | D6508.1 | 12 |
| Fernão Veloso Lighthouse | | n/a | Nacala; 14°27′32.4″S 40°40′30.8″E | Fl R 3s. | 8 metres (26 ft) | 31628 | D6611.6 | 6 |
| Ilha Epidendron Lighthouse | | n/a | Zambezia Province; 17°05′17.9″S 39°07′07.2″E | Fl (2) R 8s. | 31 metres (102 ft) | 31712 | D6582 | 8 |
| Ilha do Fogo Lighthouse | | n/a | Zambezia Province; 17°14′00.4″S 38°52′56.4″E | Fl WRG 12s. | 35 metres (115 ft) | 31716 | D6580 | white: 14 red: 10 green: 11 |
| Ilha de Goa Lighthouse | | 1876 | Island of Mozambique; 15°03′11.9″S 40°47′10.0″E | Fl (2) W 12s. | 30 metres (98 ft) | 31661 | D6598.1 | 16 |
| Ilha do Ibo Lighthouse | | 1873 est. | Ibo Island; 12°19′54.9″S 40°37′22.2″E | Fl W 12s. | 18 metres (59 ft) | 31568 | D6636 | 10 |
| Ilha de Mafamede Lighthouse | | 1924 est. | Angoche; 16°21′11.2″S 40°01′47.9″E | Fl (2) R 10s. | 24 metres (79 ft) | 31704 | D6590 | 12 |
| Ilha Medjumbe Lighthouse | | 1934 est. | Medjumbe Island; 11°48′57.9″S 40°36′29.9″E | Fl (2) W 15s. | 32 metres (105 ft) | 31564 | D6640 | 10 |
| Ilha Tambuzi Lighthouse | | 1934 est. | Tambuzi Island; 11°22′06.2″S 40°39′03.0″E | Fl (2) W 10s. | 37 metres (121 ft) | 31556 | D6642 | 11 |
| Ilha Timbué Lighthouse | | 1924 est. | Zambezia Province; 18°48′48.0″S 36°20′48.0″E (NGA) | Fl W 8s. | 41 metres (135 ft) | 31752 | D6564 | 13 |
| Ilha Vamizi Lighthouse | | n/a | Vamizi Island; 11°00′36.0″S 40°42′54.0″E (NGA) | Fl (2) W 6s. | 13 metres (43 ft) | 31540 | D6647 | 8 |
| Luz do Cais Lighthouse | | 1980 | Maputo; 25°58′38.0″S 32°34′10.3″E | Fl (2) G 6s. | 9 metres (30 ft) | 31896 | D6514 | 4 |
| Machesse Lighthouse | | n/a | Sofala Province; 19°16′50.4″S 35°33′06.0″E (NGA) | Fl (2) W 10.1s. | 47 metres (154 ft) | 31756 | D6563 | 14 |
| Macuse Lighthouse | | n/a | Macuse; 17°46′40.6″S 37°11′05.1″E | Fl W 3s. | 21 metres (69 ft) | 31724 | D6575 | 4 |
| Moçambique Capitania do Porto Lighthouse | | n/a | Island of Mozambique; 15°01′56.6″S 40°44′05.3″E | F G | 15 metres (49 ft) | 31680 | D6604 | 5 |
| Monte Belo Lighthouse | | 1914 | Gaza Province; 25°11′19.9″S 33°30′06.8″E | Fl W 4.5s. | 93 metres (305 ft) | 31832 | D6522 | 20 |
| Monte Parapato Lighthouse | | n/a | Angoche; 16°13′37.4″S 39°54′41.4″E | Fl W 4s. | 67 metres (220 ft) | 31692 | D6591 | 9 |
| Mucoque Lighthouse | | n/a | Vilankulo; 21°58′57.4″S 35°19′23.5″E | Fl R 2s. | 17 metres (56 ft) | 31796 | D6544 | 5 |
| Pinda Lighthouse | | 1923 | Memba District; 14°12′38.1″S 40°42′37.0″E | Fl (2) W 10s. | 64 metres (210 ft) | 31604 | D6618 | 24 |
| Ponta Ali Said Lighthouse | | 1900 est. | Porto Amelia; 12°55′44.0″S 40°30′37.0″E | Fl G 4s. | 10 metres (33 ft) | 31580 | D6628 | 5 |
| Ponta da Barra Lighthouse | | ~1945 | Inhambane Province; 23°47′35.9″S 35°32′15.5″E | Fl (3) W 10s. | 25 metres (82 ft) | 31812 | D6532 | 29 |
| Ponta da Barra Falsa Lighthouse | | 1931 | Inhambane Province; 22°56′44.1″S 35°35′34.9″E | Fl (2) W 10s. | 123 metres (404 ft) | 31804 | D6536 | 18 |
| Ponta Caldeira Lighthouse | | 1926 | Moma District; 16°39′24.1″S 39°30′30.6″E | Fl (3) R 10s. | 50 metres (160 ft) | 31708 | D6586 | 18 |
| Ponta Ingomaimo Lighthouse | | 1931 | Sofala Province; 20°42′49.1″S 34°59′39.8″E | Fl W 6s. | 43 metres (141 ft) | 31784 | D6546 | 13 |
| Ponta Maunhane Lighthouse | | 1932 | Pemba; 12°58′19.6″S 40°35′12.7″E | Fl W 5s. | 23 metres (75 ft) | 31592 | D6624 | 16 |
| Ponta Matirre Lighthouse | | 1913 | Zambezia Province; 17°16′42.0″S 38°11′00.9″E | Fl (2+1) W 12s. | 50 metres (160 ft) | 31720 | D6576 | 13 |
| Ponta Mepira Lighthouse | | n/a | Pemba; 12°57′49.0″S 40°28′52.4″E | Fl R 2s. | 5 metres (16 ft) | 31588 | D6632 | 5 |
| Ponta Namalungo Lighthouse | | 1937 | Nampula Province; 15°38′07.7″S 40°24′54.7″E | Fl (4) W 15s. | 84 metres (276 ft) | 31684 | D6596 | 10 |
| Ponta Namuaxi Lighthouse | | n/a | Nacala; 14°31′33.5″S 40°39′21.8″E | Fl G 4s. | 5 metres (16 ft) | 31363 | D6614 | 5 |
| Ponta Onlungune Lighthouse | | n/a | Nampula Province; 14°40′45.1″S 40°50′08.4″E | Fl (3) W 13.5s. | 14 metres (46 ft) | 31640 | D6610 | 10 |
| Ponta do Ouro Lighthouse | | 1942 | Ponta do Ouro; 26°51′28.2″S 32°53′16.9″E | Fl (2) W 10s. | 114 metres (374 ft) | 31928 | D6488 | 15 |
| Ponta Sacamulo Lighthouse | | n/a | Nacala; 14°28′06.0″S 40°40′00.0″E | Fl G 3s. | 8 metres (26 ft) | 31612 | D6612 | 5 |
| Ponta São Sebastião Lighthouse | | n/a | Vilanculos District; 22°16′24.0″S 35°31′54.0″E | Fl (5) W 15s. | 38 metres (125 ft) | 31800 | D6538 | 12 |
| Ponta Uifundo Lighthouse | | n/a | Mecúfi; 13°24′06.0″S 40°34′18.0″E (NGA) | Fl (2) W 16s. | 34 metres (112 ft) | 31596 | D6622 | 11 |
| Ponta Zavora Lighthouse | | 1910 | Inhambane Province; 24°31′23.7″S 35°11′50.0″E | Fl W 10s. | 67 metres (220 ft) | 31820 | D6528 | 19 |
| Ponta Zuani Lighthouse | | n/a | Nacala; 14°30′00.0″S 40°40′12.0″E | Fl R 4s. | 5 metres (16 ft) | 31632 | D6613 | 5 |
| Rio Macuti Lighthouse | | 1904 | Beira; 19°50′37.3″S 34°53′58.6″E | Fl (3) W 10s. | 36 metres (118 ft) | 31764 | D6553 | 19 |
| Sancul Range Rear Lighthouse | | n/a | Lumbo; 15°03′24.2″S 40°41′38.8″E | Fl W 4s. | 21 metres (69 ft) | 31656 | D6602.1 | 5 |
| Sangage Lighthouse | | 1925 | Angoche; 16°00′4.3″S 40°07′41.6″E | Fl W 5s. | 93 metres (305 ft) | 31688 | D6592 | 19 |
| Savane Lighthouse | | n/a | Sofala Province; 19°39′18.0″S 35°10′18.0″E | L Fl W 12s. | 31,760 metres (104,200 ft) | 31760 | D6562 | 7 |
| Vilhena Lighthouse | | 1909 est. | Quelimane; 18°05′47.6″S 36°55′18.5″E | Fl (2) W 12s. | 31 metres (102 ft) | 31740 | D6570 | 14 |

== See also ==
- List of lighthouses in Tanzania (to the north)
- List of lighthouses in South Africa (to the south)
- Lists of lighthouses and lightvessels
