= Fort São José (Ibo) =

Portuguese fort

Fort São José of Ibo
- Fortim de São José do Ibo
- Ibo (Mozambique) in Mozambique
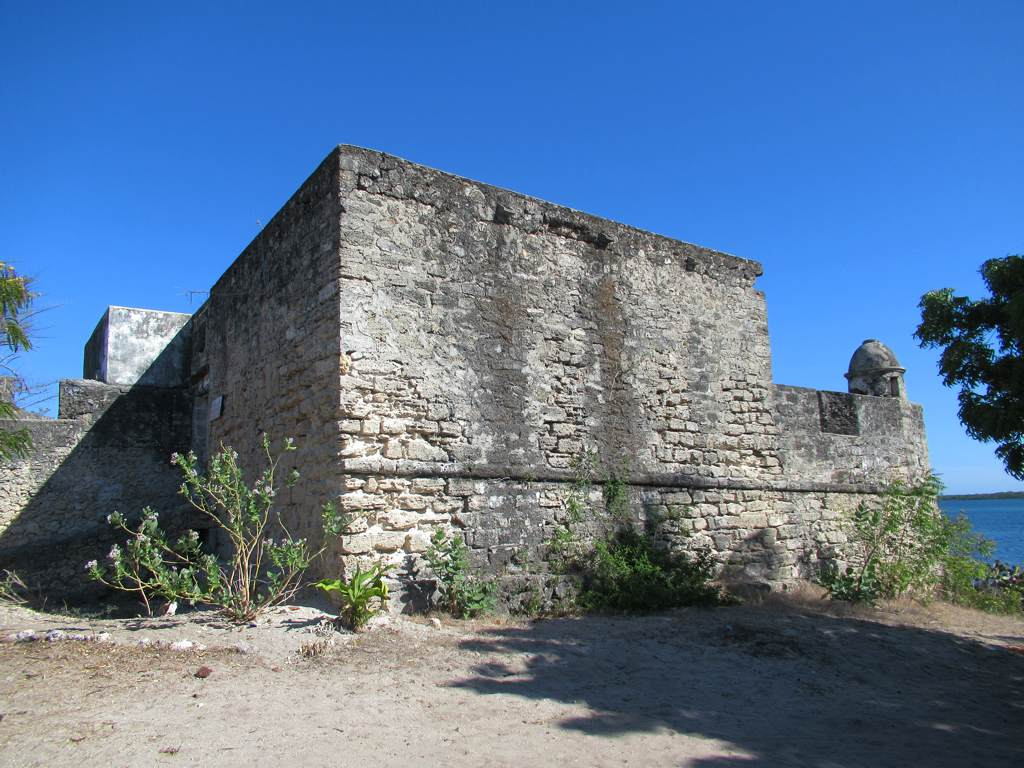

Site information
- Controlled by: Portugal; Mozambique
- Condition: Good

Location
- Coordinates: 12°20′41″S 40°34′58″E

Site history
- Built: 1764
- Built by: Portuguese Empire

The Fort São José of Ibo (Fortim de São José do Ibo in Portuguese) is one of the three forts built by the Portugal on Ibo Island, Cabo Delgado Province in Mozambique.

== History ==
It was the first fort to be built on Ibo Island, in 1764, to defend the Portuguese settlers and their trade from French, English or Madagascar pirates, and it is located by the islands harbour. Initially named Fort Santa Bárbara by governor Caetano Alberto Júdice who had it built, by 1809 it became known as São José.

It lost its military function when the fort São João Baptista was built in 1791.

The fort has an approximately rectangular plan, containing the troops' barracks and warehouse, and it was equipped with seven small-caliber iron guns. The corners facing the sea being surmounted by watchhouses. It was restored in 1945 by the Mozambican Historical Monuments and Relics Commission, demolishing the buildings that had been erected between 1899 and 1900 that had de-characterized it.

== See also ==
- Portuguese Mozambique
- Quirimbas Islands
