= Tourism in Mozambique =

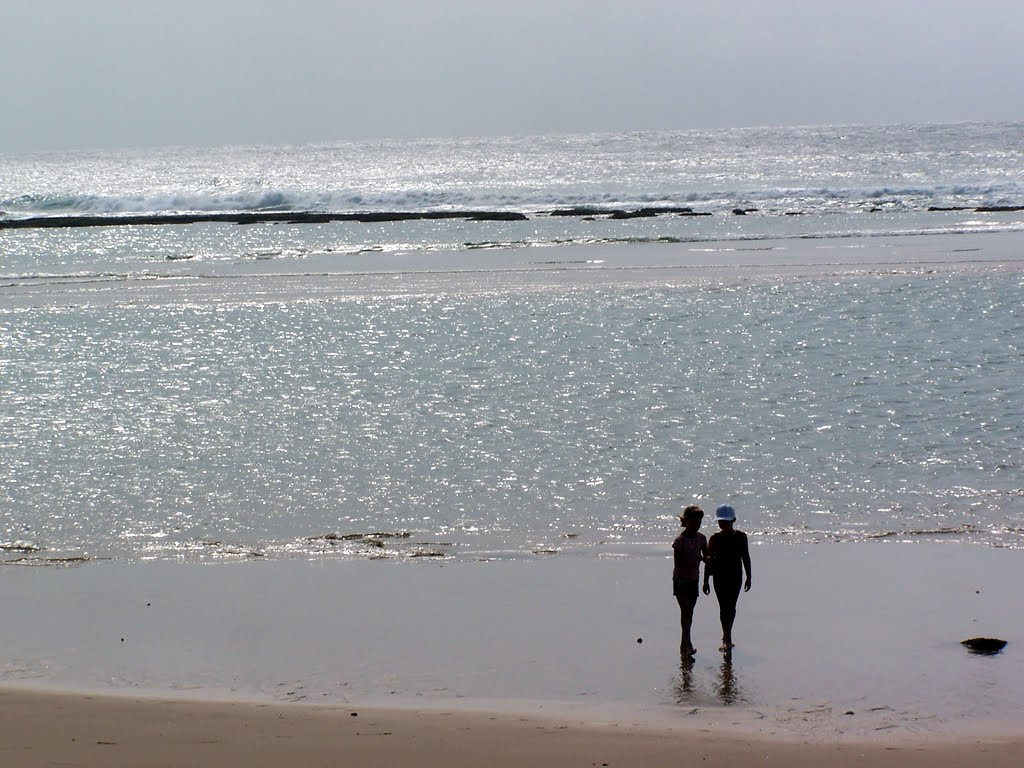
Beach near Maputo

The tourism assets of Mozambique include the country's natural environment, wildlife, and cultural heritage, which provide opportunities for beach, cultural, and eco-tourism.

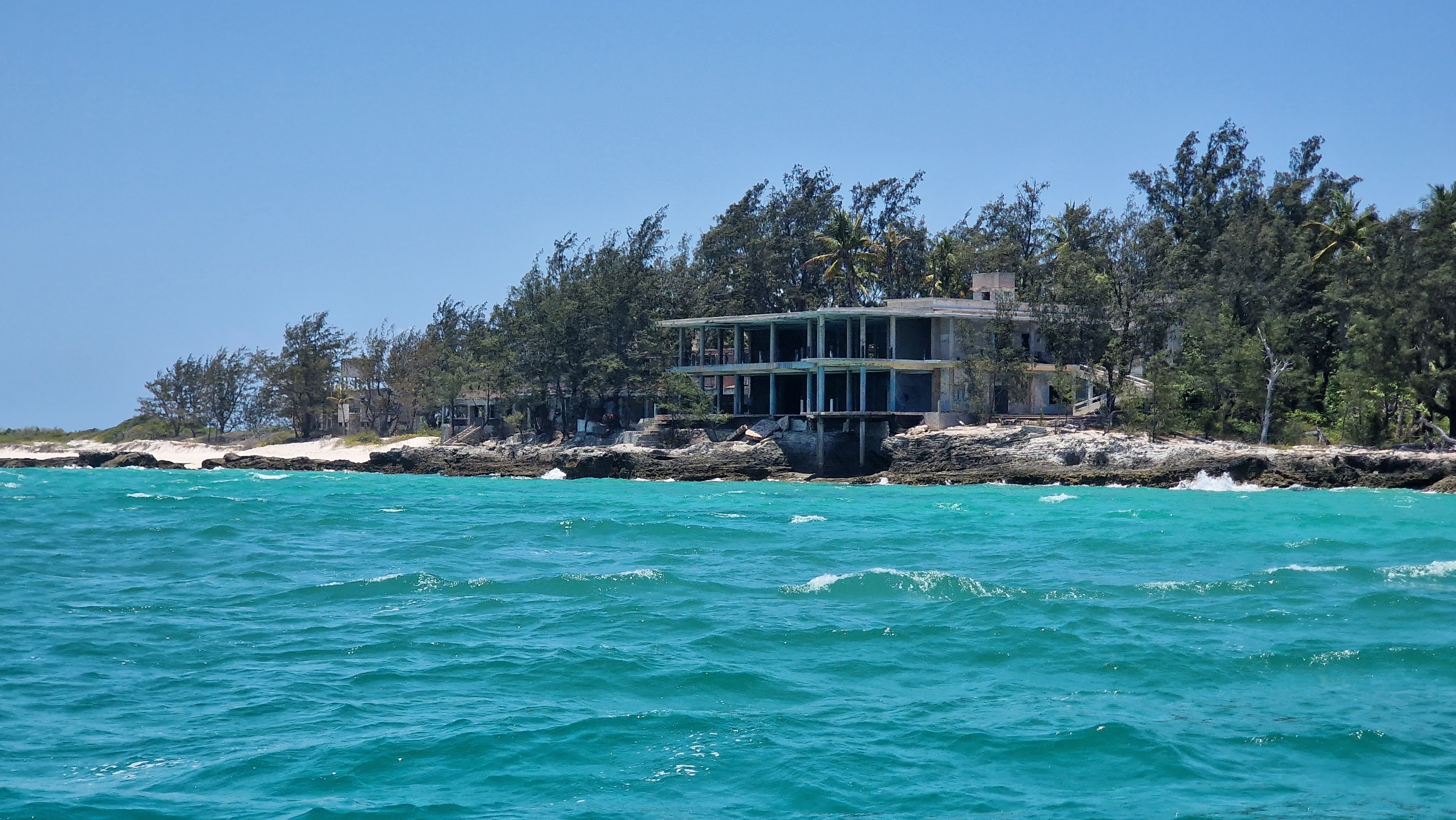
View of Santa Carolina Island

== History ==
Traditional wooden fishing boat on the sandy shoreline of Bazaruto Island, Mozambique.

Despite its tourism assets and its proximity to South Africa, one of the world's top tourist destinations, Mozambique has the lowest tourist numbers of all its neighbours except Malawi. Tourism was a very profitable industry in the pre-independence period. Rhodesians and South Africans visited Beira and Mozambique's southern beaches. Gorongosa National Park, halfway between Zimbabwe and Beira was a large tourist attraction.

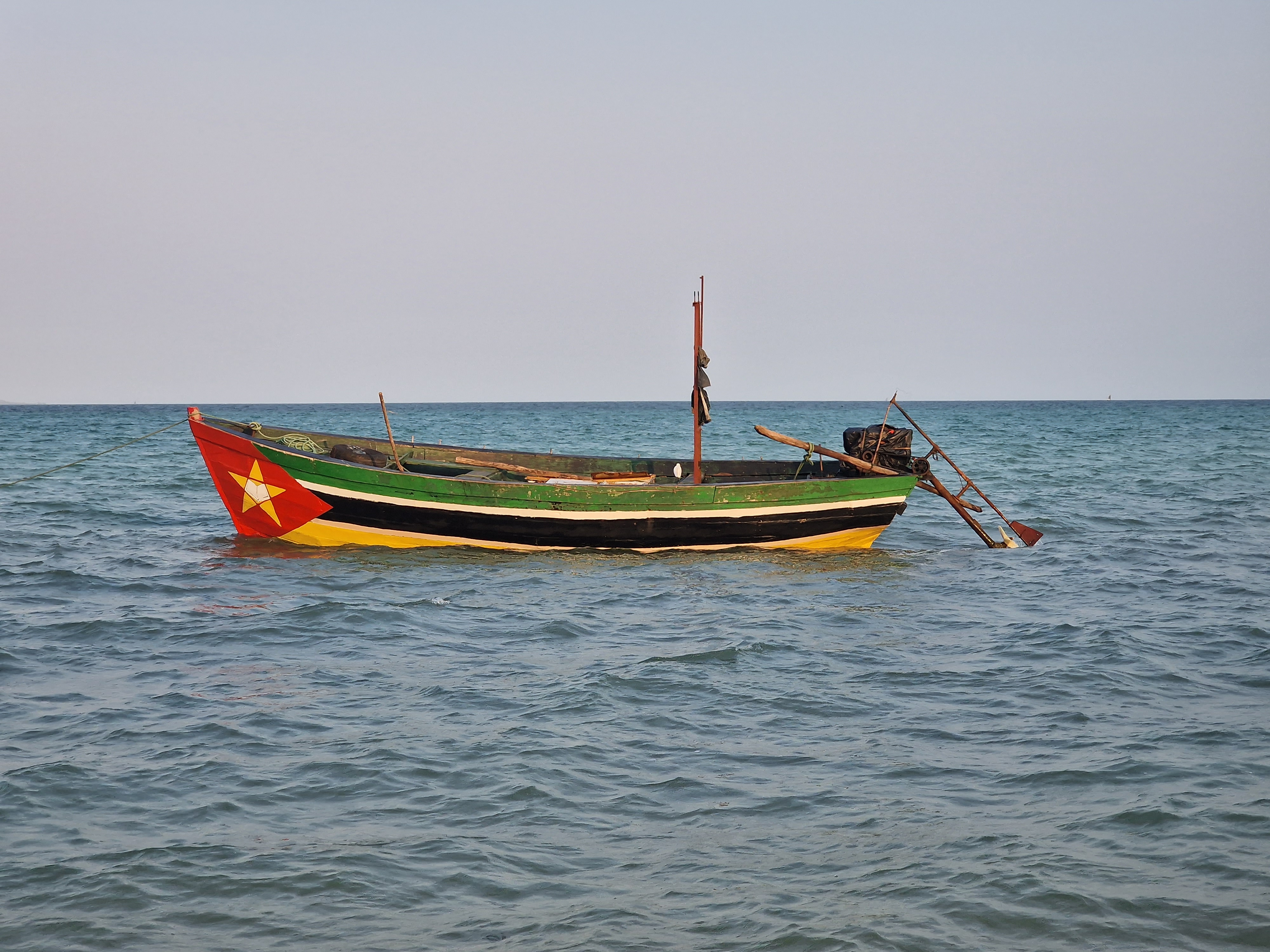
Mozambican fishing boat

After independence from Portugal in 1975, the Mozambican Civil War that took place in the newly independent country between 1977 and 1992 decimated the tourism industry and wildlife conservation in Mozambique. Organized tourist travel in the country had ceased by 1978. The confidence of tourist operators has been growing since the end of civil conflict in the country, and the country now has the opportunity to revamp and further develop its tourist industry. Inadequate marketing budgets and a lack of tour operators limit the growth of the tourism industry.

By the end of the 1990s tourism was the fastest growing sector of Mozambique's economy. A Minister for Tourism was appointed in 1999. In 2003 tourism accounted for about 1.2% of the country's GDP, far below the Sub-Saharan average of 6.9%. In 2005 the tourist industry grew by 37%, the fastest tourist industry growth rate in the world. The industry attracts more foreign investment than any other part of the country's economy. Tourist arrivals in the country numbered 240,000 in 1999. UNWTO figures suggest approximately 578,000 tourists, an increase of 23% from 2004. Tourism receipts in 2001 were US$64 million and in 2005 were US$130 million. The sector employs 32,000 people. About one-third of the country's visitors are from South Africa.

Between 2000 and 2015, Mozambique was among the fastest-growing economies in Sub-Saharan Africa, with an average annual GDP growth rate of 7.3%. Pre-COVID-19, tourism in Mozambique was stable and climbing; in 2018 alone, Mozambique welcomed 2.743 million tourists. The COVID-19 pandemic severely impacted worldwide travel, and Mozambique was no exception. While 2018 and 2019 were record years for the country's tourism sector, in 2020 the GDP growth rate fell to -1.2%. The tourism sector's financial contribution to Mozambique's GDP in 2020 fell to below 1%. However, in 2021 the economy showed signs of improvement, with tourism accounting for 1.2% of the GDP.

There are about 7,700 hotel beds in the country, with an approximate occupancy rate of just below 40%. The capital Maputo has about half of the hotel nights. It is slow and expensive to access land for new hotel developments. Many tourist operators supply their own power. Air access is limited, with only one connection to Portugal other than regional services to Dar es Salaam, Harare, Johannesburg and Nairobi. Flight prices are high. Domestic air transport is very limited, although the price of fares is limited because of new small air carriers. The country's visa regulations are a problem for the tourist industry because many other countries near to it, such as Mauritius, Seychelles, and the Maldives, do not require European Union citizens to have visas.

The government hopes that the country's game and nature reserves will become a major tourist attraction. Despite game numbers being decimated during the wars there is positive growth in many of the nation's parks, especially the Maputo Special Reserve, and Gorongosa Parks.

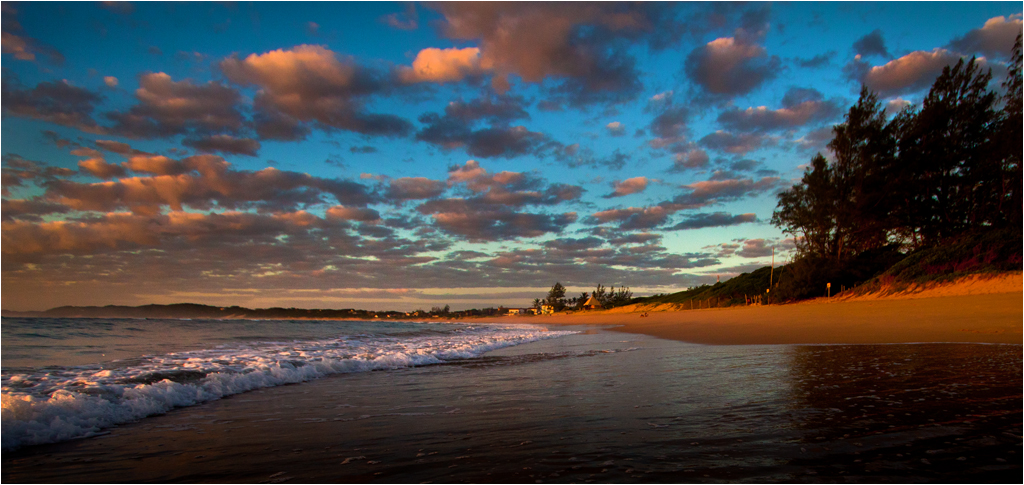
Ponta do Ouro, Mozambique

== National Parks ==
- Great Limpopo Transfrontier Park (currently in progress), a 35,000 km^{2} peace park between Mozambique, South Africa, and Zimbabwe
- Ambatakum National Park in Namaca
- Banhine National Park (Parque Nacional de Banhine) in Dambi
- Chimanimani National Park, the reserve on Mozambique's side of the Chimanimani Mountains
- Gilé National Reserve (Reserva do Gilé) in Nipula
- Gorongosa National Park (Parque Nacional da Gorongosa) in Goinha
- Karingani Game Reserve in Chicuane
- Limpopo National Park (Parque Nacional de Limpopo) in Bingo
- Maputo National Park (Parque Nacional de Maputo) in Maputo
- Marromeu Game Reserve in Maconharumo
- Mount Mabu in Tacuane
- Pomene National Reserve in Macanzele
- Quirimbas National Park (Parque Nacional das Quirimbas) in Olumbua
- Zinave National Park (Parque Nacional de Zinave) in Tanguane

== Areas of interest ==
=== Cabo Delgado ===
- Pemba
- Quirimbas Islands
- Quirimbas National Park

=== Gaza Province ===
- Banhine National Park
- Limpopo National Park
- Xai-Xai

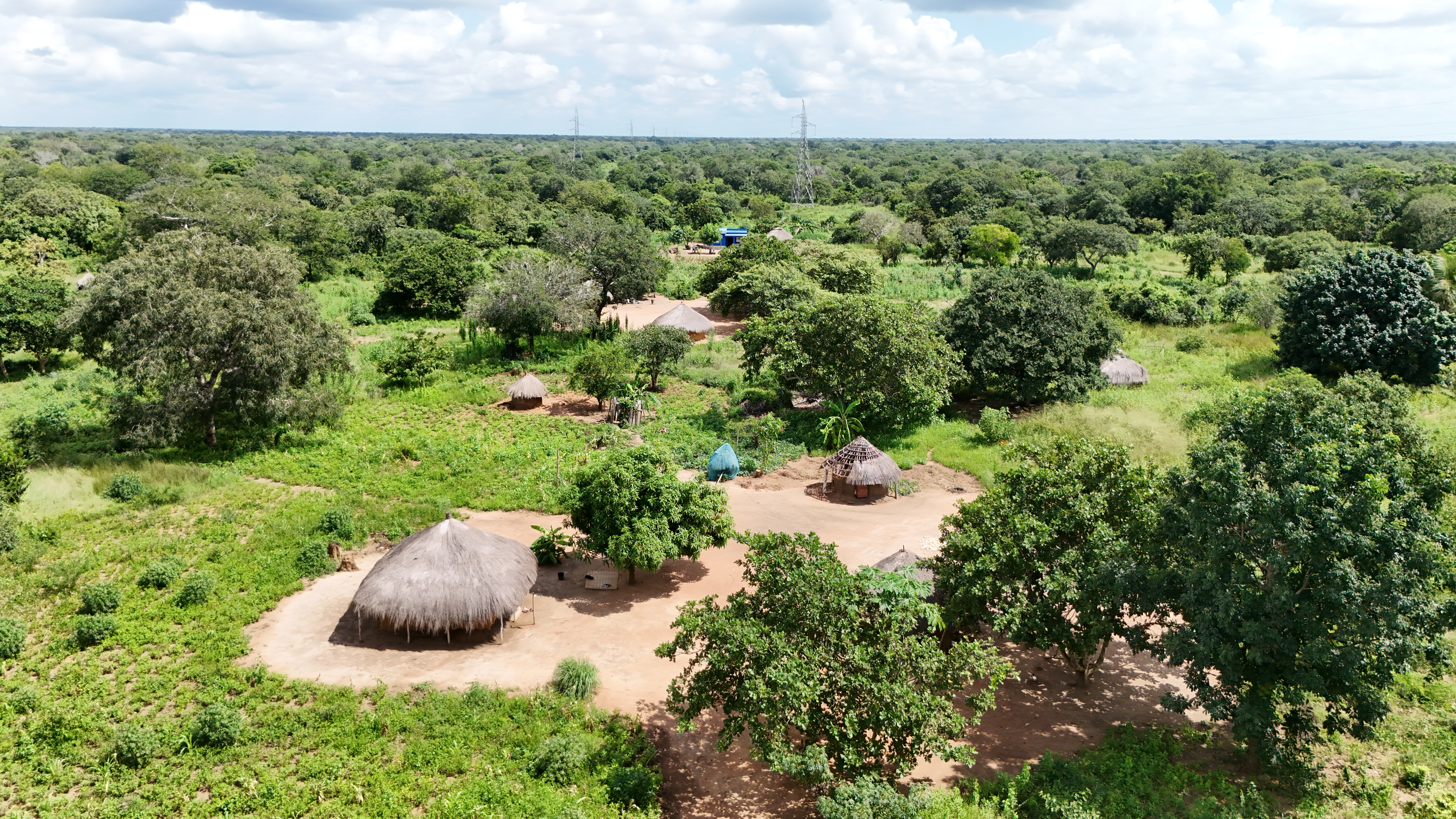
Local houses in a Mozambican village

=== Inhambane ===
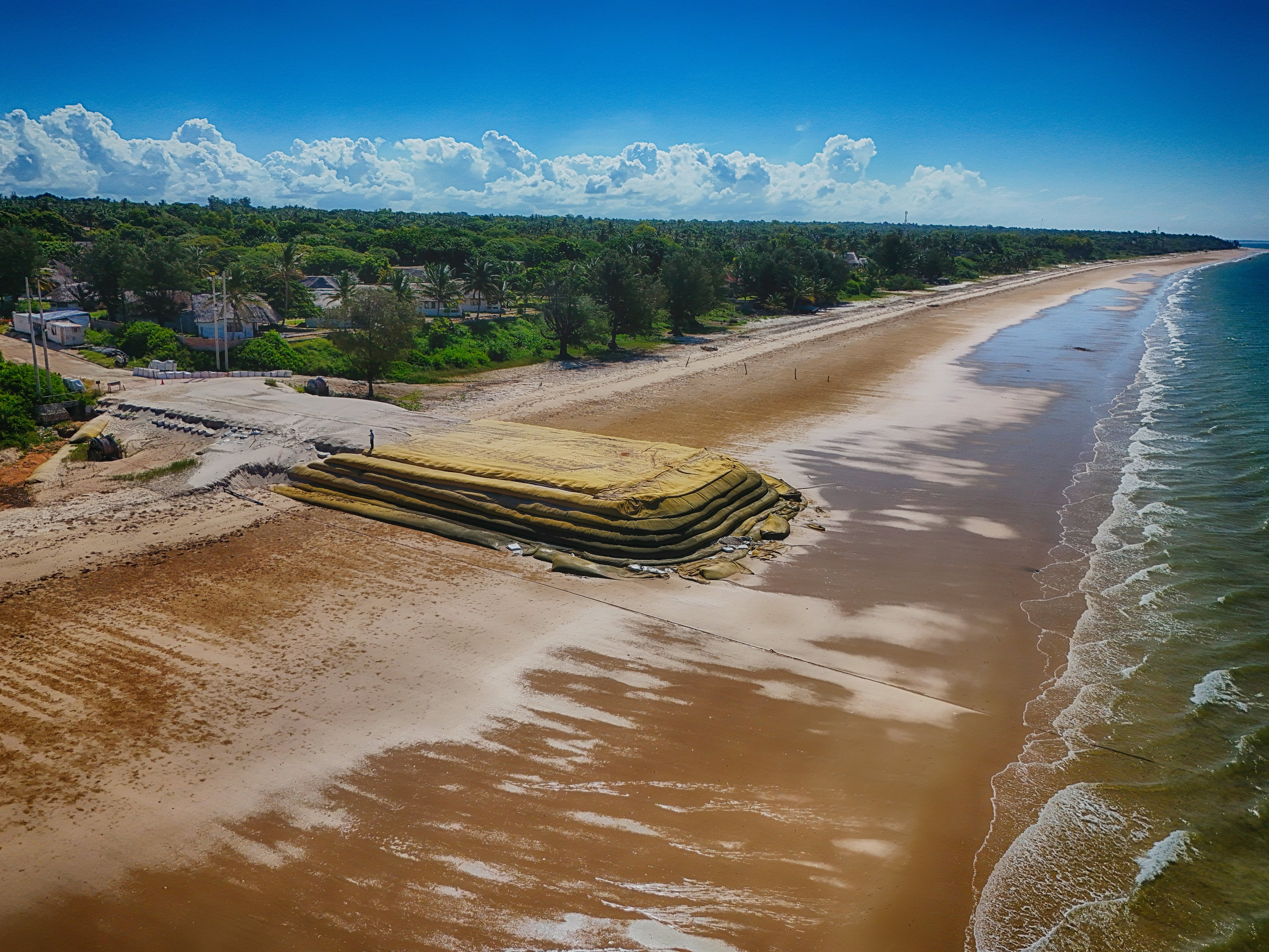
The pier at Inhassoro, Mozambique.

- Banhine National Park
- Bazaruto Archipelago
- Bazaruto National Park
- Inhambane
- Pomene National Reserve
- Tofo
- Vilankulo

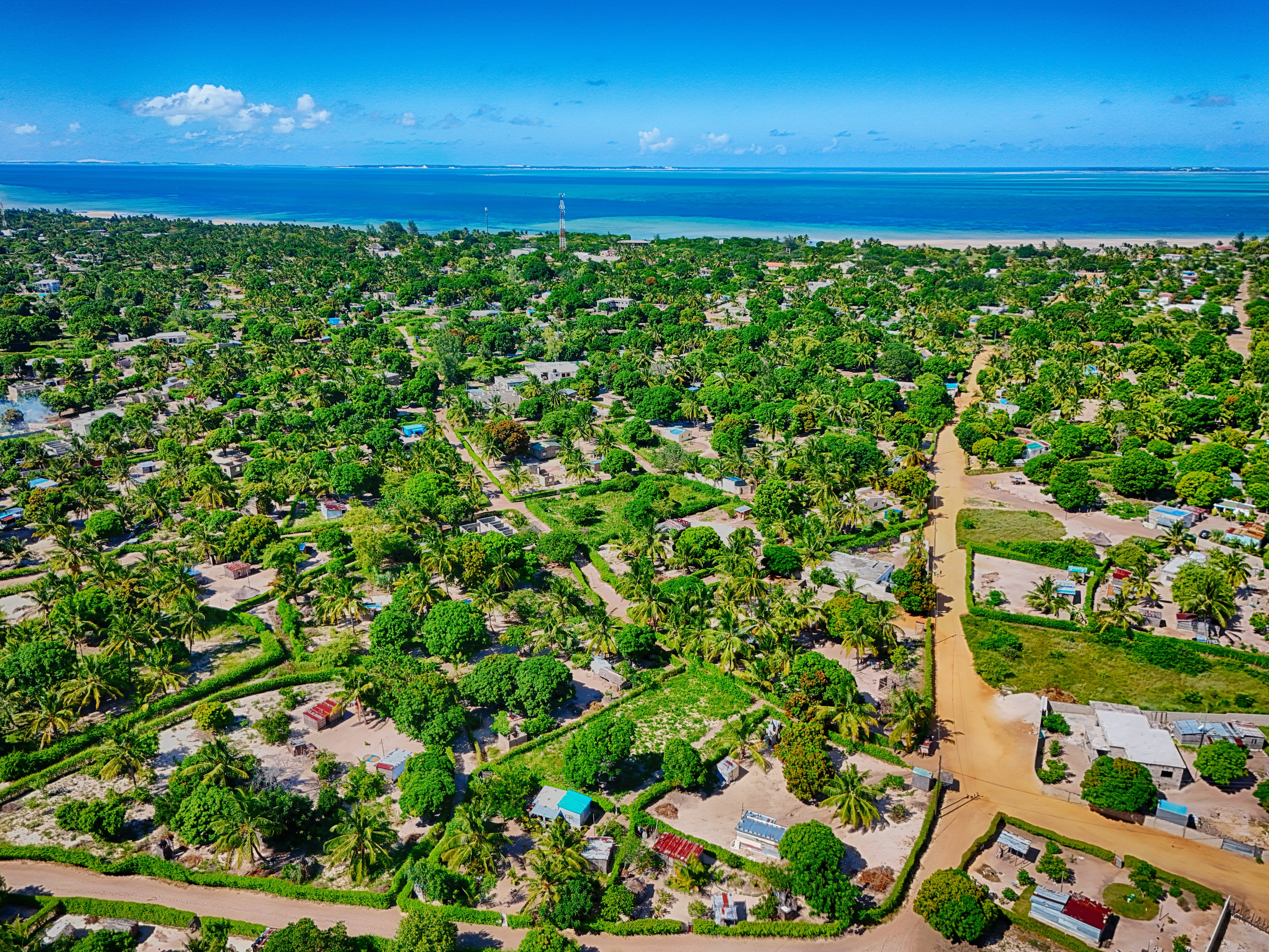
Residential area of Vilanculos, a key tourist location in Mozambique.

- Zinave National Park

=== Manica ===
- Chimanimani National Reserve

=== Maputo ===
- Inhaca Island
- Maputo Protection Area
- Maputo Special Reserve

=== Niassa ===
- Niassa Reserve

=== Ponta do Ouro ===
- Ponta do Ouro

=== Sofala ===
- Gorongosa National Park
- Marromeu Buffalo Reserve

=== Vamizi ===
- Vamizi Island

=== Zambezia ===
- Gilé National Reserve

== Statistics ==
Number of International Arrivals
Year	International Arrivals
2025	1.270.000
2024	1.098.000
2023	1.153.698
2022	461.438
2021	492.000
2020	952.000
2019	2.032.923
2018	2.870.000
2017	1.514.000
2016	1.715.000
2015	1.634.000
2014	1.751.000
2013	1.970.000
2012	2.206.000
2011	2.013.000
2010	1.836.000
2009	1.711.000
2008	1.439.000
2007	1.259.000
2006	1.095.000
2005	954.000
2004	711.000
2003	726.000
2002	943.000
2001	404.000
1999	240.000

Share of International Tourist Arrivals by Origin (in %)
Country	2023	2020
South Africa	33,5	60
Portugal	10,3	4
United Kingdom	6,2	2
Italy	4,4	
Brazil	3,8	
India	2,6	
China	2,3	
Zimbabwe		11
United States		2

Share of GDP from Tourism
Year	% of GDP
2023	4,02
2022	4,5
2021	2,8
2020	2,7
2019	4,7
2018	4,7
2017	4,3
2015	5,2
