= Barra Beach =

Praia da Barra Miramar Barra Lighthouse
- Nickname: BARRA
- Location within Mozambique
- Coordinates: 23°47′41″S 35°32′17″E
- Country: Mozambique
- Provinces: Inhambane Province

Area
  - City: 12 km^{2} (4.6 sq mi)
  - Land: 8 km^{2} (3.1 sq mi)
  - Water: 5 km^{2} (1.9 sq mi)
- Elevation: 0 m (0 ft)

Population
  - City: 10,000
  - Urban: 2,000
- Time zone: +1
- Postal code: 1307
- Area code: +258

Barra Beach (Portuguese: Praia da Barra) or simply Barra is a tourist beach in southeastern Mozambique. This holiday settlement lies on the Indian Ocean coast, on the Ponta da Barra peninsula in Inhambane Province, 25 km drive from Inhambane city. A major Mozambican tourist destination, Barra is home to beach resorts, private vacation homes, restaurants and diving charters. Snorkeling is popular below the Barra Lighthouse at low tide where there is a natural tidal pool. The wreck of the SS Inharrime, an Italian built cargo ship that ran aground in 1949, lies exposed nearby. The Barra and Tofo area is one of the global hotspots for divers to see whale sharks, sea turtles and manta rays.

== Tropical Cyclone Dineo ==
On 15 February 2017 Tropical Cyclone Dineo reached the Mozambican Coast. Barra was near the epicentre and many resorts, homes and trees were destroyed or damaged. The local fishing community was severely affected.

== See also ==
- Inhambane
