= Kenneth (disambiguation) =

Kenneth is a masculine given name. It may also refer to:

== Places in the United States ==
- Kenneth, Minnesota, a city
- Kenneth City, Florida, a town

== Storms ==
- List of storms named Kenneth

== See also ==
- Inch Kenneth, an island off the west coast of the Isle of Mull
