= Medjumbe Island =

Island in Mozambique

Coordinates: 11.816276°S 40.603924°E

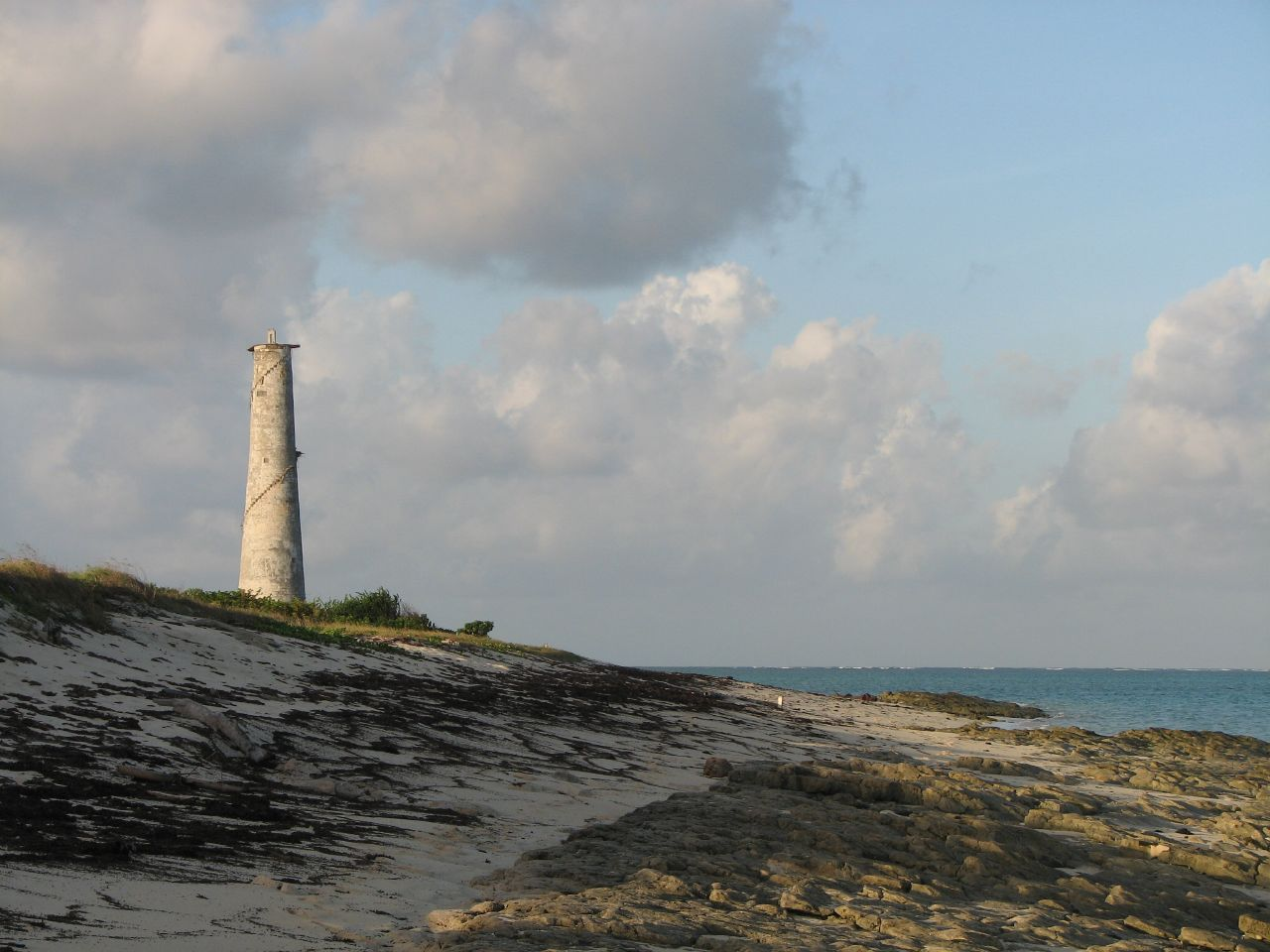
Medjumbe Lighthouse was built in the 1930s, worked for 3 months, broke down and has been there ever since without working.

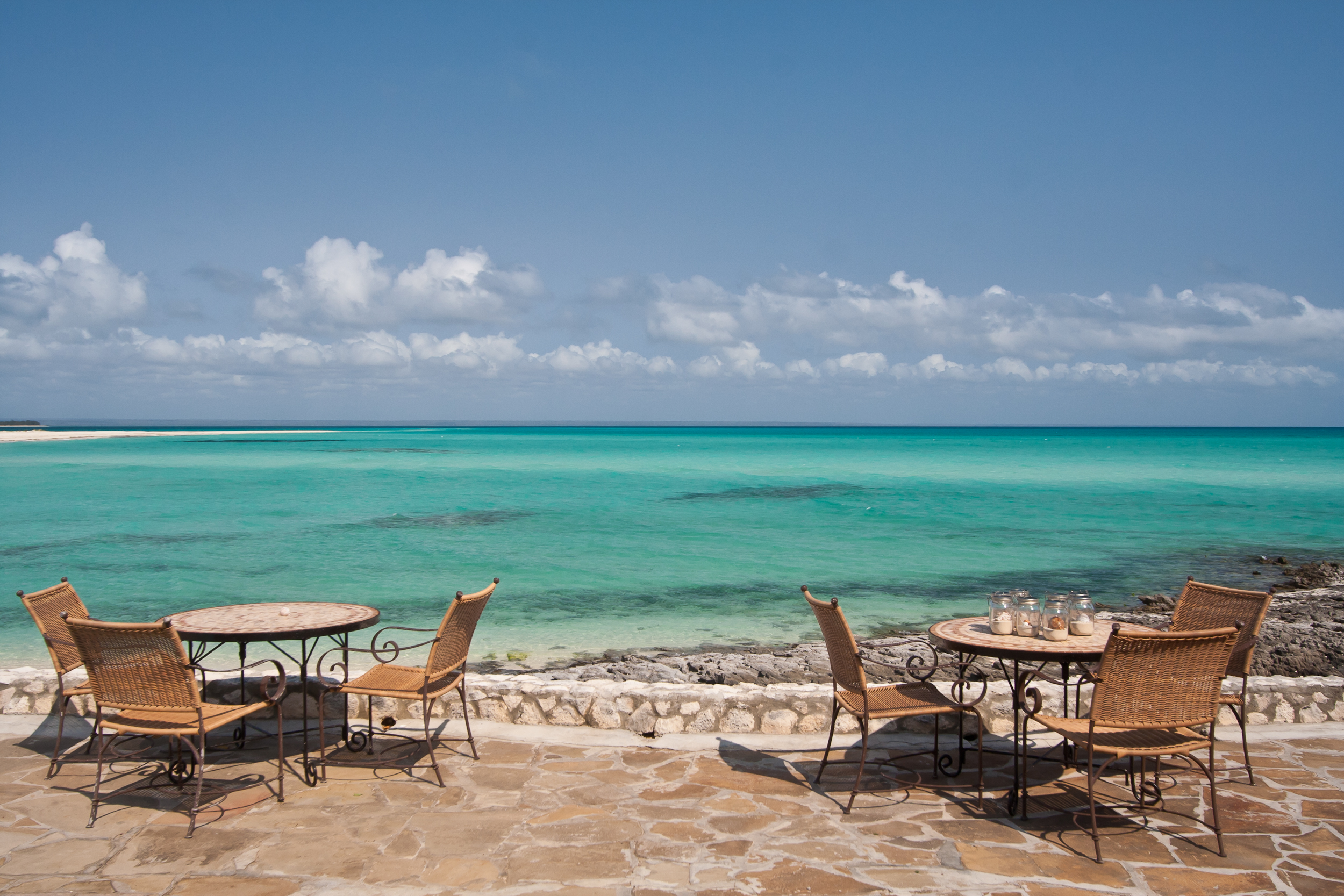
View from the Island resort pool deck.

Medjumbe Island (Kisiwa cha Medjumbe, in Swahili) is one of the Quirimbas Islands off the northern coast of Mozambique, within the Quirimbas National Park. It is privately owned, operated as an exclusive resort. Accommodations are 13 thatched wooden chalets. The island is 1 kilometre (0.62 mi) long and 500 metres (1,600 ft) wide. It is surrounded by spectacular coral reefs. Tourist activities include diving and snorkeling, windsurfing and deep sea fishing.
