= Barra Lighthouse, Mozambique =

Barra Lighthouse Farol da Ponta da Barra
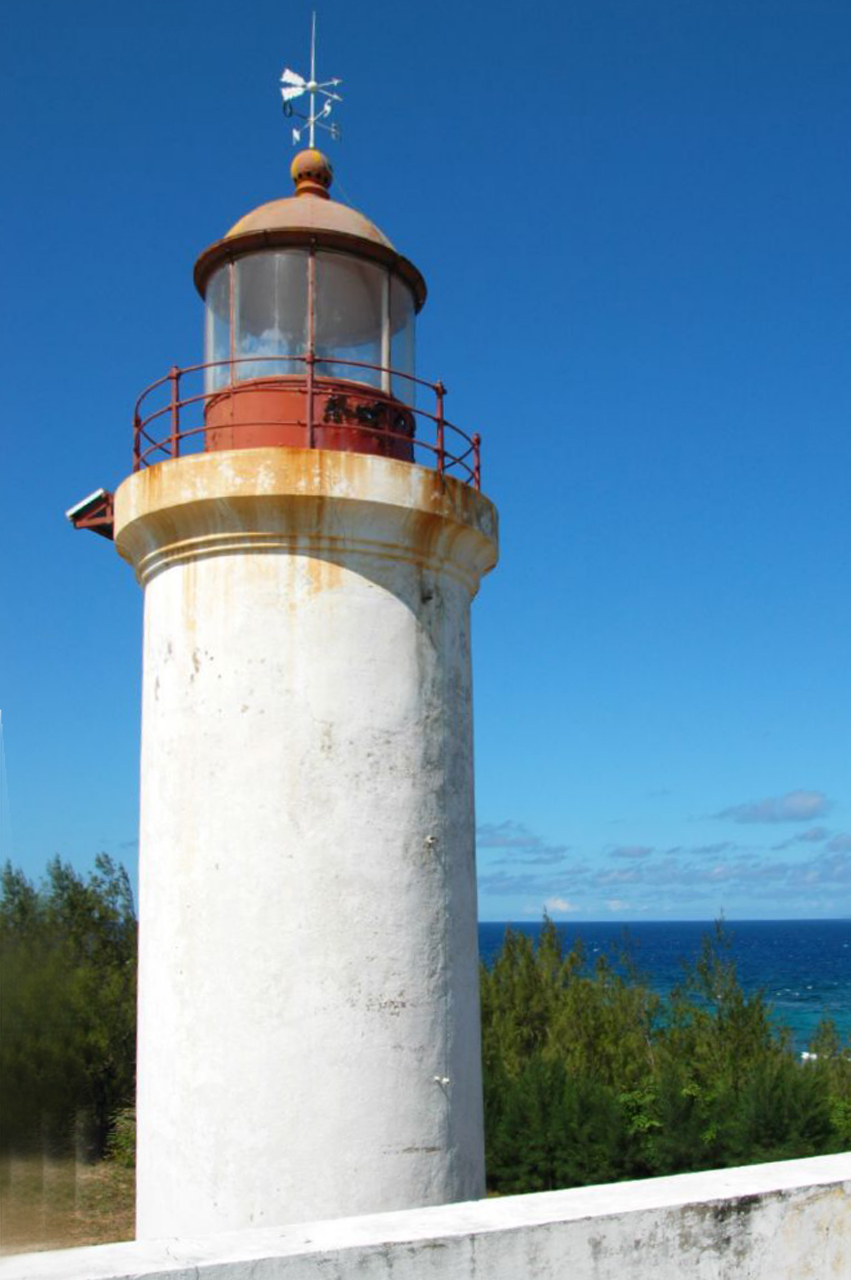
- Barra Lighthouse, 2006
- Location: Inhambane Province, Mozambique
- Coordinates: 23°47′30″S 35°32′18″E

Tower
- Constructed: 1900
- Height: 25 metres (82 ft)
- Shape: Round tower
- Markings: White

Light
- Range: 29 nautical miles (54 km; 33 mi)
- Characteristic: Fl (3) W 10.

Barra Lighthouse (Portuguese: Farol da Ponta da Barra) is a lighthouse in southeastern Mozambique. The lighthouse stands on the Indian Ocean coast, at Barra Beach on the Ponta da Barra peninsula in Inhambane Province, 25 km drive from Inhambane city. The beach is a major Mozambican tourist destination. Snorkeling is popular below the lighthouse at low tide where there is a natural tidal pool. The wreck of the SS Inharrime, an Italian-built cargo ship that ran aground in 1949, lies exposed nearby. The Barra and Tofo area is one of the global hotspots for divers to see whale sharks, sea turtles and manta rays.
