= Matemo Island =

Island in Mozambique

Native name: Kisiwa cha Matemo
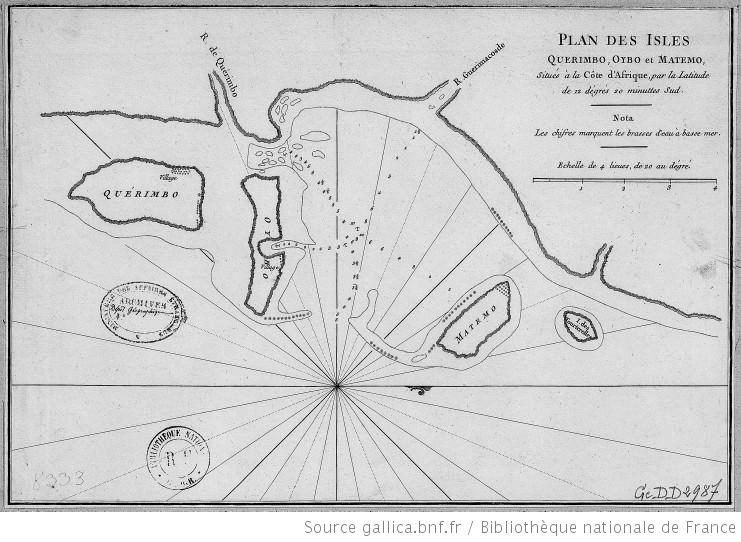

Geography
- Coordinates: 12.22°S 40.59°E
- Archipelago: Quirimbas Islands
- Area: 24 km^{2} (9.3 sq mi)

Administration
- Mozambique

Matemo Island (Kisiwa cha Matemo, in Swahili) forms part of the pristine Quirimbas Islands and is located northeast of Ibo island, in northern Mozambique, about 100 km from the city of Pemba. It is approximately 24 square kilometres in area, with palm groves and beaches.

It contains five villages, inhabited by native Mozambicans, as well as the Matemo Island Resort, falling within the Rani Resorts group.
