= Fort São João Baptista (Ibo) =

Portuguese fort

Fort São João Baptista of Ibo
- Fortaleza de São João Baptista do Ibo
- Ibo (Mozambique) in Mozambique
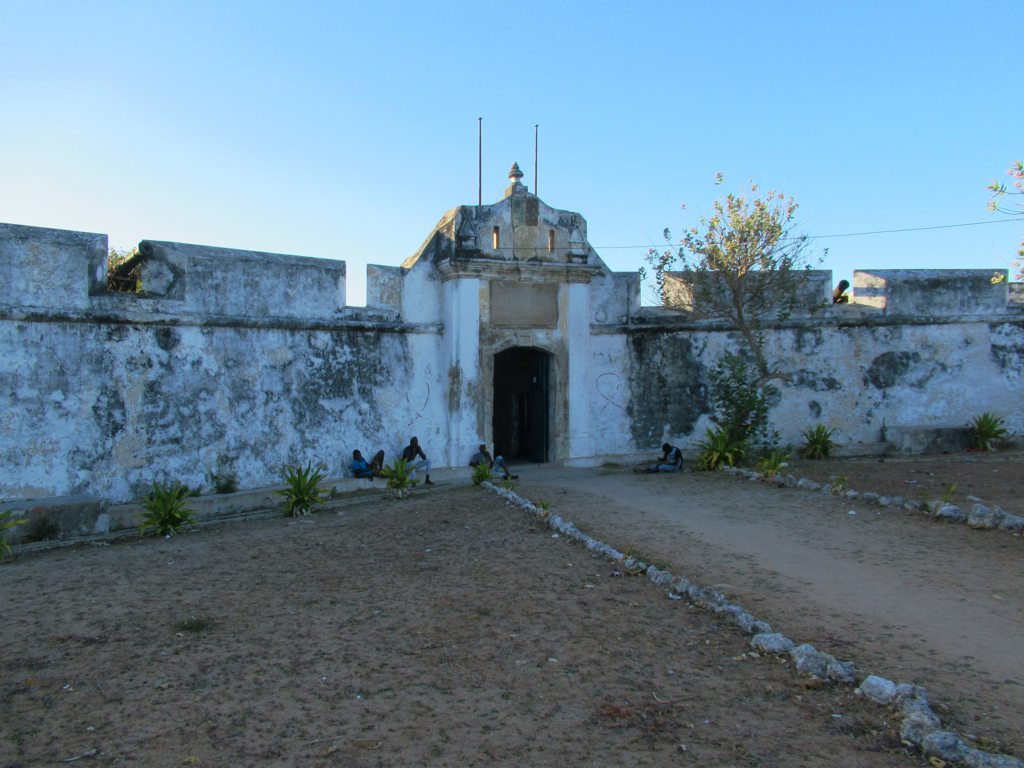
- Gate-of-arms of Fort São João Baptista

Site information
- Controlled by: Portugal; Mozambique
- Condition: Ruined

Location
- Coordinates: 12°20′19″S 40°34′55″E

Site history
- Built: 1789 and 1795
- Built by: Portuguese Empire

The Fort São João Baptista of Ibo (Fortaleza de São João Baptista do Ibo in Portuguese) is one of the forts built by the Portuguese Empire on Ibo Island, Cabo Delgado Province in Mozambique.

== History ==
Located by the sea, unusually shaped like a poligon star, the fort was designed by António José Teixeira Tigre. It was constructed between 1789 and 1795. It contains service buildings, capable of housing 300 men and was equipped with 15 artillery pieces. It helped the Portuguese on Ibo resist pirate attacks from the Sakalava of Madagascar. A chapel was added in 1795. It was classified as a historical monument in 1962. It was restored the following year.

The fort was used as a prison during the Estado Novo regime.

The fort was used to shelter families whose homes were destroyed by the hurricane Kenneth in 2019.

Due to its size, design and construction quality, it is considered the second fortress in Mozambique, after Fort São Sebastião on Mozambique Island. It is one of three forts erected on Ibo Island, alongside the smaller forts São José and Santo António.

== Gallery ==
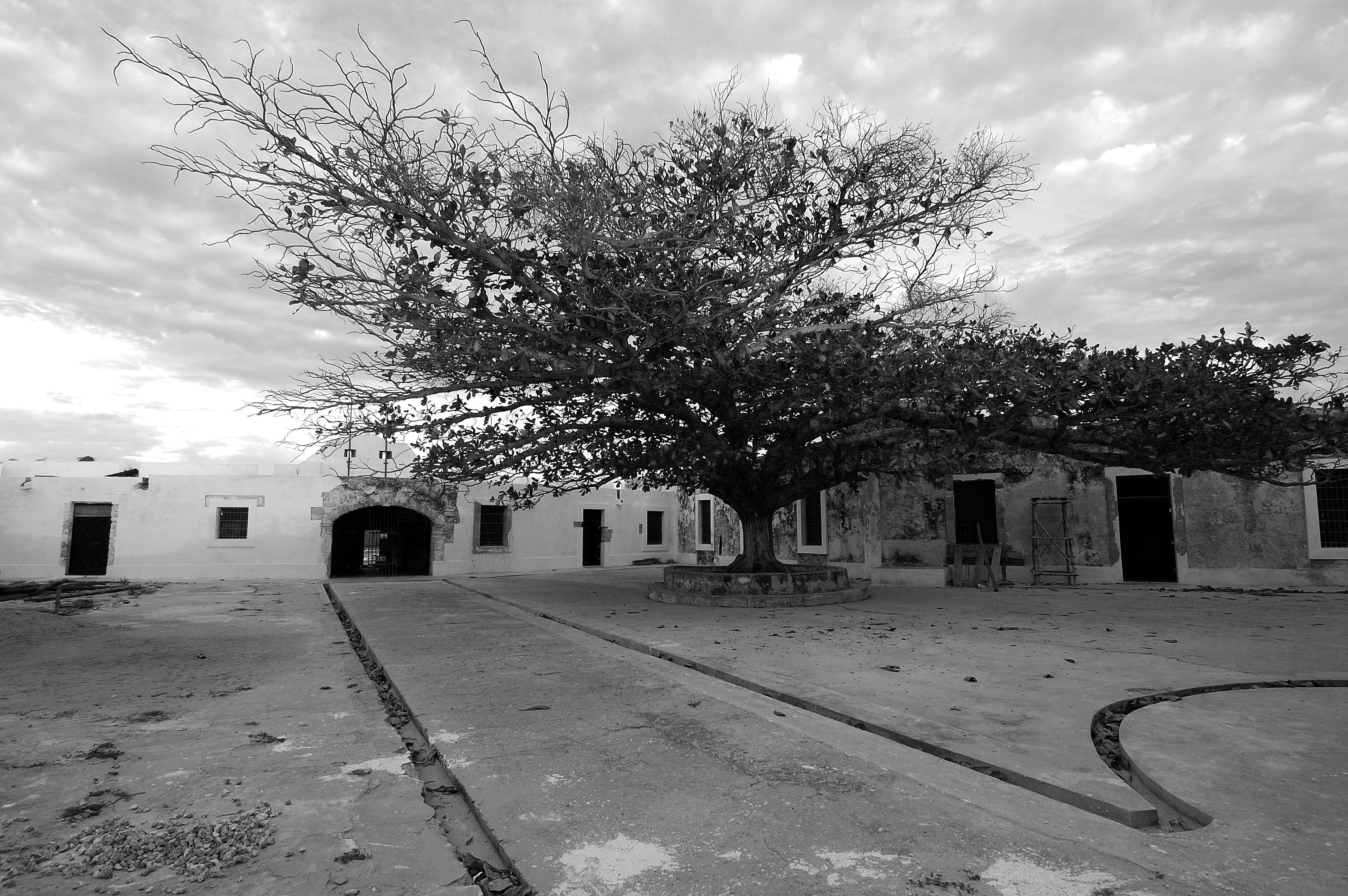
Courtyard of the fort.

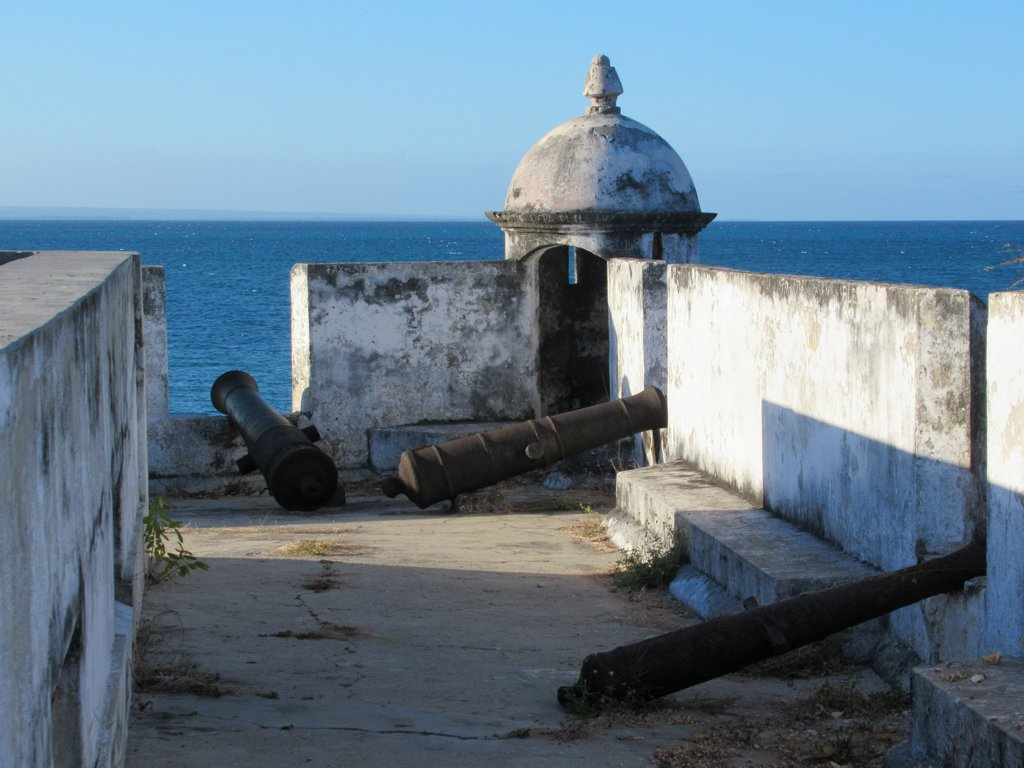
Gun emplacements.

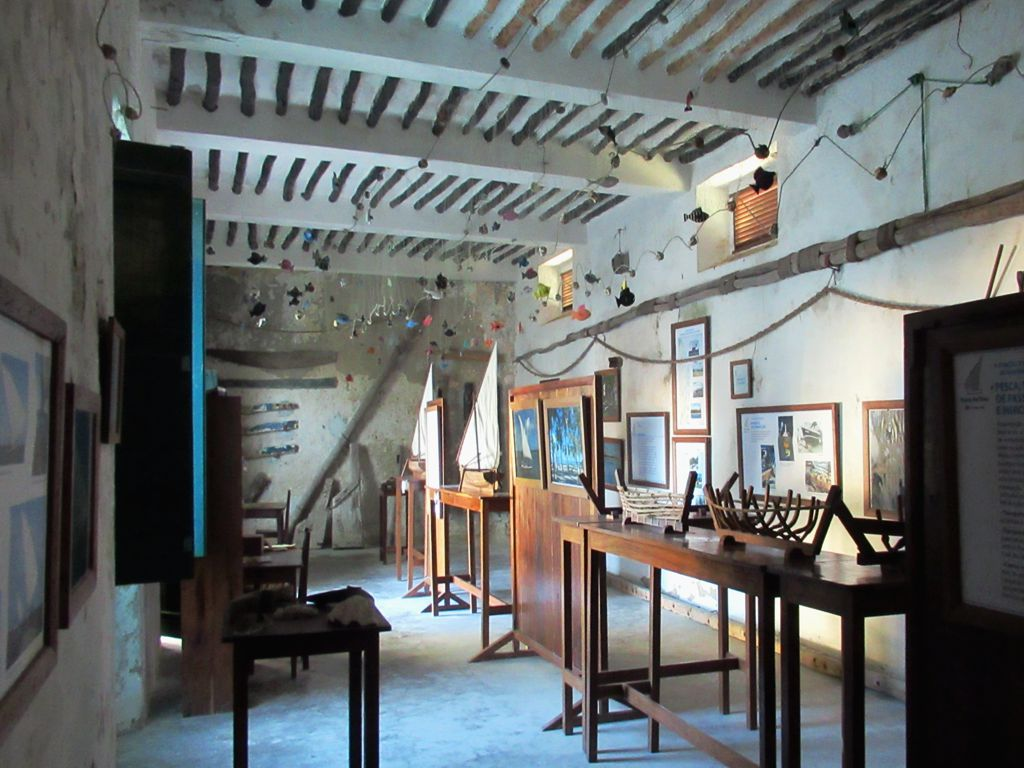
Maritime Museum, within the fort.

== See also ==
- Portuguese Mozambique
