= Quirimbas National Park =

Protected area in Mozambique

- IUCN category II (national park)
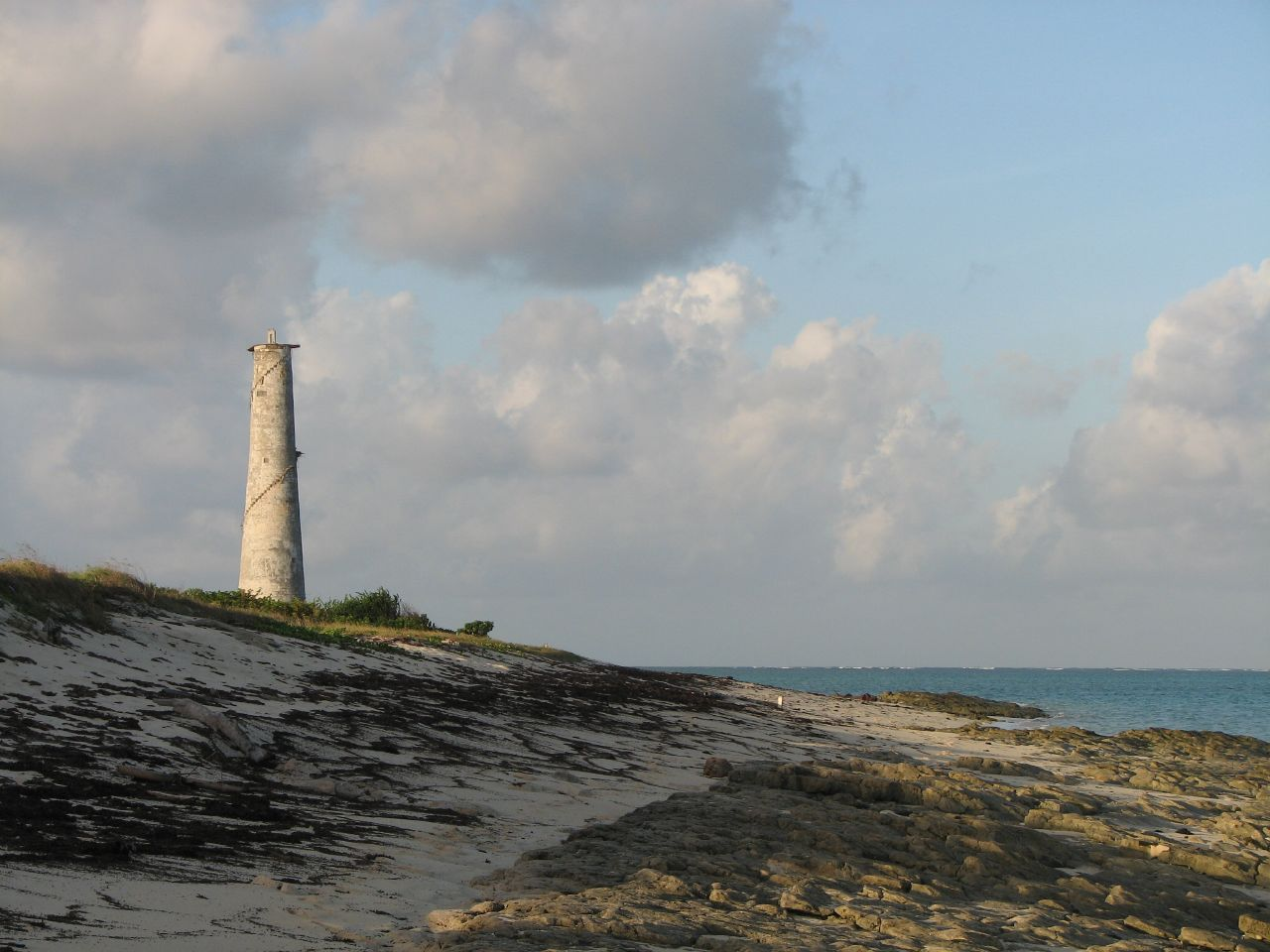
- Medjumbe Lighthouse

- Location within Mozambique
- Location: Mozambique
- Coordinates: 12°06′17″S 40°25′53″E
- Area: 1,430 km^{2} (550 sq mi)
- Established: May 25, 1971

The Quirimbas National Park (QNP)(Hifadhi ya Taifa ya Kirimba, in Swahili) is a protected area in the Cabo Delgado Province of Mozambique, encompassing the southern part of the Quirimbas Islands, as well as a significant mainland area. The mainland region of Taratibua contain various inselbergs.

== Location ==
The park was established in June 2002. It stretches for 110 kilometres (68 mi) along the northeast coast of Mozambique, and contains the southernmost 11 of the Quirimbas islands. The park has a tropical climate with a rainy season from December to April and a drier but cooler season from May to September. Daytime temperatures vary from around 25 °C (77 °F) to 35 °C (95 °F) depending on the time of year. Water temperatures are from 24 °C (75 °F) to 27 °C (81 °F). Accommodations for tourists range from basic beach-front cottages to luxurious villas.

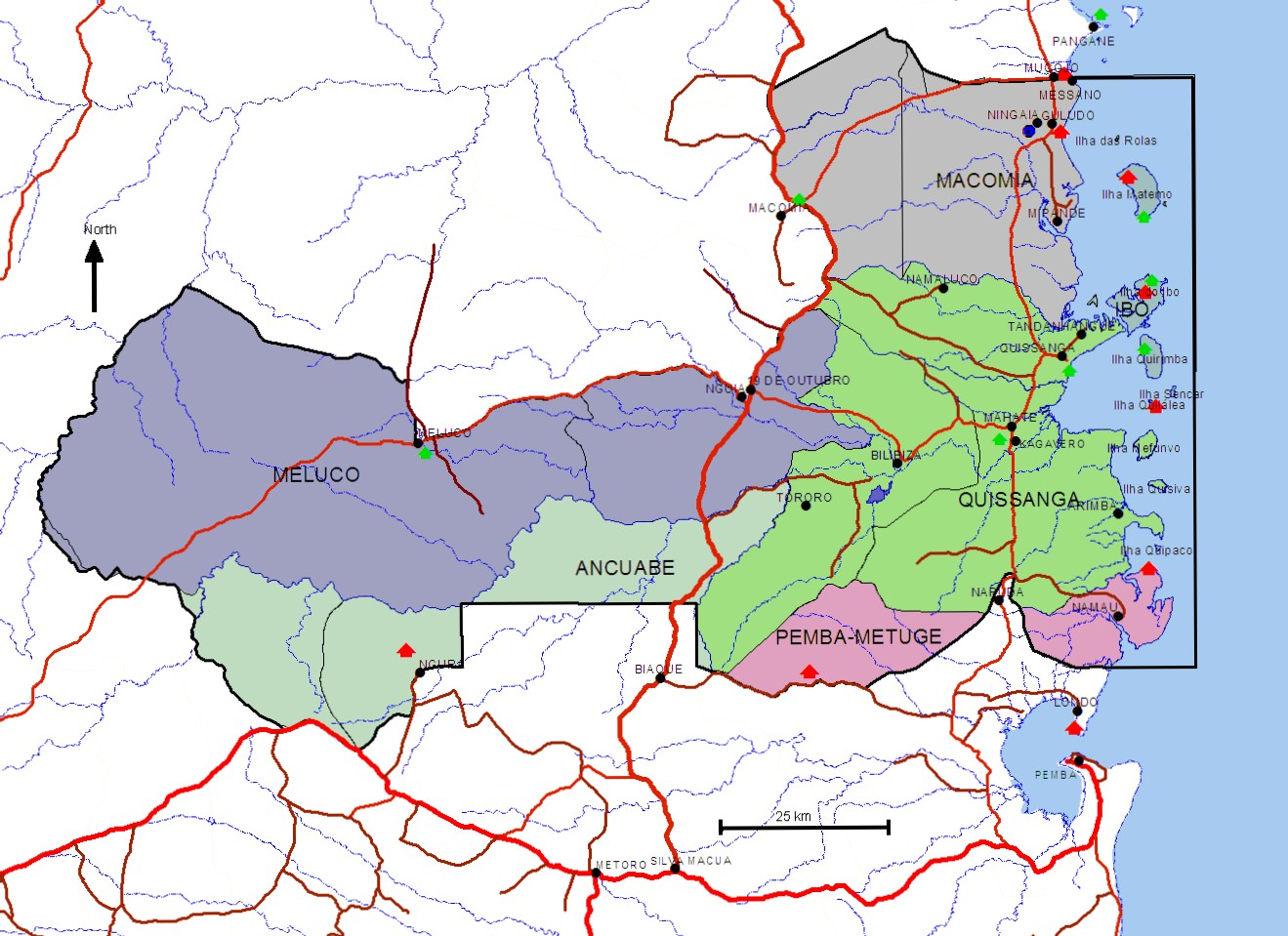

Islands include Ibo Island, Mefunvo Island, Matemo Island, Quirimba Island, Quisiva island, Quilálea Island, Sencar Island and Rolas Island.

== Ecology ==
The park protects 913,000 hectares (2,260,000 acres) of coastal forest, mangroves and coral reefs. The region was isolated for decades during the Mozambican Civil War. On land, there are sparse populations of elephants, lions, leopards, crocodiles and even wild dog. Habitats include mountains, forests, woodland, savannah, mangroves, beaches, coral reefs and sea grass beds. The park contains a rich variety of marine life including sea turtles, dolphins and many species of fish. Three hundred and seventy-five species of fish have been identified, including threatened pipefish and seahorses.

== Conservation ==
The World Wide Fund for Nature was the operator of the Park in an agreement with the Mozambican government from 2002 to 2010, and continued to provide on-the-ground technical assistance until 2016. The Park attempts to ensure that local communities, park authorities and tour operators share management responsibilities and share benefits from the park. Objectives include protection, conservation and where needed restoration of the land and marine environment, conservation of marine species and their habitat and promoting eco-friendly ways of making a living among the traditional inhabitants of the park. The project includes a fishery management program.

A 2010 WWF review found that the main problems concerned lack of money in the sanctuaries, lack of incentives for rangers, and lack of follow-up by the park management when ranger report violations. The rangers recommended increasing the number of community rangers, providing incentives or salaries for these rangers, and running more environmental education programs. On a positive note, improvements in species quantity, size and diversity were recorded.
