= Vamizi Island =

Island in Mozambique

Coordinates: 11.0177°S 40.6977°E

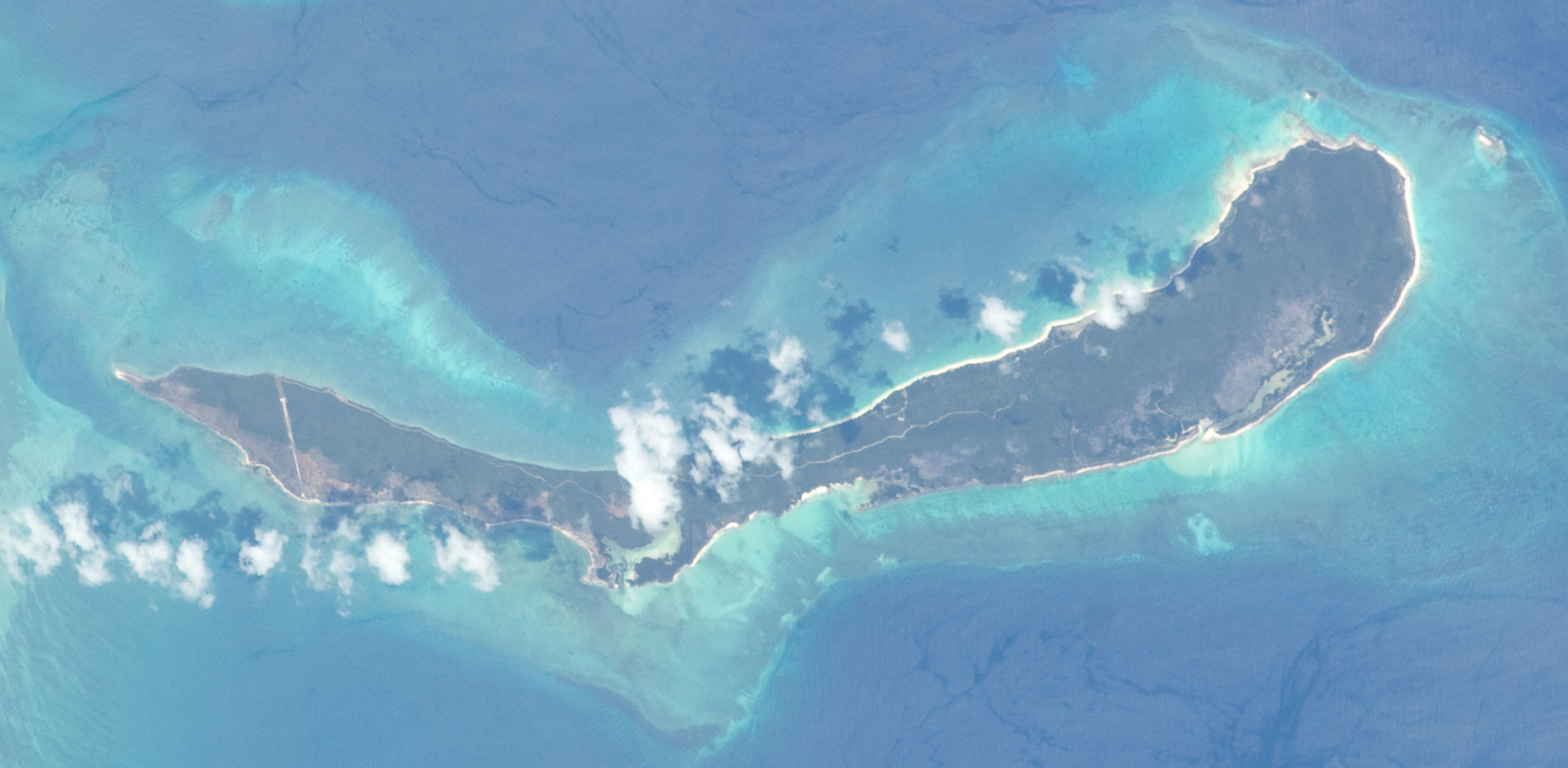
Satellite image of Vamizi island in 2011, taken during ISS Expedition 29.

Vamizi Island [vɐˈmizi] (Kisiwa cha Vamizi, in Swahili) is situated in the far north of Mozambique in the Quirimbas Archipelago. The island is recognised as one of the leading luxury private islands and conservation projects in East Africa and the Indian Ocean.

== History ==
Vamizi Island, then called Amisa, was visited by Arab sailors during the 15th century. Portuguese traders were attracted to the island by its Maluane cloth industry. Other major industries in Vamizi included the production or collection of indigo, timber, ivory, manna gum and turtle shells.

In September, 2020, Vamizi Island was captured by members of the ISIL-aligned Islamist militant group Ansar al-Sunna. All residents were evicted from the island and multiple tourist hotels were destroyed by the insurgents. The island was recaptured by Mozambican forces that same month.

== Biodiversity and conservation ==
Vamizi is home to more than 180 different species of coral and more than 400 species of reef fish. Much of the island is protected, with several conservation projects in operation. The island's turtle population, previously exploited for turtle shells, is now protected. The Friends of Vamizi Trust is a UK registered charity that manages the conservation and community projects on the island.

== Climate ==
Vamizi has a tropical climate.

== Economy ==
Historically the main economy of the island has been fishing. In the early 1990s, a group of Europeans and Mozambicans investors and philanthropists started a conservation project on the island. In 1998 they set up the Cabo Delgado Biodiversity and Tourism project in collaboration with the Zoological Society of London. In those early days, the focus was to monitor and protect the turtles and to encourage the local people to fish sustainably. In 2006 the Vamizi Island Lodge, a sixteen-room small hotel, was opened by Nelson Mandela. Subsequently, Vamizi has established itself as one of the leading luxury island resorts in east Africa attracting guests including international scientific organisations and well-known celebrities interested in the remote beauty of the island and the activities on offer including scuba diving and fishing. The island has some of the best-unspoilt coral reefs anywhere including 'Neptune's Arm' which is considered to be one of the world's top ten dive sites. In 2010 the first private villa was completed and now there are six large private villas on the island. Construction projects on the island - roads, airstrip, staff housing and the private villas have created a large number of jobs and developed skills amongst the local population.

== Sources ==
- Garnier, Julie; Silva, Isabel; Davidson, Johnston; Hill, Nicholas; Muaves, Lara; Mucaves, Santos; Guissamulo, Almeida; Shaw, Alison (2008). Obura, D.O.; Tamelander, J.; Linden, O. (eds.). Co-management of the reef at Vamizi Island, Northern Mozambique (PDF). Ten years after bleaching - facing the consequences of climate change in the Indian Ocean. CORDIO Status Report 2008. (Report). Mombasa: Coastal Oceans Research and Development in the Indian Ocean/Sida-SAREC.
- An Appreciation of the Magical Waters of Mozambique
- "Good news for coral reefs on Vamizi Island". www.huffingtonpost.com. 8 May 2017.
