= List of storms named Kenneth =

The name Kenneth has been used for five tropical cyclones in the East Pacific Ocean and one in the South-West Indian Ocean.

In the East Pacific:

- Hurricane Kenneth (1993) – powerful Category 4 hurricane that formed in the open ocean
- Hurricane Kenneth (2005) – long-lived Category 4 hurricane whose remnants brought heavy rainfall to Hawaii
- Hurricane Kenneth (2011) – late-season Category 4 hurricane that stayed at sea
- Hurricane Kenneth (2017) – a Category 4 hurricane that did not affect land
- Tropical Storm Kenneth (2023) – weak tropical storm that stayed at sea

In the South-West Indian:

- Cyclone Kenneth (2019) – Category 4 equivalent tropical cyclone that made landfall in Mozambique
