= Ibo (Mozambique) =

Island in Mozambique

Native name: Kisiwa cha Ibo
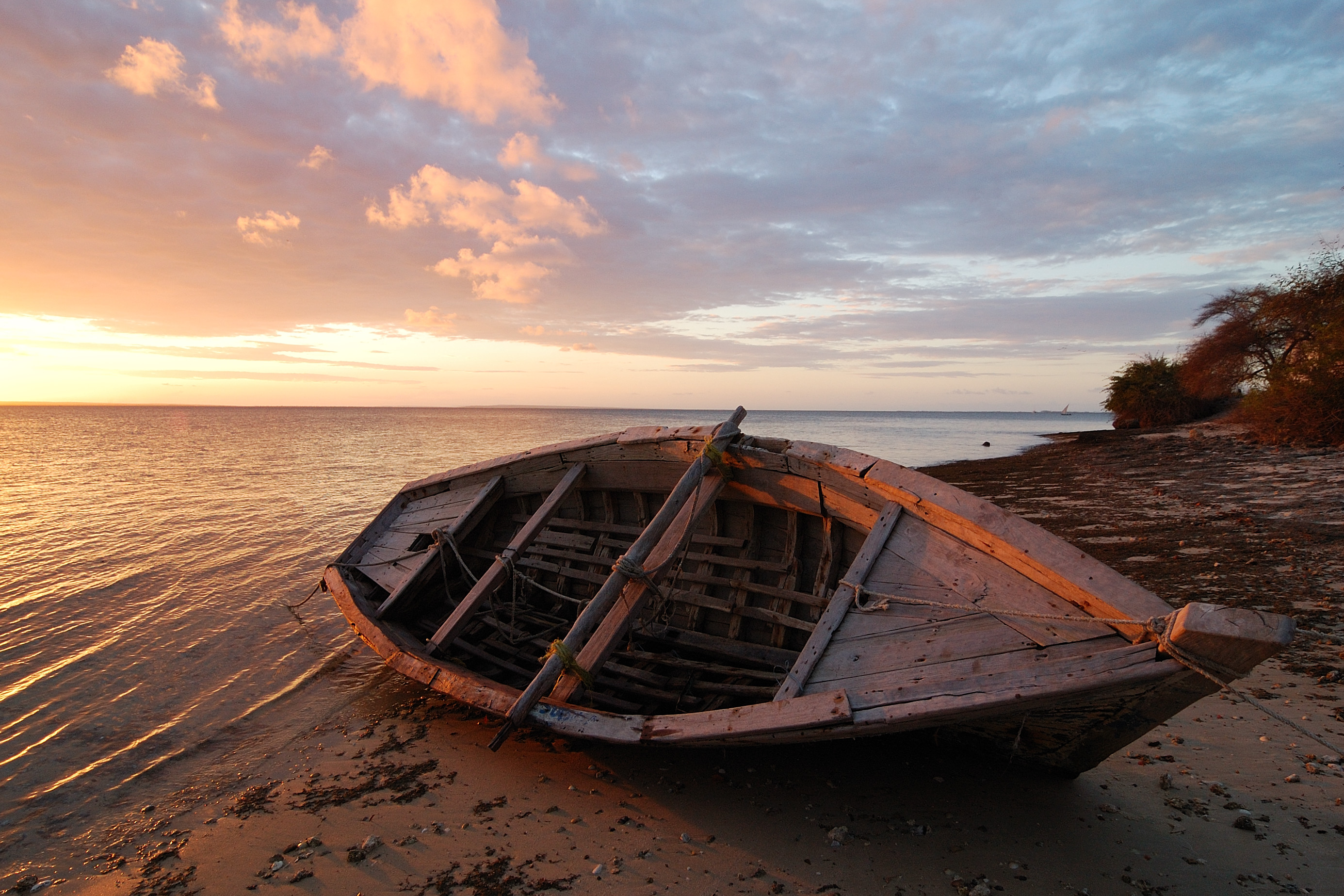
- Sunset on the beach at Ilha do Ibo

- Location within Mozambique

Geography
- Coordinates: 12°21′S 40°38′E
- Archipelago: Quirimbas Islands
- Adjacent to: Indian Ocean

Administration
- Mozambique
- Province: Cabo Delgado

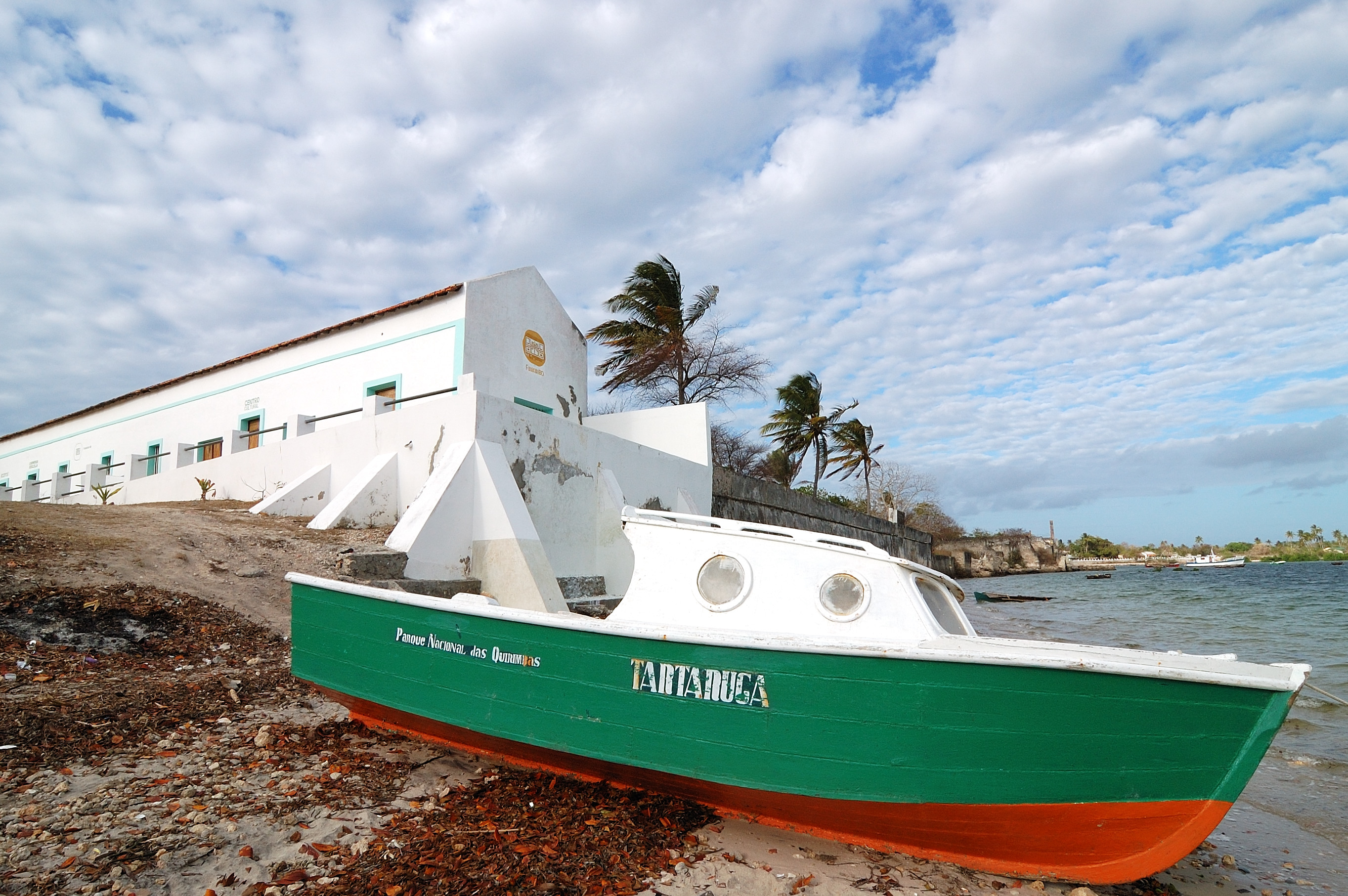
Boat at Ilha do Ibo

Ibo [ˈiβu] (Kisiwa cha Ibo, in Swahili) is one of the Quirimbas Islands in the Indian Ocean off northern Mozambique. It is part of Cabo Delgado Province. It grew as a Muslim trading port. Vasco da Gama reportedly rested on the island in 1502. The island was fortified in 1609 by the Portuguese.

In the late eighteenth century, Portuguese colonialists built the Fort of São João, which still survives, and the town, as a slave port, became the second most important in the region after Mozambique Island. The island is now a far quieter place, known for its silversmiths.

During the war of independence against Portugal, many members of FRELIMO and other nationalist organisations were imprisoned and killed at the fort. The first president of independent Mozambique stated in 1983 that "every palm tree on the island is fertilised by the bodies of the Mozambicans who were betrayed and killed by PIDE agents".

Ibo forms part of the Quirimbas National Park and is linked by dhows to the mainland at Tandanhangue.

In April 2019, Cyclone Kenneth hit the island and it was reported that 90% of the homes were destroyed.

During March 2024, Al-Shabaab jihadists reportedly seized the island after clashing with expelled forces from Quirimba island (also under control of the militants), forcing the remaining FADM members to flee towards the towns of Pemba and Quissanga. Some locals of the island denounced the government and local authorities of abandoning them.

== See also ==
- Fort São José (Ibo)
- Fort São João Baptista (Ibo)
