= Quirimbas Islands =

Island group in Mozambique off the Indian Ocean

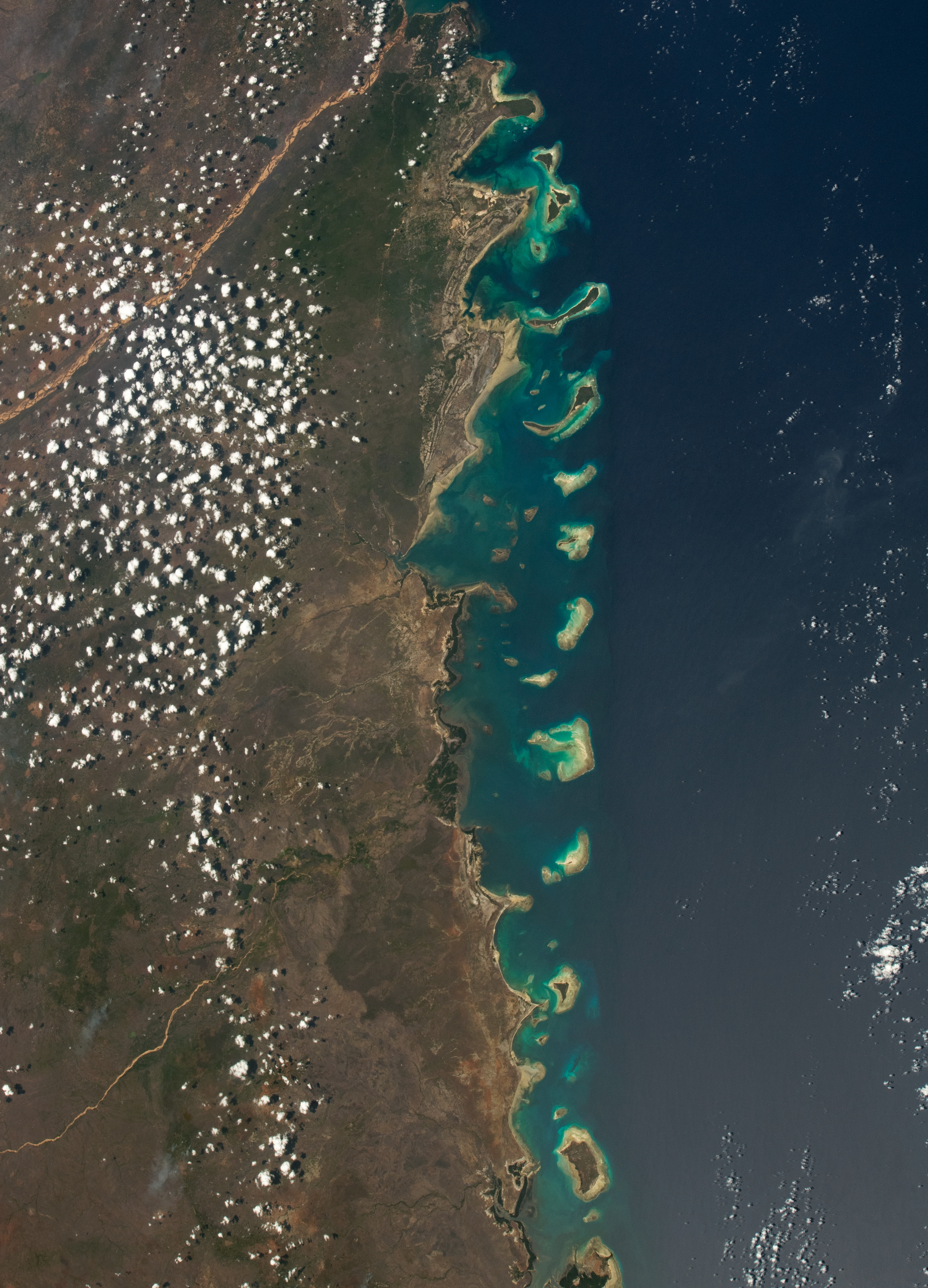
- Quirimbas Islands seen from space
- Interactive map of Quirimbas Islands

Geography
- Location: Indian Ocean
- Coordinates: 12°8′48″S 40°34′21″E
- Total islands: 32
- Major islands: Tekomaji Island; Rongui Island; Queramimbi Island; Ibo; Matemo; Medjumbe; Tambuzi Island; Quirimba; Metundo; Tavari Island; Quisiva; Vamizi Island; Rolas Island

Administration
- Mozambique

Demographics
- Population: 120,000 (2024)
- Pop. density: 16/km^{2} (41/sq mi)
- Languages: Swahili, Mwani and Portuguese
- Ethnic groups: Mwani and Swahili

The Quirimbas Islands [kiˈɾĩbɐʃ] lie in the western Indian Ocean off northeastern Mozambique in the Mozambique Channel, close to Pemba, the capital of the province of Cabo Delgado. The archipelago consists of about 32 islands, including Ibo, Matemo, Medjumbe, Quirimba, Metundo, Quisiva, Vamizi Island and Rolas Island extending north toward the border with Tanzania's Mtwara region.

== History ==
The Quirimbas Islands were originally inhabited by Makonde fishing communities. From the medieval period, Swahili trading settlements developed across the archipelago. Their prominence declined in the 16th century as Portuguese maritime routes expanded; during this period the islands were referred to as the Ilhas de São Lázaro (“Islands of Saint Lazarus”).

After the Portuguese established coastal bases, including at Ibo Island, many Swahili merchants relocated elsewhere within the archipelago to continue trading independently. Conflict followed, during which Portuguese forces killed an estimated sixty Muslim merchants and destroyed property.

The islands remained under Portuguese rule until Mozambique gained independence in 1975. Prior to independence, only four of the archipelago’s approximately 32 islands were permanently inhabited; settlement has since expanded.

On 23 May 2014, a mud spill was reported offshore near the Quirimbas Islands from a drilling operation run by Anadarko Petroleum.

These islands are now well known for their diving sites, some up to 400 metres (1,300 ft) deep. The Quirimbas National Park, spanning an area of 7,500 square kilometres (2,900 sq mi), includes the 11 most southerly islands, which are partly surrounded by mangroves. The park was established in 2002 as a protected area.

In the early morning of 3 March 2024, militants of the Islamic State – Central Africa Province seized the island of Quirimba after clashing with local forces, killing and wounding a number of them, while forcing the remnants to flee to the nearby island of Ibo and elsewhere. Two days later, local sources reported a major attack launched by the same militants against the neighboring island of Ibo, successfully seizing it after fierce clashes; locals of the island accused the government and the municipal authorities of having abandoned them after the attacks.

== World Heritage Status ==
The Quirimbas Islands are currently on the tentative list for becoming a UNESCO World Heritage Site which was submitted in 2008.

== Gallery ==
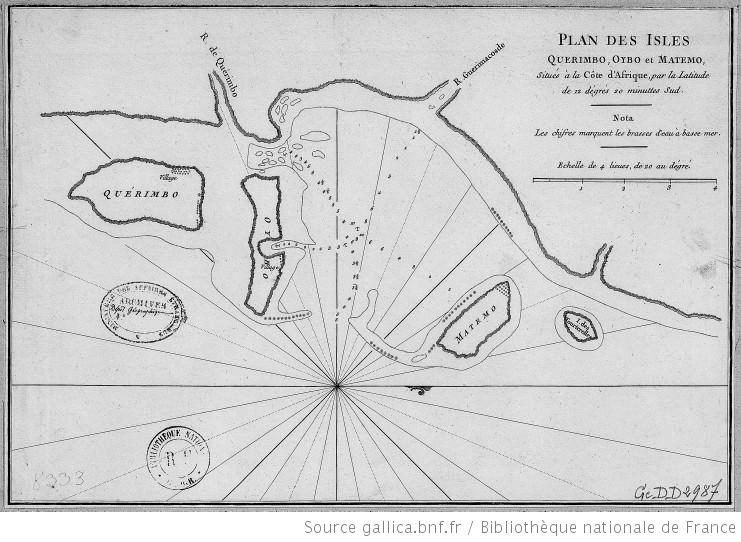
A map of the island in 1775

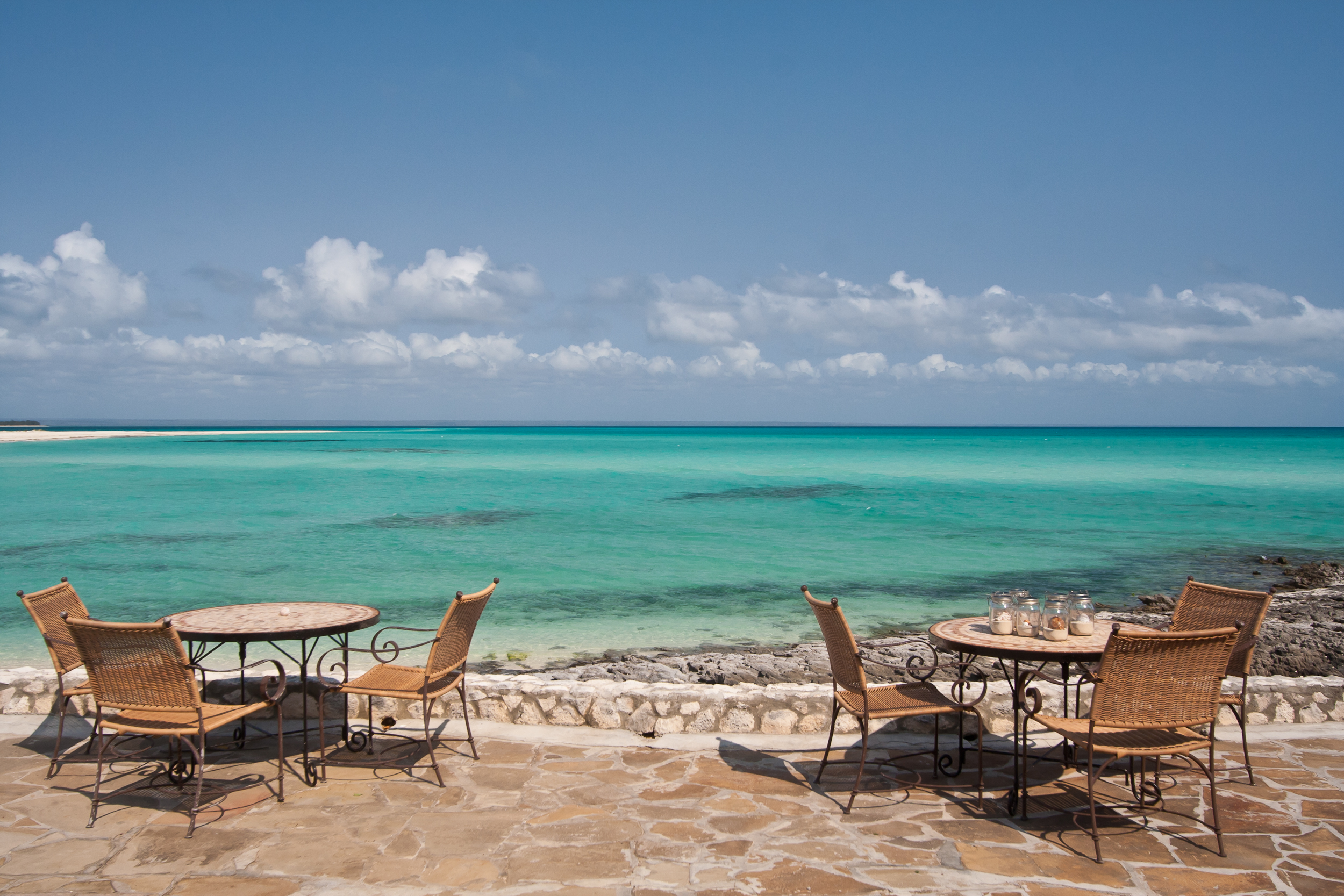
The coast of Medjumbe Island

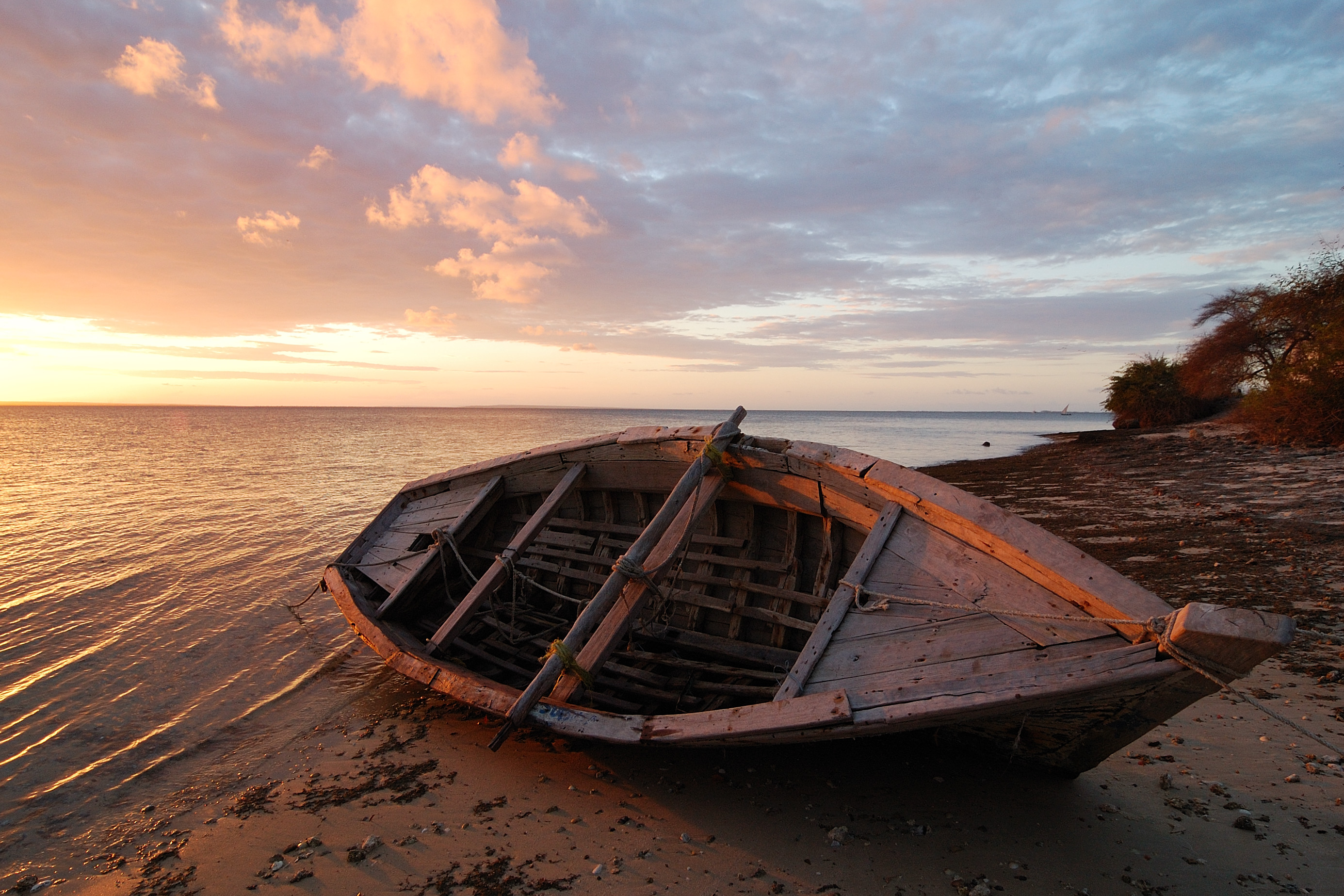
Beach of Ibo Island

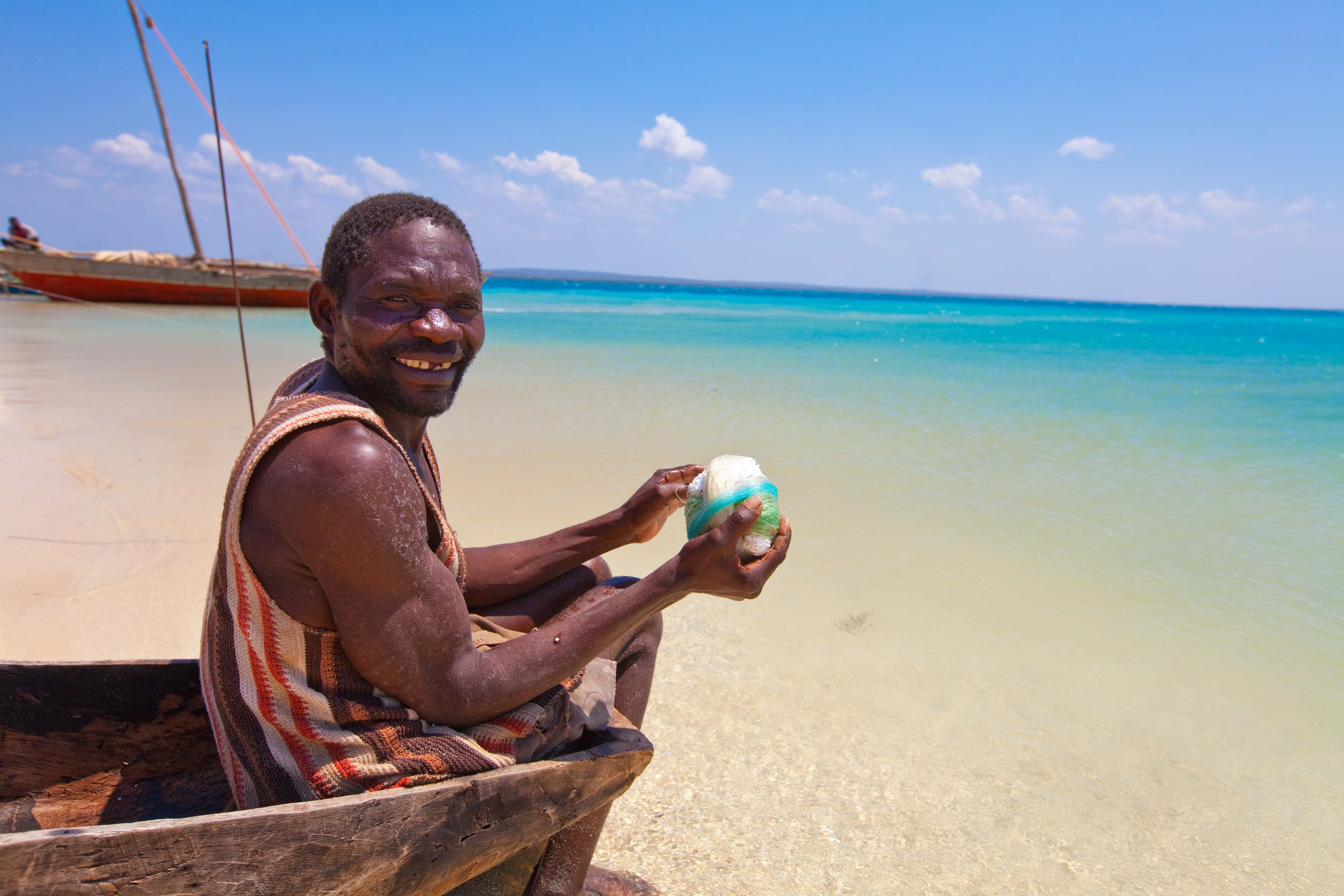
Local fisherman on dhow safari
